= Royal Australian Corps of Transport =

Administrative corps of the Australian Army

- Badge
- Active: 1 June 1973–present
- Country: Australia
- Branch: Army
- Type: Corps
- Role: Transportation, military supply chain management, military logistics
- Motto: Par Oneri (Equal to the Task)
- Colours: Blue, white and scarlet
- March: Wait for the Wagon Wait for the Wagon as a military tune Excerpt of the 'Wait for the Wagon' tune as played by the HM Coldstream Guards Band

Commanders
- Head of Corps: Brigadier Colin Bassett
- Colonel-in-Chief: Anne, Princess Royal

Insignia
- Abbreviation: RACT
- RACT Flag

The Royal Australian Corps of Transport (RACT) is an administrative corps within the Australian Army. The RACT is ranked tenth in seniority of the corps of the Australian Army, and is the most senior logistics corps. It was formed on 1 June 1973 as an amalgamation of the Royal Australian Army Service Corps (RAASC) and Royal Australian Engineers Transportation Service. The RACT is responsible for the operation of army surface transport assets, movement control, terminal and postal services, and Army aspects of air logistic support.

== Role ==
The role of the Royal Australian Corps of Transport is to control and operate Army-owned surface transport, other than unit transport, and to provide movement control, terminal, postal and Army aspects of air logistic support. Members of the corps are employed in a variety of roles: road transport, movements, air dispatch, postal, water transport, and terminal operations.

== History ==
The RACT was formed on 1 June 1973 from an amalgamation of two existing corps: Royal Australian Army Service Corps (RAASC) and Royal Australian Engineers Transportation Service (RAE-TN). From RAASC, RACT gained the responsibilities of road and amphibian transport, air dispatch and postal functions, while from RAE-TN it gained its water transport, terminal and movements roles. The remaining RAASC functions—such as the provision of foodstuffs and petrol, oils and lubricants—were allocated to the Royal Australian Army Ordnance Corps (RAAOC), and RAASC ceased to exist on 31 May 1973. The corps also draws its origins from the Australian Army Transportation Corps, which existed between 1945 and 1947.

=== Early beginnings ===
Prior to the Federation of Australia in 1901, each Australian state maintained its own military forces. Victoria was the first to raise a logistic unit, which was known as the 'Ordnance, Commissariat and Transport Corps' in 1887; later renamed the Commissariat and Transport Corps. A similar unit known as the Army Service Corps was founded in New South Wales, and upon the formation of the national army in 1901, the predecessor to RACT, the Australian Army Service Corps (AASC) was formed.

By 1905, transport-specific units were raised within the AASC for the provision of land transport, including the No. 1 Light Horse Supply Column in New South Wales, and No. 2 Infantry Supply Column in Victoria.

=== Australian Army Transportation Corps (AATnC) and RAE(Tn) ===
Sometime in 1940, the Directorate of Rail Transportation was formed to coordinate movements between Australian rail networks and roads.

In early 1942, a joint services decision was made to make the Army responsible for the supply and operation of small water craft and dock services, thus the Directorate of Water Transportation (Small Craft) RAE, was formed. This decision was made due to Navy being less able to command and control personnel that were widely dispersed where land forces were operating, particularly in New Guinea.

On 6 August 1945, the Australian Army Transportation Corps (AATnC) was formed by the amalgamation of these directorates, along with Road transport, and all their associated operating units. However, on 7 April 1947, road transport was separated back into the AASC, and the remaining amalgamation become known as the Transportation Service RAE, or RAE(Tn). The RAE(Tn) latter expanded to include the operation of all military terminals.

The railway elements were maintained through an Army Reserve Unit until the late 1960s.

The RAE(Tn) was combined again with Road transport from the AASC in the formation of the RACT on 1 June 1973.

=== Service history during WWII ===
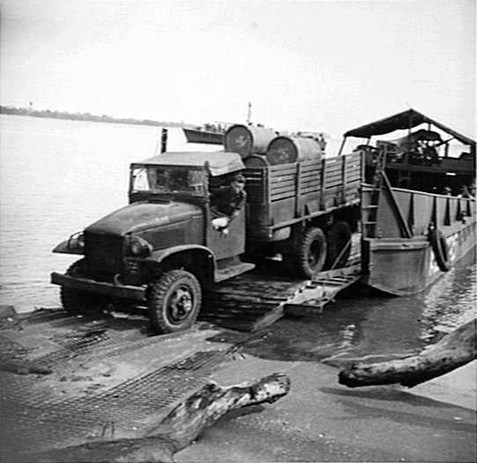
AASC Troops near Wewak, New Guinea during WWII using Australian landing craft to transport forward trucks loaded with stores.

=== Transport as a part of the AASC 1947–1973 ===
Road Transport was a part of the Australian Army Service Corps between 1901–1945 and 1947–1973.

== Corps embellishments ==
=== Banners ===
RACT Princess Royal Banner 2013

At Puckapunyal on 4 June 1983 the RACT was presented with its former Princess Alice banner. It was received from the Governor General of Australia, Sir Ninian Stephen, who presented it on behalf of Princess Alice.

Following the death of Princess Alice in 2004, Anne, The Princess Royal, was announced as the next Colonel-in-Chief of the Royal Australian Corps of Transport on the 17 March 2011 at the 2011 RACT Corps Conference. On 1 June 2013, at Amberley, the RACT was presented with its new Princess Royal Banner. It is red with gold embroidery of the Princess Royal cypher, RACT badge and year 2013. The reverse side has the Commonwealth Coat of Arms.

The RACT Banner is currently housed in the Tobruk Barracks Officers' Mess at Puckapunyal.

=== Lanyard and Corps colours ===
The RACT Lanyard is a braided blue and red lanyard to represent its RAASC and RAE heritage. Notably, RACT was the first corps in the Australian Army to receive approval to wear a braided lanyard.

The corps colours of the RACT are blue, white and scarlet. Each of the colours represents various aspects of the history of the corps:

- Blue: representing the early uniforms worn by the corps predecessors
- White: represents the white facings of the Military Train and also denotes the corps mounted background
- Scarlet: represents the amalgamation of the RAE Transportation Service.

=== Badge ===
The badge of the RACT consists of the seven-pointed Federation Star incorporating the Royal Cipher, being common to both the badges of the Royal Australian Engineers (RAE) and Royal Australian Army Service Corps (RAASC). Surrounding the Royal Cipher is a circlet containing the name 'Royal Australian Corps of Transport', which is enclosed by a laurel wreath and the Corps motto Par Oneri which translates to 'Equal to the Task'.

== Units and locations ==
The Royal Australian Corps of Transport has a significant presence at both Puckapunyal, Victoria where the main elements of the Army School of Transport (AST) operates alongside two transport squadrons; and at the Army Logistic Training Centre (ALTC), Bandiana and Bonegilla, Victoria which also has elements of the Army School of Transport. RACT soldiers and officers are employed all throughout Australia and overseas.

Transport units in the Australian army are incorporated in Combat Service Support Battalions (CSSB) or Force Support Battalions (FSB) units apart from the 17th Sustainment Brigade. RACT personnel however, are broadly employed, particularly as driver specialists, within non-Transport units, such as infantry battalions, engineering regiments, health companies and other logistics units and sub-units as well as within Special Operations Command units.

=== Air Dispatch ===
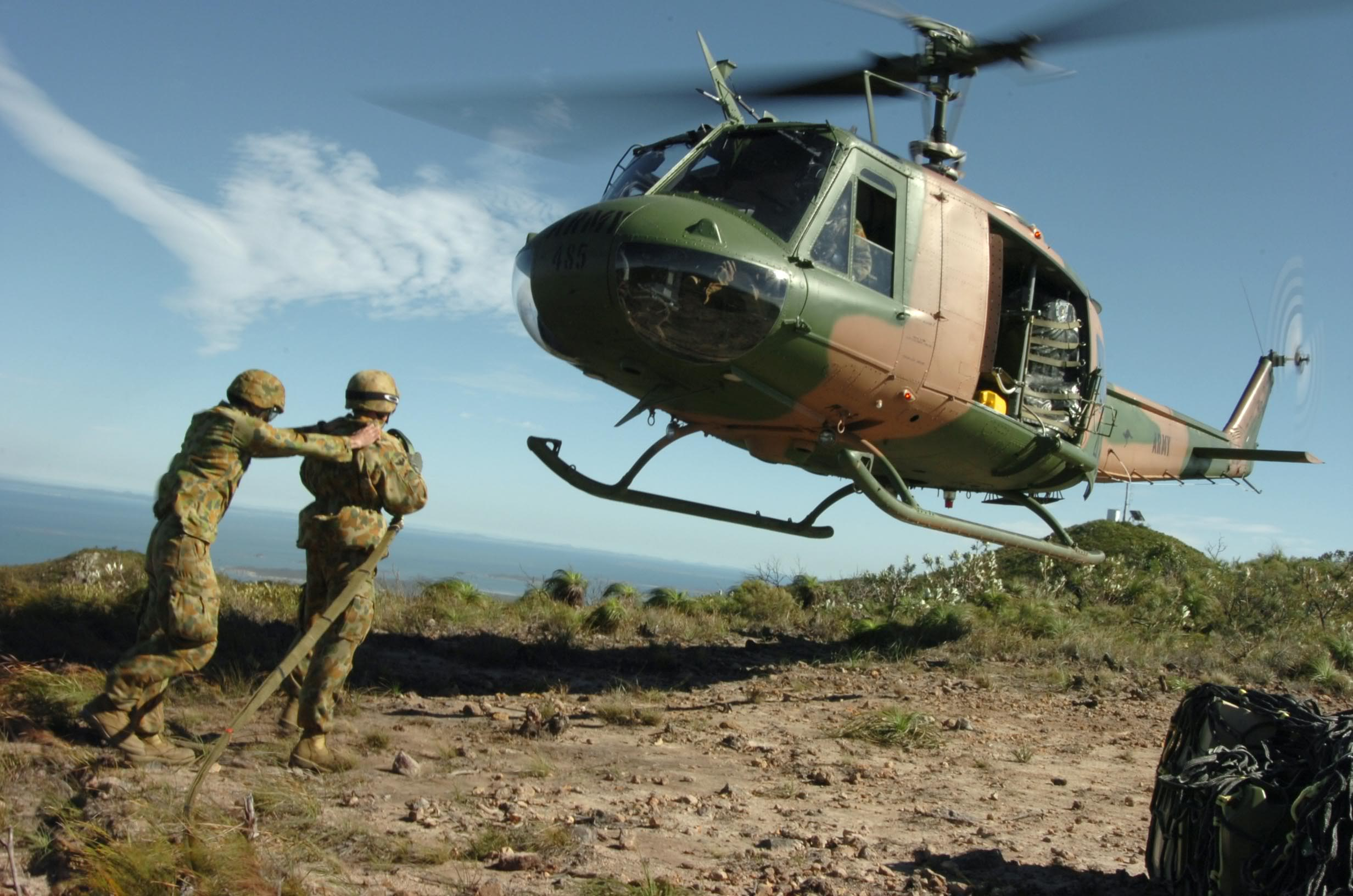
Members of the 176th Air Dispatch Squadron attach supplies for transport to a UH-1 Huey during Exercise Talisman Saber 2005

Army Air Dispatch is provided by a combined Regular and Reserve Army 176th Air Dispatch Squadron based at RAAF Base Richmond, New South Wales, Australia, the squadron is a sub-unit of the 9th Force Support Battalion (9 FSB). Air Dispatch uses the motto Par Oneri de Caelo, meaning Equal to the Task from the Sky.

=== Cargo and Terminal ===
The 30 Terminal Squadron, located in Townsville, Queensland operates as a part of 10th Force Support Battalion (10 FSB) of the 17th Sustainment Brigade (previously known as the 17th Combat Service Support Brigade) primarily provides the army capability for the movement of cargo by air, land and sea. Cargo and Terminal operations work closely with the Australian Navy and Ships' Army Establishment (previously known as Ships' Army Detachments) in loading and unloading of cargo and equipment. The Ships Army Establishment are currently only employed onboard HMAS Canberra, HMAS Adelaide and HMAS Choules.

=== Movements ===
RACT personnel are responsible for planning, coordinating, executing, controlling and monitoring the operational and strategic movements of personnel and equipment of the ADF, and contribute to ADF movements in a joint forces environment. Movements are coordinated through 1st Joint Movement Group and Joint Movement Control Offices (JMCOs) located in most capital cities across Australia as well as all locations where there are significant army units.

=== Postal ===
During the First World War, Australia had a dedicated Australian Army Postal Corps. However, since formation of the RACT, the responsibility of Postal Services for the ADF falls primarily to a small number of RACT personnel operating at Lavarack Barracks in Queensland and is loosely linked to the Australia Post delivery network. The military staff are responsible to operate Australian Forces Post Offices (AFPO) and are typically dynamic and exist in locations where Australian forces are operating overseas or on major exercises.

=== Road Transport ===
Road Transport is the largest capability group of the RACT.

The regular army road transport units are:

- 1st Transport Squadron (1 CSSB), located in Darwin, Northern Territory. Primary operations include Heavy Road Transport, including Oversize/Overmass Transport and Road Train Operations
- 2nd Transport Squadron (7 CSSB), disbanded, located in Brisbane, Queensland
- 5th Transport Squadron (7 CSSB), located in Brisbane, Queensland. Primary operations include Heavy Road Transport, including Oversize/Overmass Transport.
- 9th Transport Squadron (3 CSSB), located in Townsville, Queensland. Primary operations include Heavy Road Transport, including Oversize/Overmass Transport and Road Train Operations.
- 26th Transport Squadron (9 FSB), located in Amberley, Queensland. Primary operations include Heavy Road Transport, including Oversize/Overmass Transport and Road Train Operations.

The army reserve road transport units are regional, and generally operate from multiple depots:

- 3rd Transport Squadron (5 CSSB), located in Southern NSW & ACT
- 4th Transport Squadron (11 CSSB), located in various locations in Qld and NSW
- 8th Transport Squadron (9 CSSB), located in South Australia
- 10th Transport Squadron (13 CSSB), located in Western Australia
- 7th Transport Squadron (4 CSSB), located in Victoria
- 15th Transport Squadron (2 FSB), located in Victoria
- 16th Transport Squadron (8 CSSB), located in Newcastle NSW
- 44th Transport Squadron (2 FSB), located in Tasmania

The Army School of Transport is split into three main units:

- Army School of Transport - Puckapunyal, provides driver training for initial entry into Army for drivers, as well as skill upgrade training for Promotion Courses and Heavy Road Movement Training
- Army School of Transport - Land 121 Training Wing - Headquarters in Amberley QLD, with training teams located in Brisbane, Townsville and Darwin, provides up-skilling and conversion courses from Legacy equipment, as well as operator training on new-to-service equipment
- Maritime Wing, Army Logistic Training Centre, Townsville, QLD - Provides training for Marine Specialists and Cargo Specialists

=== Water Transport ===
Army Water Transport involves the operation of amphibious watercraft, such as the LARC-V for transport across sea, inland water and ship to shore operations (also known as Logistics over-the-shore operations). The 35 Water Transport Squadron part of the 10th Force Support Battalion (10 FSB) located in Townsville, Queensland as a part of the 17th Sustainment Brigade primarily provides this capability for the Australian Army.

== Employment categories ==
The Royal Australian Corps of Transport is responsible for providing a vast range of capabilities, through several different employment categories which are available to both Australian Regular Army and Australian Army Reserve (part-time service):

- Air Dispatchers
- Cargo Specialists (full-time service only)
- Driver Specialists (split into three categories)
  - Driver Specialist - Entry level driver with qualifications for the 40M and HX77 or the Mercedes-Benz G-Class
  - Operator, Heavy Vehicles - Operation of vehicles, including a trailer exceeding 9,000 kg ATM towed behind the HX77
  - Operator, Specialist Vehicles - Operation of Semi-Trucks including the HX81 Heavy Transporter in either Semi-Trailer, Float/Lowboy, and Road Train configurations.
- Marine Specialists (full-time service only)
- Operator Movements

RACT soldiers may also be posted to Australian Army Postal service.

== Vehicles and equipment ==
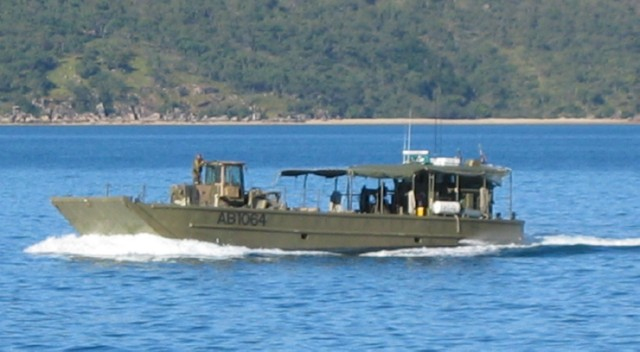
An Australian Army LCM-8

Australian resupply convoy in Afghanistan in 2010

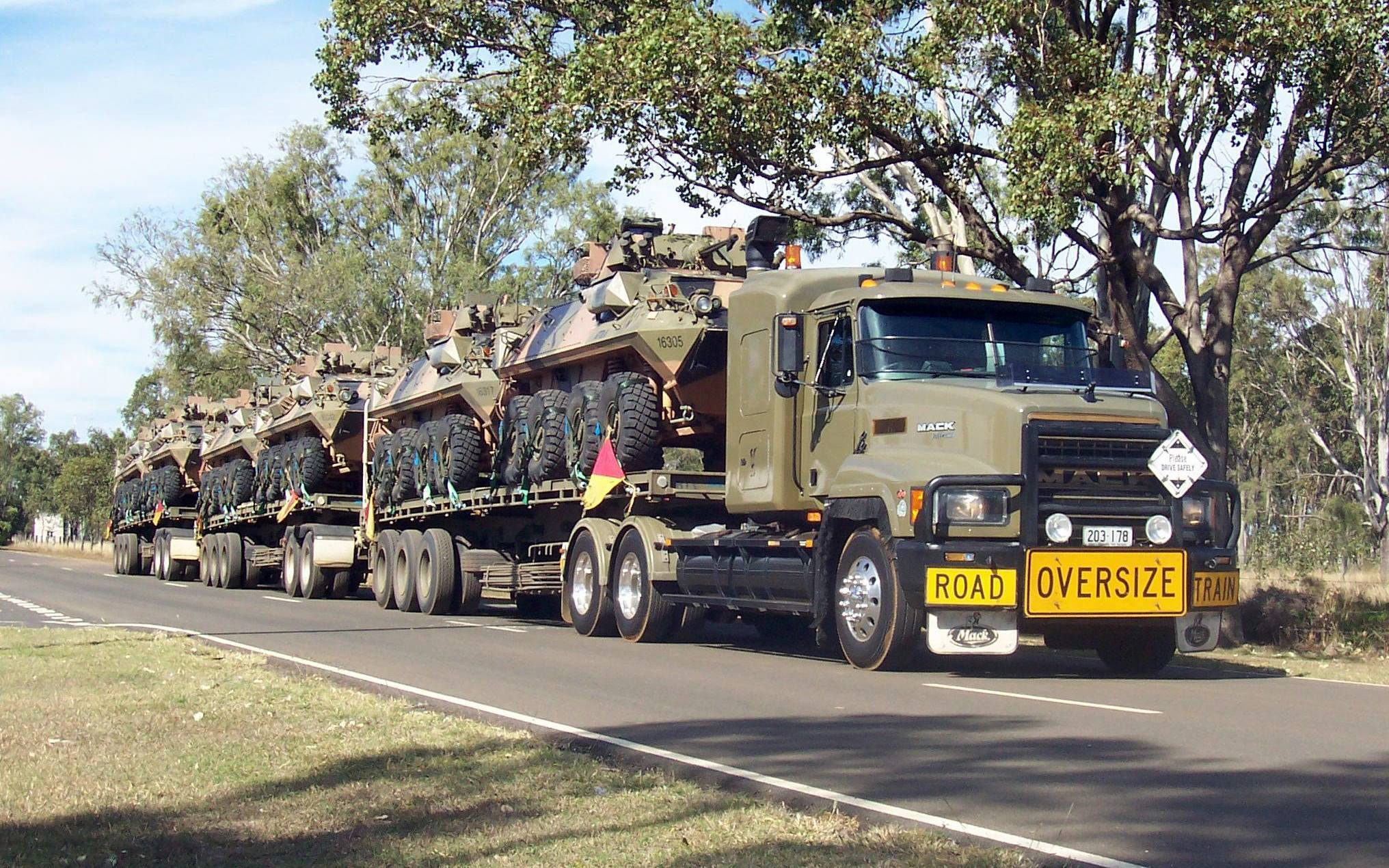
RACT Mack truck as a triple road-train carrying 6 ASLAVs

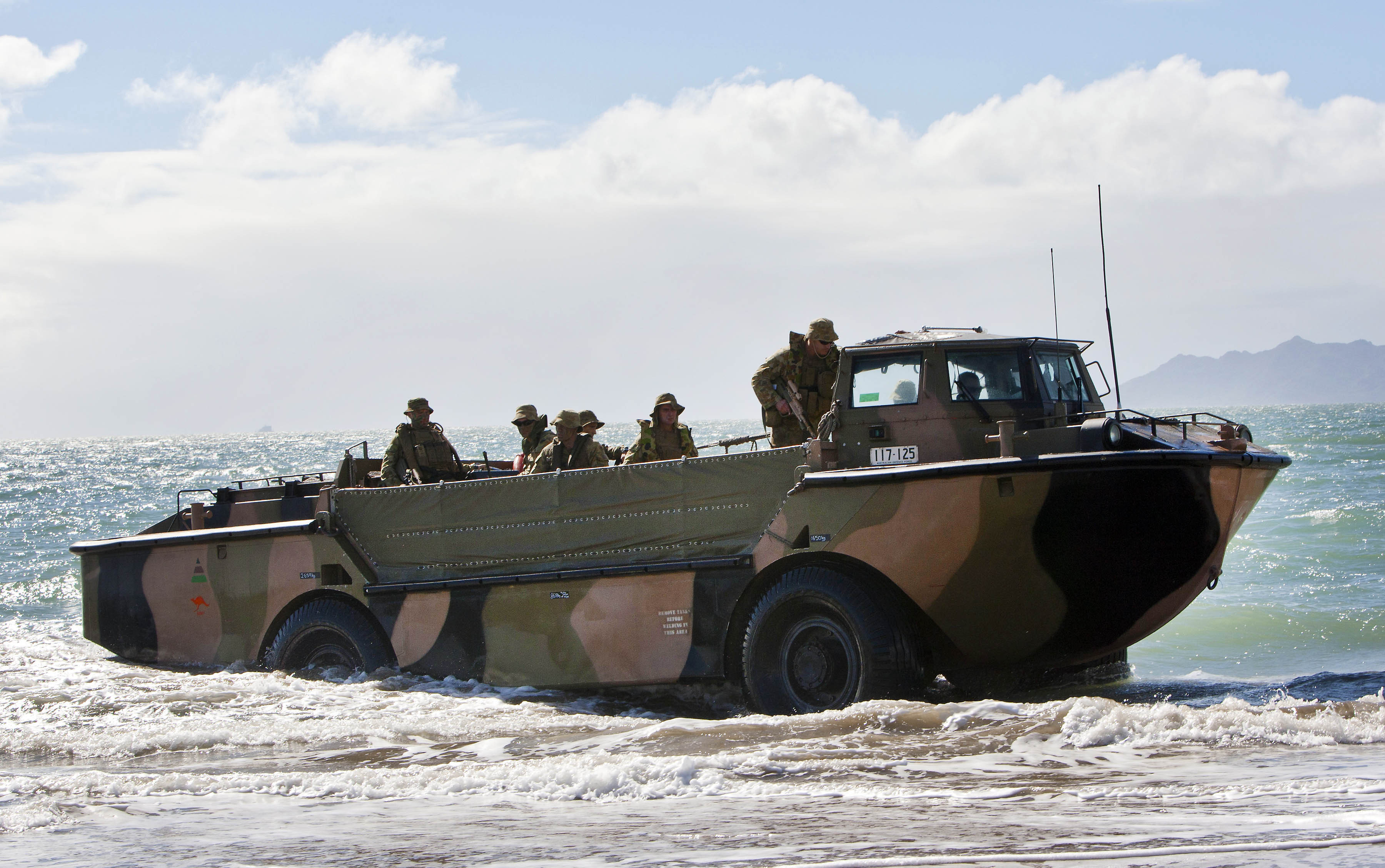
Amphibious landing using an Australian Army LARC-V (2013)

The Australian Defence Force is currently undergoing a significant vehicle modernisation project, known as LAND 121. LAND 121 is a multi-phase project that aims to deliver more advanced capability that includes hardened and networked vehicles through the inclusion of IED-resistant light armouring combined with advanced GPS Enhanced Position Location Reporting Systems and integrated radio communications. The new vehicles are a significant increase in capability, replacing vehicle fleets that have been in-service since the 1980s.

LAND 121 is scheduled to deliver around 7500 protected and unprotected vehicles providing battlefield mobility and logistics support.

Old Fleet vehicles & equipment (In-service, being retired)

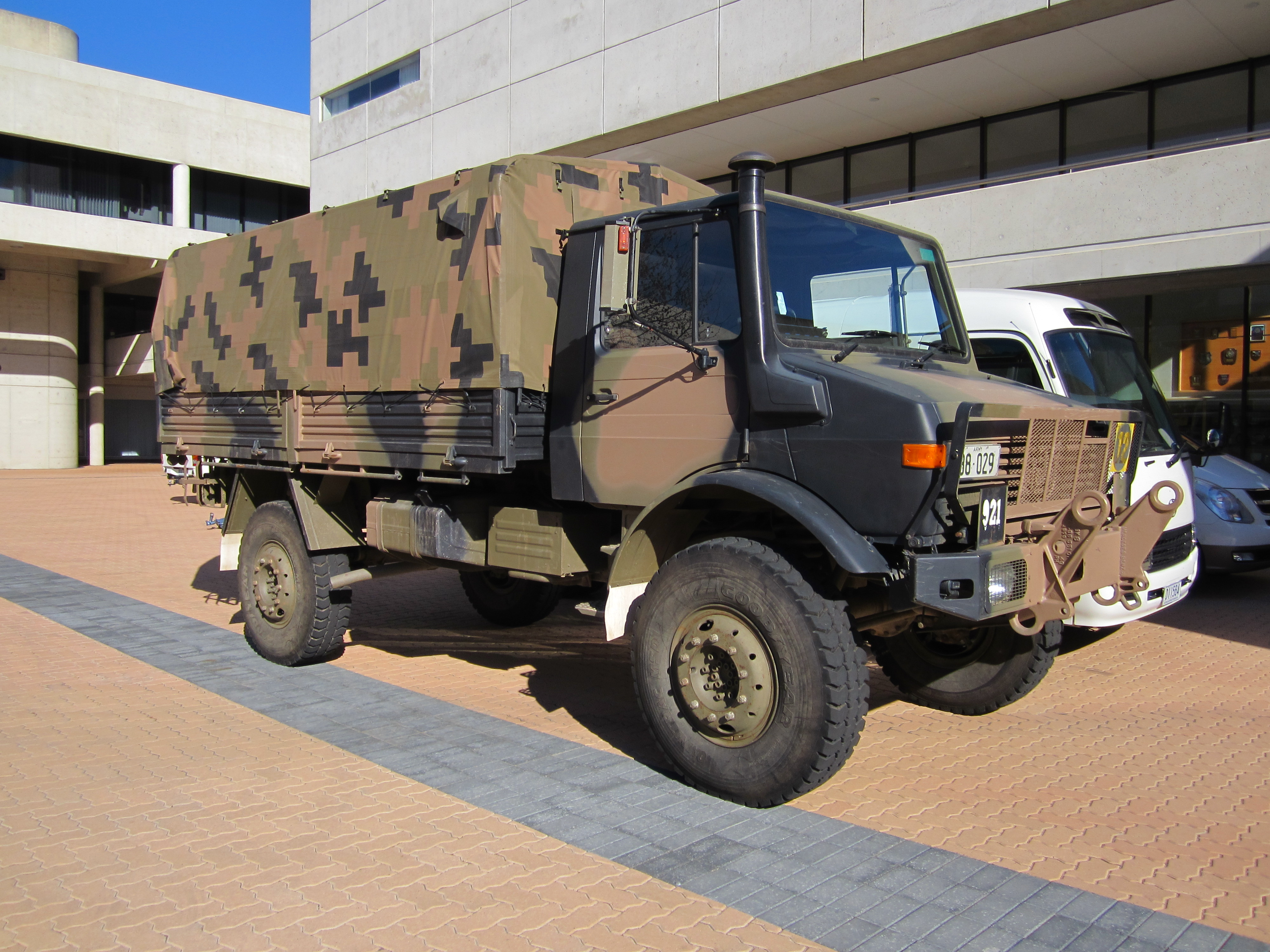
Australian Army Unimog Truck

- Land Rover 110 4x4
- Land Rover 110 6x6
- Mercedes-Benz Unimog (including Cargo, Dump, and others)
- Trailers (various)
- Mack R series/Mack MC3 (including Cargo, Dump, Truck Tanker Fuel, Truck Tanker Water and others)
- Mack Fleetliner MC2
- International S Line Prime Mover

In-service vehicles & equipment

- Camouflaged Yamaha XT 600 and Honda motorcycles (SOCOMD only)
- Quadbike ATV (SOCOMD only)
- Various 'white-fleet' vehicles
- Tricon, 20 ft and ISO containers
- Kalmar RT-240 Rough Terrain Container Handler (RTCH)

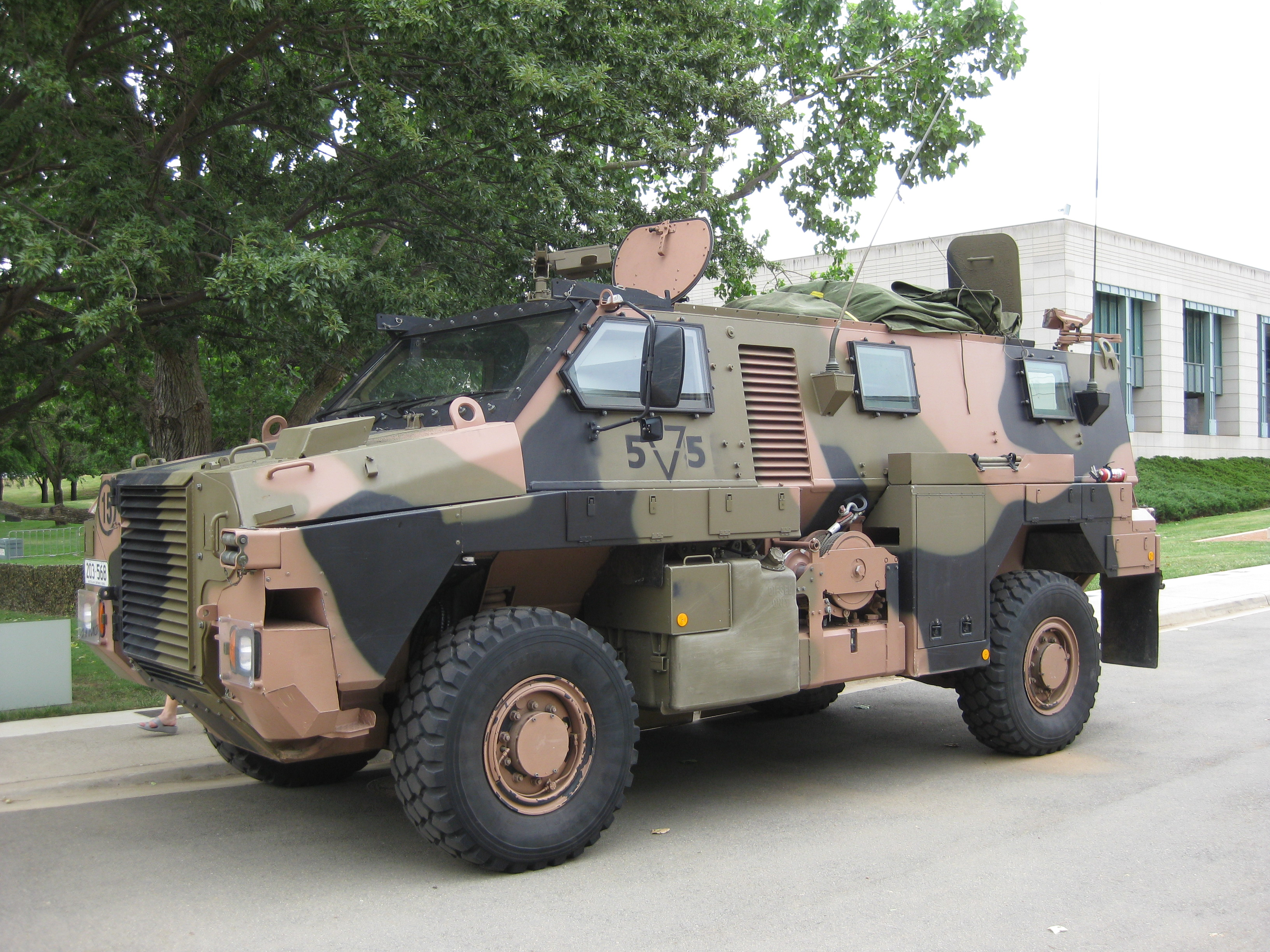
An Australian Army Bushmaster PMV on display

Next generation (LAND 121) vehicles & equipment (being introduced to service)

- Mercedes-Benz G-Wagon (multiple variants)
- Hawkei Protected Mobility Vehicle – light (PMV-L)
- Bushmaster Protected Mobility Vehicle (PMV)
- Rheinmetall MAN Military Vehicles (RMMV) consisting of the RMMV HX range of tactical trucks
- Haulmark Trailers (various)

Watercraft:

- Landing Craft Mechanised Type 8, Series II (LCM8)
- Lighter Amphibious Resupply Cargo – 5 Tonne (LARC-V)
- Landing Platform Amphibious Watercraft 2000 (LPAW 2000)

== Affiliations ==
- United Kingdom – Royal Logistic Corps (1994 – present)
- United Kingdom – Royal Corps of Transport (until 1993)

== Order of precedence ==
Preceded by Royal Australian Army Chaplains Department	Australian Army Order of Precedence	Succeeded by Royal Australian Army Medical Corps
