= List of Royal Australian Air Force groups =

This is a list of all the groups the Royal Australian Air Force has organised since it was established.

== World War II-era groups ==
- No. 1 Group RAAF
- No. 1 (Training) Group RAAF
- No. 2 Group RAAF
- No. 2 (Training) Group RAAF
- No. 4 (Maintenance) Group RAAF
- No. 5 (Maintenance) Group RAAF
- No. 9 (Operational) Group RAAF
- No. 10 (Operational) Group RAAF
- No. 11 Group RAAF

== Modern Force Element Groups (FEGs) ==
- Aerospace Operational Support Group RAAF
- Air Combat Group RAAF
- Air Force Training Group RAAF
- Air Lift Group RAAF
- Air Mobility Group RAAF
- Combat Support Group RAAF
- Maritime Patrol Group RAAF
- Strike Reconnaissance Group RAAF
- Surveillance and Control Group RAAF
- Surveillance and Response Group RAAF
- Tactical Fighter Group RAAF
- Tactical Transport Group RAAF

== See also ==
- RAAF area commands
