= Army air dispatch =

Air dispatch (UK: despatch) is a Military logistics unit providing air delivery capabilities to the British Army and the Australian Army, first formed as part of the Royal Army Service Corps and the Australian Army Service Corps during World War II. At the end of World War II as post-war demands diminished and as aircraft cargo capacity grew larger, the air dispatch units disbanded, amalgamated or absorbed into various logistics regiments. Notably Australia expanded its air dispatch capabilities in the 1960's to support counter-insurgency operations in Southeast Asia, culminating with Australia's involvement in the Vietnam War.

As of 2026, remaining active units are the 47 Air Despatch Squadron of the 13 Air Assault Support Regiment of the British Army, and the 176th Air Dispatch Squadron of the 9th Force Support Battalion of the Australian Army.

== History ==
=== World War II ===
==== Australian Army ====
The first formalised British Commonwealth air dispatch capability dates from the New Guinea campaign of World War II.

"As far as research has resolved, the first airdrops in the New Guinea campaign took place on the 28th of July 1942 at Efogi and Kagi during the withdrawal to Kokoda. In early 1943 Colonel T.G. Millner MC. Deputy Director of Supplies and Transport resolved that air supply was to be an Australian Army Service Corps (AASC) responsibility."

During the Campaign in New Guinea the 1st, 2nd and 3rd air maintenance companies, the "Biscuit Bombers", were formed from members of the Australian Army Service Corps and conducted aerial resupply operations in support of Australian and American soldiers engaged in fighting Japanese forces. At the end of World War II the air dispatch units were disbanded. A small reserve contingent maintained the capability until reformation in 1960.

==== British Army ====
Air despatch companies were first formed within the British Army's Royal Army Service Corps in March 1944. This was in preparation for the upcoming D day landings and subsequent re-invasion of the European continent. These companies saw extensive action in Operation Market Garden, the largest airborne operation of all time.

=== Post World War II ===
==== Australian Army ====
October 1960 saw the raising and training of a section of Regular Army air dispatchers, who formed a regular component of 39 Air Dispatch Platoon (Reserve) at Frenchmans Road Depot in Randwick, Sydney. In order to gain operational experience the Regular Army section of 39 AD Pl. was detached to 55 Company RASC (AD) in February 1961 for duty on the Malaya-Thailand Border. At that time duties of 55 Company RASC (AD) included the resupplying by air of the Commonwealth Brigade in their operations against the communist guerrillas. On returning to Australia the Regular Army section carried out extensive parachute training plus logistic support force supply path finding duties. A second (regular) section was formed mid-1961 and detached to 55 Company RASC (AD) for duties on the Malaya-Thailand Border from February to May 1962. Both ARA sections were then sent to Singapore in May 1962 for international exercise "Trumpeter", this was followed by heavy drop training at the Far East School of Land / Air Warfare. On return from Singapore in July 1962 a regular platoon of half strength was formed (40 AD Platoon) at Avoca Street, Randwick, using the 2 ARA sections of 39 AD Pl. as the NCO base.

By mid-1963 the unit was at full strength with detachments for operational training to the Malaya-Thailand Border, Singapore and Ubon, Thailand. The formation of HQ 1 Army Air Supply Organisation (HQ 1AASO) in February 1964 saw the rapid expansion of units dedicated to providing air transport duties with HQ. 1 AASO commanding two ARA platoons (36 and 40 AD platoons) 36 AD Platoon. being newly formed, three CMF platoons, namely 37, 38 and 39 AD platoons, plus five air supply control sections (ASCS) and an air maintenance PI manned by RAAOC personnel. At the same time a joint service (Army-RAAF) unit was raised at RAAF Base, Richmond, and designated the Air Movement Training and Development Unit (AMTDU). In the 1960s all corps courses were run by this unit for unit movement-enplaning officers and unit air loading teams, when "air portability" was the catch cry of the times.

During the period 1964 to 1965 with the Indonesian Confrontation on the Papua New Guinea border, AD sections were positioned in PNG for air dispatch duties. By early 1966 1 AASO was fully trained in trade skills (70 percent parachute trained) and military skills so much so that 36 and 40 Pls. were used as enemy for the final shake out exercise for 5 RAR in February to March 1966, prior to departure for South Vietnam. It was at this point that the requirement for an AD unit for South Vietnam was announced and the ARA units were paraded at Gospers Airfield to call for volunteers. Two officers and 40 other ranks were selected to form Det 176 AD Company RAASC.

=== Vietnam War ===
On 12 May 1967 the unit was renamed 176 AD Company and was relocated from Vung Tau to Nui Dat, where it remained until the last air dispatcher returned to Australia on 27 February 1972. At this time, while 176 AD Company was the operational unit "in country", the Australian-based unit at Wallgrove, New South Wales, was renamed 186 AD Company, acting as support. Just after the Vietnam War, air dispatch in Australia underwent command structural changes in the form of renaming the 1st Army Air Supply Organisation to the 1st Air Transport Support Regiment.

=== Post-Vietnam to the present day ===
The Royal Australian Corps of Transport (RACT) was formed on 1 June 1973 from an amalgamation of several functions from the Royal Australian Army Service Corps (which disbanded) and the Royal Australian Engineers. One of the roles allocated to RACT was the air dispatch role.

From the mid-1970s until the mid-1990s 1st Air Transport Support Regiment comprised two air dispatch squadrons: 176 AD Sqn (ARA) and 177 AD Sqn (ARes). The Army Reserve squadron was disbanded in 1994 and reservists transferred to 176 AD Sqn. Also disbanded was 1 ATSR.

176 AD Squadron is now based at RAAF Base Richmond and is a sub-unit of the 9th Force Support Battalion. The squadron includes a platoon of parachute riggers in addition to the AD troops. The riggers are not members of the RACT, they are members of the RAAOC.

In recent years elements of 176 AD Sqn have deployed to East Timor, the Solomon Islands, and the Middle East.
