= Julie Hammer =

Australian engineer and officer

- Born: 17 February 1955 (age 71); Brisbane, Queensland
- Military career
- Allegiance: Australia
- Branch: Royal Australian Air Force
- Service years: 1977–2005
- Rank: Air Vice Marshal
- Commands: Australian Defence Force Academy (2001–03); Director General Information Services (1999–2001); Electronic Warfare Squadron (1992–95)
- Awards: Member of the Order of Australia; Conspicuous Service Cross
- Other work: President of Engineers Australia; Member of the Australian War Memorial Council

Air Vice Marshal Julie Hammer, AM, CSC, FTSE, FRAeS (born 17 February 1955) is an Australian engineer and a retired senior officer in the Royal Australian Air Force (RAAF). She was the first woman to be promoted to one-star rank, and also the first woman to be promoted to two-star rank, in the Australian Defence Force. She was also the first woman to command an operational unit in the RAAF.

== Early life ==
Julie Margaret Hammer was born in Brisbane on 17 February 1955. She was educated at Brisbane Girls Grammar School. Graduating in 1971, she was placed eighth in the State of Queensland in the Senior Public Matriculation Examination. She attended the University of Queensland where she majored in Physics, graduating with a Bachelor of Science with Honours.

== Service history ==
In 1977, Hammer joined the RAAF as an Education Officer, serving in the engineer cadet squadron at Frognall, Melbourne until 1979, and then Instructor at the RAAF School of Radio at Laverton.

In 1981, the Engineer Branch was opened to women and she transferred to the Electronics Category. She managed deep-level maintenance on the RAAF's F-111, UH-1 Iroquois, CH-47 Chinook, and Canberra aircraft with No. 3 Aircraft Depot at RAAF Base Amberley. She then worked at Headquarters Support Command in the engineering management of avionics equipment for the RAAF fleet. In June 1985 she was promoted to squadron leader, and became Sub-Section Head in the Aircraft Equipment Engineering Division (AEENG3) of Headquarters Support Command at Victoria Barracks, Melbourne.

After 16 months study at No. 5 Advanced Systems Engineering Course at RAF Cranwell, she became a liaison officer in the Directorate of Scientific and Technical Intelligence at the Ministry of Defence in London. After the completion of her Master of Science thesis in Aerosystems Engineering in 1987, she became a technical intelligence analyst with the Joint Intelligence Organisation in Canberra. This was followed by work on the P-3 Orion ESM Project, first as project engineer and then, following promotion to wing commander, as project manager.

In 1992, she assumed command of the Electronic Warfare Squadron at RAAF Base Edinburgh, becoming the first woman to command an operational unit of the RAAF, for which she was awarded the Conspicuous Service Cross in the Australia Day list in 1997. She was also the recipient of the 1996 Association of Old Crows (Australian Chapter) Award for Distinguished Service to Electronic Warfare.

Returning to Canberra in 1996, she took the role of Project Director of Joint Project 2030 (JP2030), the Australian Defence Force's Joint Command Support Environment (JCSE), in the Command and Support Systems Branch of the Defence Acquisition Organisation (DAO). She completed a Graduate Diploma in Strategic Studies at the Joint Services Staff College, and became the first woman in the RAAF to become a member of the General List when she was promoted to group captain in 1996. She was seconded for four months to serve on the Science and Technology Team of the Defence Efficiency Review.

During 1999, she was the lone Australian student at the Royal College of Defence Studies, completing a 12-month course in strategic and international studies. Returning to Australia in December 1999, she was promoted to air commodore, becoming the first woman to achieve that rank and the first to be promoted to one-star rank in the ADF. When she was subsequently promoted to air vice marshal in 2003, she became the first woman to attain two-star rank in the ADF.

She assumed duties as Director General Information Services, responsible for the operations and support of Defence's fixed communications networks and computer systems throughout Australia. In December 2001, she became the first woman Commandant of the Australian Defence Force Academy. That year she was awarded the Sir Charles Kingsford Smith Memorial Medal by the Royal Aeronautical Society to recognise her contribution to Australian aerospace, and she delivered the Kingsford Smith Memorial Lecture. Also in 2001, she was inducted onto the Victorian Honour Roll of Women.

She was appointed by the Minister Assisting the Prime Minister for the Status of Women to be one of Australia's Honouring Women Ambassadors in 2002. She became the University of Queensland's 12th Alumnus of the Year in 2003, and a Member of the Order of Australia in 2004.

== Later career ==
Retiring from the RAAF in 2005, Hammer became the National Vice President of Engineers Australia, and its president in 2008. She is a director of the .au Domain Regulator, auDA. In 2008 she was elected as a Fellow of the Australian Academy of Technological Sciences and Engineering, and was appointed an Honorary Fellow of Engineers Australia in 2011.

Hammer has been married to fellow RAAF officer, Air Vice Marshal David Dunlop, since September 2000.

Military offices
Preceded by Commodore Brian Adams	Commandant of the Australian Defence Force Academy; 2001–2003	Succeeded by Commodore James Goldrick
