= No. 278 Squadron =

No. 278 Squadron may refer to:

- No. 278 Squadron RAF, in the United Kingdom
- No. 278 Squadron RAAF, in Australia
