= AATC =

AATC may refer to:

- Anglo-Argentine Tramways Company, a defunct Argentine transport company
- Asian American Theater Company, a non-profit theatre performance company
- Australian Army Transportation Corps, an Australian military unit
- Alvin and the Chipmunks, American virtual band
