= David Dunlop =

David Dunlop may refer to:

- David Dunlop (sailor) (1859–1931), Scottish Olympic sailor
- David Colin Dunlop (1897–1968), Anglican bishop
- David Dunlop (RAAF officer) (born 1949), retired Australian Air Vice Marshal
- David Dunlop (cricketer) (1855–1898), New Zealand cricketer
- Dave Dunlop (born 1965), Canadian musician

== See also ==
- David Alexander Dunlap (1863−1924), Canadian lawyer, mining company executive and philanthropist
