= RAAF Base Richmond =

Royal Australian Air Force base in Hawkesbury, New South Wales, Australia

- Richmond, New South Wales in Australia
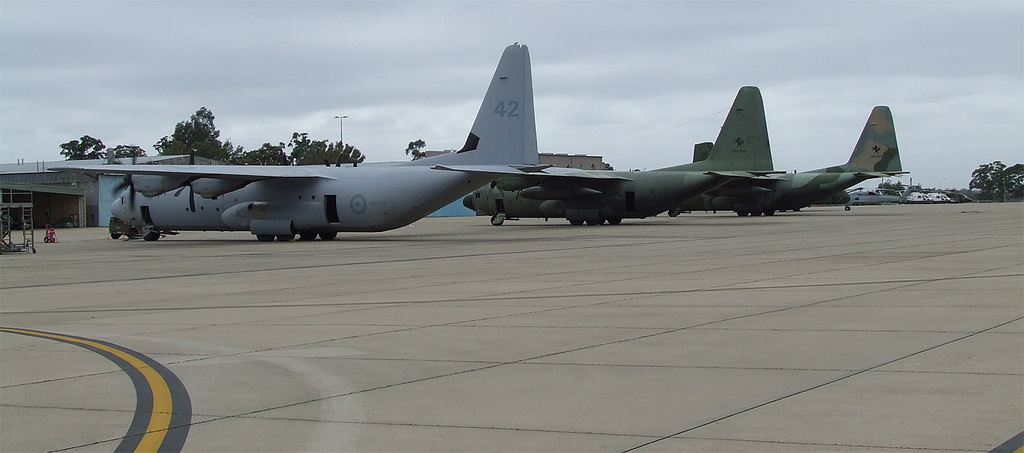
- C-130 Hercules at RAAF Base Richmond

Site information
- Type: Military air base
- Owner: Department of Defence
- Operator: Royal Australian Air Force
- Website: RAAF Base Richmond

Location
- Location in Greater Sydney
- Coordinates: 33°36′02″S 150°46′51″E

Site history
- Built: 28 August 1916
- In use: 30 June 1925 – present

Garrison information
- Past commanders: Frank Lukis
- Garrison: Air Mobility Group; No. 84 Wing; No. 86 Wing
- Occupants: No 453 Squadron Flight Richmond; No. 37 Squadron; No. 22 (City of Sydney) Squadron; No. 87 Squadron; No. 3 Aeromedical Evacuation Squadron; No. 1 Security Force Squadron Detachment Richmond; Air Movements Training and Development Unit; Air Lift Systems Program Office; No. 176 Air Dispatch Squadron

Airfield information
- Identifiers: IATA: XRH, ICAO: YSRI
- Elevation: 20 metres (67 ft) AMSL
Runways
Direction	Length and surface
10/28	2,134 metres (7,001 ft) Asphalt
- Sources: Australian AIP and aerodrome chart

RAAF Base Richmond (IATA: XRH, ICAO: YSRI) is a Royal Australian Air Force (RAAF) military air base located within the City of Hawkesbury, approximately 50 kilometres (31 mi) northwest of the Sydney Central Business District in New South Wales, Australia. Situated between the towns of Windsor and Richmond, the base is the oldest base in New South Wales and the second oldest in Australia. The base is home to the transport headquarters RAAF Air Lift Group, and its major operational formations, Nos. 84 and 86 Wings. The main aircraft type operated at the base is the Lockheed C-130 Hercules. Richmond is a regular venue for air shows and had at times been mooted as a site for Sydney's proposed second international airport.

Sited on a piece of land originally known as Ham Common, Richmond became an RAAF base in 1925. Its inaugural commander was Flight Lieutenant (later Squadron Leader) Frank Lukis, who also led the base's first flying unit, No. 3 Squadron. Many other squadrons were formed at Richmond in the ensuing years, as well as a separate Station Headquarters and No. 2 Aircraft Depot in 1936. The base expanded further during World War II, with more squadrons and other units being established there, including No. 1 (Fighter) Wing and No. 3 RAAF Hospital. It was not until after the war that it became the RAAF's transport hub, with the arrival of No. 86 Wing and its complement of C-47 Dakotas. The base began operating the Hercules in 1958, augmented in later years by the DHC-4 Caribou and Boeing 707.

== History ==
A military flying school was set up at the site of the present-day RAAF base on 28 August 1916, when the area was known as Ham Common. RAAF Station Richmond was established on 30 June 1925 as the fledgling service's first air base outside Victoria. Its initial flying unit was No. 3 (Army Cooperation) Squadron, operating Airco DH.9 light bombers and Royal Aircraft Factory S.E.5 fighters, and for the next decade the commanding officer of No. 3 Squadron was also in charge of the base. Among these were Squadron Leaders Frank Lukis (1925–30), Harry Cobby (1930–31), and Bill Bostock (1931–33). Headquarters RAAF Station Richmond was formed as a separate entity on 20 April 1936, under the command of Group Captain Adrian "King" Cole. Other units, including No. 22 Squadron flying Hawker Demons, and No. 2 Aircraft Depot, had been established in the preceding months. No. 4 (General Reconnaissance) Squadron was formed in May 1937, followed by No. 6 (General Reconnaissance) Squadron in March 1939. Two Fleet Cooperation units were also established, No. 5 Squadron in April 1936 and No. 9 Squadron in January 1939. No. 23 (General Purpose) Squadron formed in February 1939. As well as an Air Force base, in its pre-war days Richmond was used as a supplementary airport for Sydney; various aviation pioneers employed it in the 1930s, including Charles Kingsford Smith and Jean Batten.

Commanded by Group Captain Hippolyte "Kanga" De La Rue, Richmond's combat units at the outbreak of World War II included No. 3 Squadron (flying Hawker Demons), Nos. 6 and 22 Squadrons (Avro Ansons), and No. 9 Squadron (Supermarine Seagulls). On 4 September 1939, the day after Australia declared war, the base's first wartime sortie took place, a flight of three Ansons and three Seagulls patrolling the ocean off Sydney. Richmond expanded significantly during the war, and many flying units originated there including No. 11 Squadron in September 1939, No. 30 (Beaufighter) Squadron and No. 100 (Beaufort) Squadron in March 1942, No. 54 Squadron RAF in August 1942, No. 452 Squadron RAF in September 1942, No. 1 (Fighter) Wing in October 1942, and No. 84 (Boomerang) Squadron in February 1943. Several auxiliaries were also formed including training schools, salvage units, and over thirty radar stations. No. 2 Recruit Depot came into being in January 1940, and the resultant expansion of temporary accommodation resulted in a "tin city" on the fringes of the base. The Australian Army also utilised the base for parachute training. No. 3 RAAF Hospital was established in October 1940. Following the war, Richmond became home to most of the RAAF's transport aircraft. No. 86 (Transport) Wing, made up of Nos. 36 and 38 Squadrons flying C-47 Dakotas, arrived from RAAF Station Schofields in June 1949. The wing relocated to Canberra in 1954, but returned to Richmond four years later. No. 11 Squadron, which had disbanded in 1946, returned to Richmond in 1954 operating P-2 Neptune maritime reconnaissance aircraft, and remained until transferring to RAAF Base Edinburgh, South Australia in 1968.

Headquarters RAAF Base Richmond was formed in April 1952 to replace the former Station Headquarters, along with a subordinate unit, Base Squadron Richmond, for the day-to-day running of the establishment. The base was evacuated in February 1956 due to the threat of rising floodwaters nearby, the only time in its history that flooding in the Hawkesbury region became serious enough to warrant such action. In 1958–59, No. 36 Squadron began operating its first C-130 Hercules heavy transports, which were augmented by No. 38 Squadron's DHC-4 Caribou tactical transports in 1964. No. 86 Wing was disbanded in August that year, but reformed in February 1987, under the newly established Headquarters Air Lift Group that replaced the former Base Headquarters. At the same time, Base Squadron was reformed as Base Support Wing. No. 86 Wing took control of No. 33 Squadron, operating Boeing 707 jet tanker/transports, as well as Nos. 36 and 37 Squadrons, flying Hercules. No. 486 Maintenance Squadron and Air Movements Training and Development Unit (AMTDU) were also under its aegis at Richmond. The Hercules, Caribous and 707s became synonymous with disaster relief and emergency transport in Australia and the region, as well as deploying on overseas peacekeeping missions. Richmond was the venue for many air shows including, in 1988, the largest staged in Australia to that date, celebrating the Australian Bicentenary. The base also staged the RAAF's 70th Anniversary Air show in 1991, the same year that the Hercules achieved 500,000 accident-free hours of operation.

By the early 2000s, No. 33 Squadron had been transferred to the recently re-established No. 84 Wing, and AMTDU to No. 85 Wing, while the Base Support Wing had been superseded by Combat Support Unit Richmond. No. 36 Squadron, having transferred its C-130Hs to No. 37 Squadron and re-equipped with the C-17 Globemaster, relocated to RAAF Base Amberley, Queensland, in November 2006. The RAAF's DHC-4 Caribous, which had been operated for some years by No. 38 Squadron out of RAAF Base Townsville, were retired at the end of 2009, to be replaced by Super King Airs built by Hawker Pacific. No. 37 Squadron was transferred from No. 86 Wing to No. 84 Wing on 1 October 2010. In January 2013, No. 35 Squadron was re-formed at Richmond, under the control of No. 84 Wing. Initially a cadre, the squadron will expand to approximately 250 personnel by 2015, when it will begin operating the RAAF's ten C-27J Spartan transport aircraft.

In the 1980s, RAAF Base Richmond had been strongly considered as a second international airport for Sydney, but no decision was taken at the time. By 2009, it was reported as being the New South Wales Government's preferred location for a secondary airport, but that any decision on a location would be the Federal Government's responsibility. In July 2012, the Federal Government decided against Richmond as a second airport, but had commissioned a study into whether the base could be employed for "limited civil operations". In September 2016 the Chief of Air Force, Air Marshal Leo Davies, stated that the RAAF favoured closing RAAF Base Richmond during the next 15 years as its functions had been declining, and the major investment in infrastructure needed to bring it to a "fighting state" could be better spent upgrading other bases. However, Minister for Defence Marise Payne stated that the Government was not considering closing the base.

In 2014, the NSW Rural Fire Service began using Richmond as a base for its Large Air Tanker (LAT) and Very Large Air Tanker (VLAT) program. During the Australian summer, the NSW RFS will have a variety of aircraft available including a C-130 Hercules, Avro RJ85, Boeing 737 and McDonnell Douglas DC-10 as well as smaller lead-in aircraft. As of 2019, the NSW RFS has purchased its own Boeing 737 which is now permanently based at Richmond.

== Units ==
The following units are located at RAAF Base Richmond:

Unit	Full name	Force Element Group	Aircraft	Notes
HQALG	Headquarters Air Lift Group	Air Lift Group		
84WNG	Headquarters No. 84 Wing	Air Lift Group		Controls Nos. 34, 35, 37, and 285 Squadrons
85WNG	Air Movements Training & Development Unit	Air Lift Group		Aerial delivery development, training and certification
	Air Mobility Control Centre	Air Lift Group		
37SQN	No. 37 Squadron	Air Lift Group	C-130J Hercules	
22SQN	No. 22 (City of Sydney) Squadron	Combat Support Group		Reserve and expeditionary/airfield services
1CCS	No. 1 Combat Communication Squadron Detachment Richmond	Combat Support Group		
1ADS	No. 1 Airfield Defence Squadron Detachment Richmond	Combat Support Group		Airfield defence guards
1AOSS	No. 1 Airfield Operations Support Squadron Detachment Richmond	Combat Support Group		Airfield operations and engineering
3EHS	No. 3 Expeditionary Health Squadron Detachment Richmond			
87SQN	No. 87 Squadron	Aerospace Operational Support Group		Intelligence/photography
453SQN	No. 453 Squadron Flight Richmond	Surveillance and Response Group		Air traffic services
	Air Lift Systems Program Office			Capability Acquisition and Sustainment Group medium airlift sustainment
176ADS	176 Air Dispatch Squadron			Army aerial dispatching
336SQN AAFC	336 Squadron AAFC			Australian Air Force Cadets-3 Wing

== Gallery ==
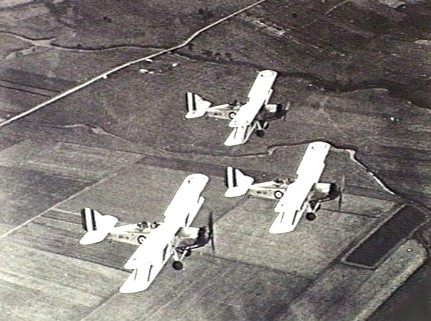
Westland Wapitis of No. 3 Squadron in the Richmond area, October 1932

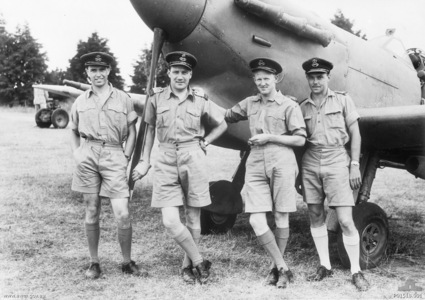
No. 54 Squadron Spitfire pilots, Richmond, 1942

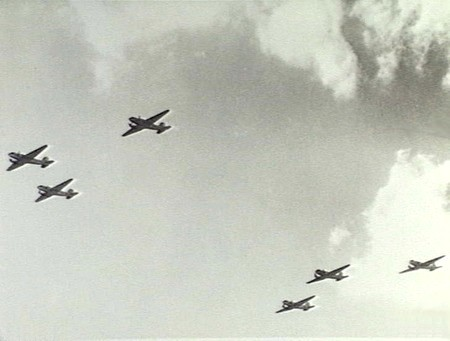
No. 86 Wing Dakotas during a fly-past in 1952

== See also ==
- List of airports in Greater Sydney
- List of airports in New South Wales
- List of Royal Australian Air Force installations
- No. 131 Radar Station RAAF
