= 10th Force Support Battalion (Australia) =

Australian Army unit

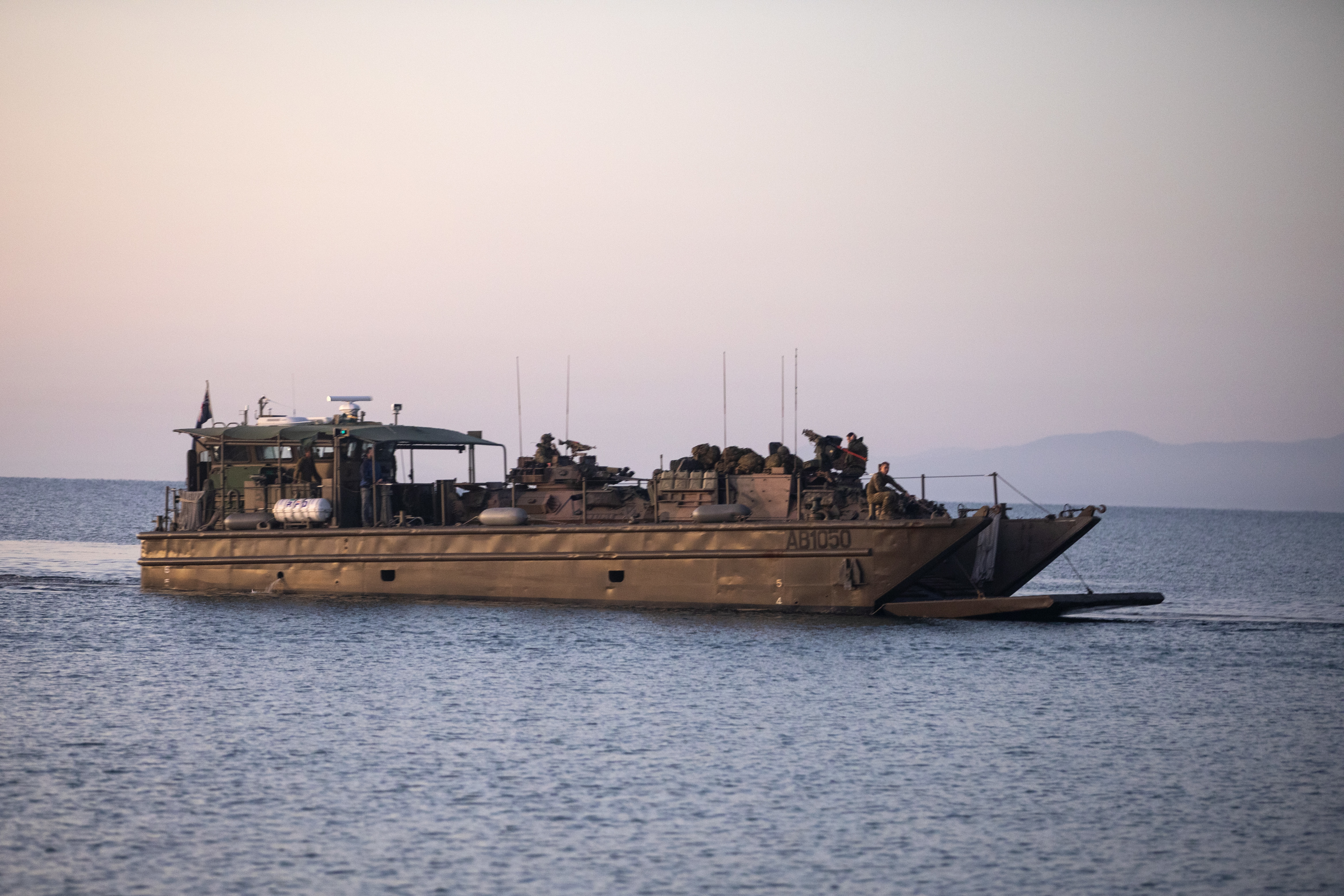
- Landing Craft Mechanised Type 8 (LMC8) operated by 35th Water Transport Squadron
- Active: 1998 – present
- Country: Australia
- Branch: Army
- Type: Logistics
- Size: Battalion
- Part of: 17th Sustainment Brigade
- Garrison/HQ: HQ at Ross Island Barracks, Townsville
- Mottos: Unity, Strength, Commitment
- Decorations: Meritorious Unit Citation

Insignia
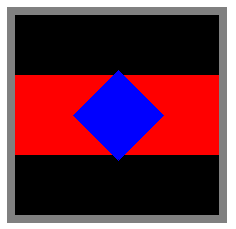
- Unit colour patch

The 10th Force Support Battalion (10 FSB) is an Australian Army logistics battalion and is part of the 17th Sustainment Brigade. Its role is to provide third line or 'general' support within an area of operations.

10 FSB is located at Lavarack Barracks and Ross Island Barracks in Townsville, Queensland, with Catering elements located in Darwin, Adelaide, Brisbane and Amberley. A Squadron of Engineers is located in Sydney and a Troop of Water Transport is located in Darwin.

== History ==
10 FSB was formed on 1 March 1998, following the amalgamation of the 10th Terminal Regiment, 2nd Field Logistics Battalion and the 1st Division Postal Unit.

The battalion was awarded a Meritorious Unit Citation for operations in East Timor during INTERFET in 1999–2000, the first logistics unit to be honoured with such an award.

In March 2026 the 10th Force Support Battalion's 35th Water Transport Squadron and Littoral Riverine Survey Squadron were transferred to the newly-established Littoral Manoeuvre Group.

== Structure ==
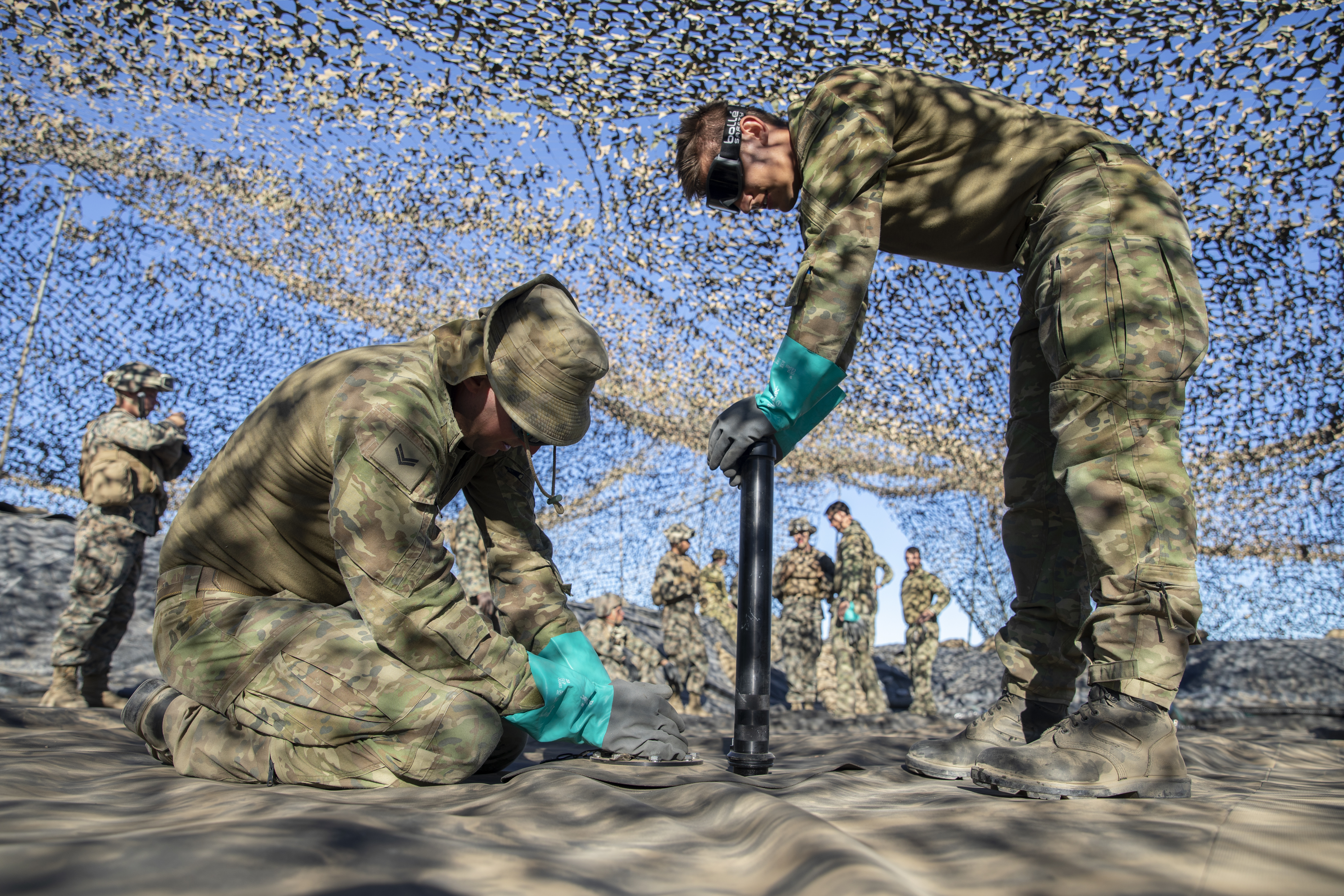
10th Force Support Battalion petroleum operators during Exercise Talisman Sabre 2021

As of 2016, the 10th Force Support Battalion consisted of:

- Battalion Headquarters (Townsville)
  - 1st Catering Company (Townsville, Darwin, Adelaide, Brisbane, Amberley)
  - 2nd Combat Supply Company (Townsville)
  - 10th Logistic Support Company (Townsville)
  - 30th Terminal Squadron (Townsville)
    - 68 Terminal Support Troop (including Amphibious Beach Team)
    - 69 Terminal Support Troop
    - 72 Terminal Support Troop
  - Ship’s Army Detachment HMAS Choules
