= David Dunlop (RAAF officer) =

- Born: 11 February 1949 (age 77); Brisbane, Queensland
- Spouse: Julie Hammer
- Military career
- Allegiance: Australia
- Branch: Royal Australian Air Force
- Service years: 1967–2005
- Rank: Air Vice Marshal
- Commands: Strike Reconnaissance Group (2000–01); No. 82 Wing (1993–96); No. 1 Squadron (1987–89)
- Awards: Conspicuous Service Cross

Air Vice Marshal David Joseph Dunlop, CSC (born 11 February 1949) is a retired officer of the Royal Australian Air Force (RAAF). He is married to another retired officer, Air Vice Marshal Julie Hammer.

Dunlop was awarded a Conspicuous Service Cross in 1995 in recognition of service to the RAAF in the field of F-111 aircraft operations.
