= Wait for the Wagon =

"Wait For The Wagon"
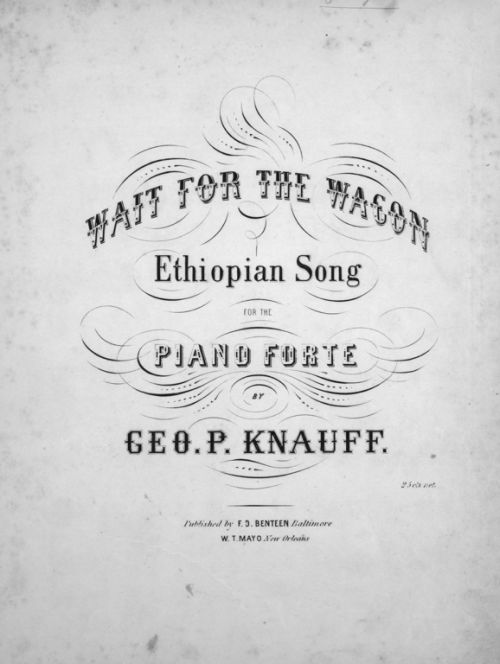
- 1851 sheet music cover

Song
- Published: 1851
- Genre: American folk song
- Songwriter(s): Geo. P Knauff

"Wait for the Wagon" is an American folk song, first popularized in the early 1850s.

"Wait for the Wagon" was first published as a parlor song in New Orleans, Louisiana, with an 1850 copyright, and music attributed to Wiesenthal and the lyrics to "a lady". All subsequent versions seem to derive from this song.

Bing Crosby included the song in a medley on his album 101 Gang Songs (1961)

== History ==
A number of different versions were published the next year.

Along the Mississippi River, most were nearly identical to the 1850 publication. Peters, Webb and Co. in Louisville, Kentucky, published it as "Wait For The Wagon: A Song For The South West" with no attribution to music or lyrics.

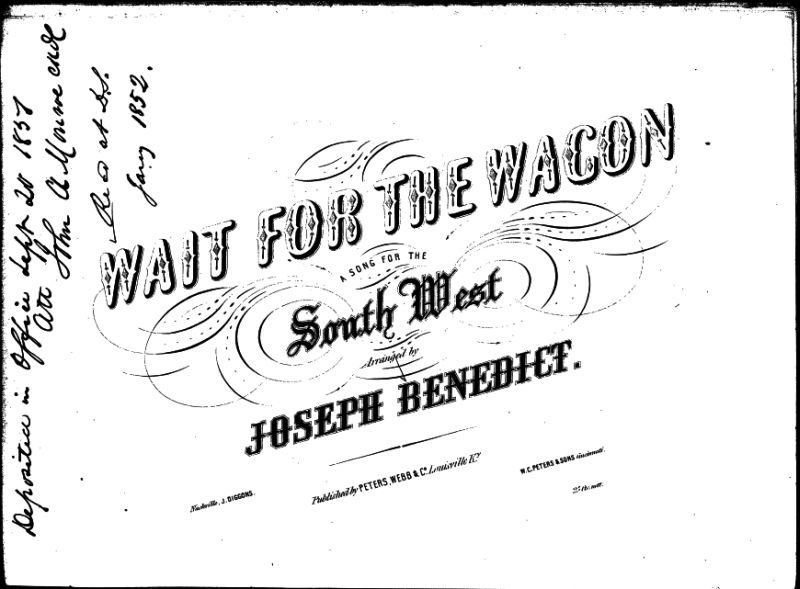
Cover of "Wait For The Wagon", 1851.

On the east coast several versions were published as minstrel songs with slightly different lyrics and differently arranged music. One was published in May 1851 ("Wait For The Wagon: Ethiopian Song") in Baltimore, Maryland, and it was attributed to George P. Knauff. It is agreed upon that R. Bishop Buckley (1810–1867) probably first performed the song and Knauff arranged it as a composition. Knauff was a music teacher in Virginia, who compiled popular and folk fiddle tunes into a large compendium, Virginia Reels (1839). Buckley was born in England and came to America as a young man and, with his father and two brothers, formed the Buckley Serenaders. This minstrel show toured America and Europe.

J.E. Boswell also published a minstrel version ("Wait For The Wagon: A New Ethiopian Song & Melody") in 1851, as arranged by W. Loftin Hargrave.

Wait for the Wagon was also published in London circa 1847 - 1869.

The song became a hit in the Eastern United States, and other minstrel troupes added it to their own performances. Through them, it spread to the South and West. It remained particularly popular in the Ozarks and Mississippi through the Civil War.

This tune was also the Regimental March of The Royal Corps of Transport, a part of the British Army formed in 1965 from The Royal Army Service Corps and elements of The Royal Engineers. The corps was amalgamated with several others to form The Royal Logistic Corps in 1993, and this tune was superseded by the march 'On Parade'. The tune however is still used as the march for Royal Australian Corps of Transport.

A version of the song, entitled "The Southern Wagon" was written during the American Civil War by soldiers in the Confederacy. The lyrics glorify and justify their secession, and mentions both the Battle of First Manassas and General P. G. T. Beauregard. A Unionist version was also published, "The Old Union Wagon." This compared the wagon itself to the Union, as it was built out of "Charter Oak", and enjoined listeners to "stick to our Wagon."

A version of the song was written as a campaign song for President Millard Fillmore in the 1850s.

In 2001, Leapfrog Enterprises released the Fun and Learn Phonics Bus, the Alphabet Pal caterpillar, and the Discovery Ball. An instrumental version of this song plays in the music mode, but only if the letter Z is pressed. It was later played on the LeapStart Learning Table a year later when you press the banjo spinner at a certain point in the music setting.

== Comparison of original to minstrel and Civil War lyrics ==
Wait for the Wagon as a military tune
Wait For The Wagon
Recorded excerpt of the 'Wait for the Wagon' march tune as played by the concert band of the Royal Corps of Transport Association.

A Song For The South West (1851)

(First verse)

Will you come my Phillis dearie to the wild mountain free,
Where the river runs so pretty, and ride along with me,
And you shall be so happy with your Jacob by your side,
So wait for the wagon, and we'll all take a ride.
(Chorus)

So wait for the wagon, Oh! wait for the wagon,
Oh! wait for the wagon and we'll all take a ride.
Oh! wait for the wagon and we'll all take a ride.

Ethiopian Song (1851)

(First verse)

Will you come with me my Phillis dear, to yon blue mountain free,
Where the blossoms smell the sweetest, come rove along with me.
It's ev'ry sunday morning when I am by your side,
We'll jump into the Wagon, and all take a ride.
Wait for the Wagon, Wait for the Wagon,
Wait for the Wagon, and we'll all take a ride.
(Chorus)

Wait for the Wagon, Wait for the Wagon,
Wait for the Wagon, Wait for the Wagon,
Wait for the Wagon, and we'll all take a ride

The Southern Wagon (1861)

(First verse)

Come, all ye sons of freedom, and join our Southern band,
We are going to fight the Yankees, and drive them from our land.
Justice is our motto, and providence our guide,
So jump into the wagon, and we'll all take a ride!
(Chorus)

Wait for the wagon, the dissolution wagon!
The South is the wagon, and we'll all take a ride!

The South West versions was popular enough that "Answer To Wait For The Wagon" was published in 1852, the first verse of which opens with:

I thank you, Mister Jacob, but I'm not inclin'd to go,
Your wagon is so clumsy, and your team so very slow.

== Bibliography ==
- Benedict, Joseph (arranger). "Wait For The Wagon: A Song For The South West". Louisville, Kentucky: Peters, Webb and Co. (1851).
- Fuld, James (1966).The Book of World Famous Music, Classical, Popular and Folk.
- Hargrave, W. Loftin (arranger). "Wait For The wagon A New Ethiopian Song & Melody". Baltimore: J. E. Boswell (1851).
- Knauff, George P. (arranger). "Wait For The Wagon: Ethiopian Song". Baltimore: F. D. Benteen (1851).
- Morris, George (words); W. Wallace (music). "Answer To Wait For The Wagon". Louisville, Kentucky: G.W. Brainard & Co. (1852).
- Raph, Theodore (1964). The American Song Treasury: 100 Favorites. Mineola, New York: Dover Publications.
- Waltz, Robert B; David G. Engle. "Wait For The Wagon ". The Traditional Ballad Index: An Annotated Bibliography of the Folk Songs of the English-Speaking World. Hosted by California State University, Fresno, Folklore, 2007.
