= No. 278 Squadron RAAF =

278 Squadron
- Active: 1 July 2003 – 17 December 2020
- Country: Australia
- Branch: Royal Australian Air Force
- Role: Technical training
- Part of: Air Combat Group, 78 Wing
- base: RAAF Base Amberley
- Motto(s): Prepare to Defend and Strike

No 278 Squadron was a Royal Australian Air Force unit formed on 1 July 2003 and disbanded on 17 December 2020. The squadron's formation removed day-to-day management responsibility of No. 78 Wing RAAF Technical Training and Operational Flight Trainer support elements from the Wing Headquarters.

No 278 Squadron had a combined Air Force/Australian Public Service workforce serving in Technical Training Flights at Williamtown and Amberley. The Squadron Headquarters was located at RAAF Base Amberley.

== Purpose ==
To Provide Technical Training and Operational Flight Trainers in support of Air Combat Group Operations.

== History ==
On 1 July 2003 278 Squadron was born from a pressing need to standardise and achieve efficiencies in the training of Air Combat Group RAAF (ACG) personnel. ACG's mission – to deliver Australia's capability to Control the Air and to Conduct Precision Strike – is unachievable without highly trained aircrew and maintenance teams. With permanent staff members supporting ACG training around Australia in RAAF Base Williamtown and RAAF Base Amberley. 278SQN trained ACG maintainers.

Establishing highly trained personnel takes years of dedicated training commitment. 278SQN delivered this training through Technical Training Flights for maintainers. Technical Training Flights provided training support through numerous methods.

The squadron was disbanded on 17 December 2020, with its functions being assumed by the No. 2 Operational Conversion Unit Integrated Training Centre and 82WG Technical Training Flight.
