= No. 131 Radar Station RAAF =

131 Radar Station
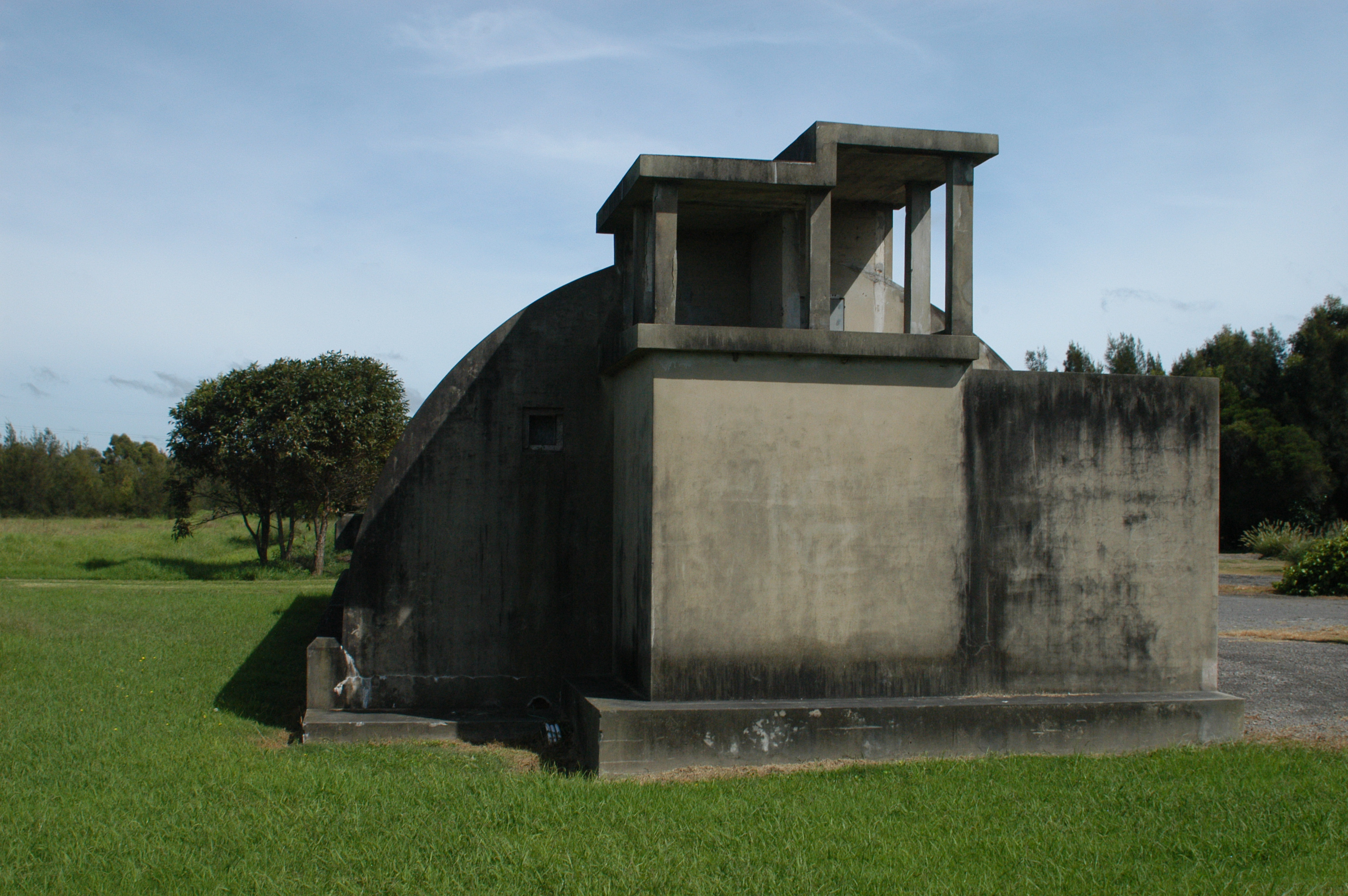

- Location within New South Wales Location within Australia
- 32.8417°S 151.7149°E
- Location: Ash Island, Kooragang, City of Newcastle, New South Wales, Australia

History
- Built: 1942–1946

Site notes
- Owner: Office of Environment and Heritage

New South Wales Heritage Register
- Official name: 131 Radar Station (former); Radar Igloo; Radar Buildings
- Type: state heritage (built)
- Designated: 16 April 2010
- Reference no.: 1815
- Type: Defence radar station
- Category: Defence

No. 131 Radar Station RAAF is a heritage-listed former Royal Australian Air Force radar station at Kooragang, City of Newcastle, New South Wales, Australia. They are also known as the Radar Igloo and Radar Buildings. They now operate as the Estuarine Interpretive Centre.

It was formed at Richmond, New South Wales on 19 June 1942. After initial training the radar group was sent to Beverley Park, Kogarah on 14 August 1942, then Kyeemagh on 27 August 1942 and to its final posting at Ash Island, Kooragang, Newcastle from 7 September 1942.

The radar station on Ash Island was established to detect enemy airborne threats during World War II. It housed British mobile equipment and the most modern Canadian GCI set, which was well protected in two concrete reinforced igloo buildings. No. 131 Radar Station RAAF was disbanded on 18 January 1946.

The remains of the Ash Island radar station, which the unit occupied from September 1942 until January 1946, were added to the New South Wales State Heritage Register on 16 April 2010.

== History ==
The earliest inhabitants of the lower Hunter River estuary were the Worimi and Awabakal Aboriginal groups. For thousands of years, these people hunted and gathered food around the many small islands within the estuary. In 1951 when five low-lying islands were reclaimed and joined to make the industrial Kooragang Island, the natural landscape underwent substantial change which has seen a significant loss in the physical remnants of Aboriginal occupation of the area.

Following European contact and Newcastle's settlement in 1804, the rich alluvial soil of the islands in the Hunter River estuary attracted the settlers who began farming and grazing the land. Ash Island was to become a significant site for dairy farming but with regular flooding with the estuary, these practices became increasingly difficult.

When Japan entered the World War II, there was widespread apprehension that Australia may be vulnerable to enemy attack and invasion. In early 1942, the armed services directed increased attention to radar for locating and intercepting enemy aircraft in an effort to protect Australia's coastline and its strategically important towns and cities. These efforts intensified again following the submarine attacks on Sydney Harbour and Newcastle on 8 June 1942.

Although the shelling of Newcastle resulted in no physical injuries and very little material damage, the event caused panic and highlighted the vulnerability of Newcastle and its industries to enemy attack. During the Second World War, the industrial city of Newcastle was at the centre of Australia's total war effort. Bullet-proof steel and armoured vehicles, heavy guns, ammunition, explosive shells, shipping and aircraft sections and a host of other essential parts and products were manufactured in Newcastle and, being strategically important, the most advanced technology was required to protect the city from any further attacks.

Only 12 days after Newcastle was shelled, 131 Radar Station was formed at RAAF Base Richmond. This mobile Ground Control Interception (GCI) unit was based on British radar practices that emerged in 1940 to detect and intercept enemy aircraft before they reached the intended target. This state-of-the-art British technology allowed the operators to obtain grid references without the need to calculate the coordinates manually thus saving critical time. 131 Radar Station also used uniquely advanced technology because the operators were able to estimate, in addition to direction and range, the size and height of the aircraft by assessing the strength of the signals received.

Originally this mobile GCI unit, made up of British Mark V equipment, was housed on the back of 4x4 Crossley trucks, camouflaged underneath netted canopies. In August 1942, 131 Radar Station was moved to Beverley Park at Kogarah and then on to Kyeemagh where a series of test flights were logged to assess the performance of the equipment and the skills of the operating staff. In September 1942, the mobile unit received instructions and were transferred to Ash Island to be responsible for the protection of Newcastle.

Upon arrival on Ash Island, the operating staff were met with swampland, mangroves and mosquitoes. Although facilities were limited, the Island was an ideal location for 131 Radar Station because the surrounding water was a good reflector, assisting the radar to detect any aircraft.

By late 1942, Ash Island, although fairly typical of small RAAF stations on the coast, had become a permanent radar post and the operating staff was at full strength (two Commanding Officers, 25 RAAF and 22 Women's Auxiliary Australian Air Force (WAAAF)). On 16 December 1942, 131 Radar Station commenced 24-hour watch and by the end of January 1943, the new Mark V transmitter and receiver, the latest equipment and technology from Canada, arrived at Ash Island in preparation for the construction of galvanized "Doover" huts (a half-mile north west of the camp) to house the station.

By February 1943, the WAAAF complement at 131 Radar Station outnumbered the RAAF contingent for the first time and included many of the first group of WAAAF radar operators trained at Richmond.

Also in February 1943, the Crossley trucks that had housed the mobile GCI units left Ash Island for Maroubra and the construction of the two concrete igloos, with walls one foot thick, was underway. The almost impenetrable igloos were British in design and were intended to be built as underground bunkers. However, in Australia, these buildings were constructed above ground but disguised with netting.

By mid 1943, the igloos were complete and the receiver and transmitter equipment installed in one and an emergency power unit housed in the other. The new Canadian equipment delivered to 131 Radar Station was state-of-the-art technology that was operated by the experienced and competent teams at Ash Island. The unit was divided into teams of five operators and one mechanic to work in shifts of six hours over the 24-hour period. The functions of the operators rotated every 30 minutes and covered the antenna rotation, Plan Position Indicator (PPI) tube, range/height tube and plotting table as well as an officer to keep a running order of all plots and heights taken. Meanwhile, the mechanic focussed on the transmitter and, along with the Commanding Officer, was responsible for supervising the maintenance and operation of the equipment.

Although the staff at 131 Radar Station were trained and prepared for conflict, as the war progressed and the threat of enemy invasion lessened, the station assumed a secondary role as a training and demonstration centre for radar officers, controllers, recorders, operators and mechanics. The day-to-day activities were maintained by the WAAAF officers, however, in January 1945, 131 Radar Station was put on "Care and Maintenance" service and the staff contingent was reduced severely. On 18 January 1946, 131 Radar Station was officially disbanded.

Since completion of its active duty during World War II, 131 Radar Station has become the Estuarine Interpretive Centre (EIC) as part of the Kooragang Wetland Rehabilitation Project. The Centre is an educational centre that houses interpretive material illustrating the estuarine ecosystem as well as the history of the island.

Comparisons with other RAAF Radar Stations in New South Wales

During World War II, hundreds of radar stations were built along the Australian coastline to detect and intercept signals from any approaching enemies. Of the 100 or more built in Australia, there are very few remaining intact. With the stations and the associated camps being largely built of lightweight and portable structures, there is little built fabric remaining in situ other than concrete foundations on which the aerial structures were built.

Other than 131 Radar Station (former) at Ash Island, the only other significantly-intact station remaining in NSW is the RAAF 208 Radar Station at Catherine Hill Bay. This site was listed on the State Heritage Register in July 2008.

Located south of Newcastle, the 208 Radar Station was an Advanced Chain Overseas (ACO) unit that utilised a different form of radar technology than the Ground Control Interception unit (GCI) installed at Ash Island. However, the 208 Radar Station did use the aboveground concrete igloo structures to house the radar equipment as did the 131 Radar Station (former).

== Description of the Ash Island remains ==
The 131 Radar Station (former) is located on Ash Island, on the western end of Kooragang Island. Situated north of Newcastle, Kooragang Island is located at the mouth of the Hunter River Estuary between the north and south arms of the river.

The land, on which 131 Radar Station (former) is located, is bounded by the following coordinates:

32 degrees 50'31.89"S, 151 degrees 42'55.57"E
32 degrees 50'31.13"S, 151 degrees 42'50.72"E
32 degrees 50'28.63"S, 151 degrees 42'51.48"E
32 degrees 50'29.29"S, 151 degrees 42'56.21"E

The 131 Radar Station (former) includes two semi-cylindrical igloos, constructed of concrete approximately one foot thick and positioned approximately 50 metres apart. These igloos were British in design and were intended to be underground bunkers. However, the 131 Radar Station (former) (along with similar other stations in Australia) were constructed above ground and camouflaged while in use.

The interior of the larger igloo was painted by Lyn Skillings with a mural depicting the natural environment. Some external plaster restoration was carried out in 1994 but this is deteriorating.

There is a commemorative plaque mounted on the larger igloo that was unveiled during the National "BLIPS" Radar Reunion of 1995. The plaque states:

"Ash Island Radar Site
This plaque commemorates the operations conducted by No.131 Radar Station from 16th December 1942 until 18th January 1946.
No.131 Radar Station was located here and controlled the fighter aircraft based at RAAF Base Williamtown.
No.131 Radar Station employed British MkV and Canadian RWG/GCI radars.
This plaque is presented by the personnel of No.3 Control and Reporting Unit and the Radar Air Defence Branch of the RAAF Association in commemoration of the 50th anniversary of victory in the Pacific.
15th August 1995"

The site also contains remnant concrete footings and a base for an antenna stand.

The camp site that provided accommodation and living facilities for the on-site officers was located south east of the Radar Station but there are no visible remnants remaining in situ.

A modern toilet facility was installed on the site in the late 1990s. Designed by Chris Tucker, the contemporary addition is sympathetic to the military heritage of the 131 Radar Station.

The two concrete igloos are in good condition but the associated structures and features of the Radar Station are no longer remaining in situ.

The two concrete igloo buildings are in good condition but there is some deterioration of the external concrete plaster. The associated structures and features of the Radar Station, situated southeast of the igloo buildings, are no longer remaining in situ.

== Heritage listing ==
The 131 Radar Station (former) has State significance as one of the few remaining radar igloos surviving in NSW from World War II. Originally formed as a mobile unit, the station was moved to its permanent base at Ash Island in September 1942.

The almost-impenetrable concrete igloo buildings, based on a British underground bunker design, were constructed aboveground by mid-1943 and were used to house the advanced technology needed to detect approaching enemy aircraft.

The 131 Radar Station (former) is also significant for its association with the RAAF and WAAAF officers who served at the station during its active service.

131 Radar Station was listed on the New South Wales State Heritage Register on 16 April 2010 having satisfied the following criteria.

The place is important in demonstrating the course, or pattern, of cultural or natural history in New South Wales.

The 131 Radar Station (former) has State significance as one of the few remaining radar igloos surviving in NSW from World War II. Following the shelling of Newcastle in June 1942, the Australian armed services directed its attentions to a new type of radar which enabled Ground Controlled Interception (GCI), in an effort to protect Australia's coastline from attacks by enemy aircraft. Originally formed at the Richmond Air Base, 131 Radar Station was a mobile unit that was moved to its permanent base at Ash Island in September 1942. The almost-impenetrable concrete igloos were constructed by mid-1943 and were used to house the advanced technology needed to detect and intercept signals from approaching enemy aircraft.

The place has a strong or special association with a person, or group of persons, of importance of cultural or natural history of New South Wales's history.

The 131 Radar Station (former) has State significance for its association with the officers of the RAAF (Royal Australian Air Force) and WAAAF (Women's Auxiliary Australian Air Force) who served at the station during its active service in World War II. When the station was at full strength, the small but highly trained contingent was made up of 25 RAAF and 22 WAAAF officers.

The place is important in demonstrating aesthetic characteristics and/or a high degree of creative or technical achievement in New South Wales.

The 131 Radar Station (former) has local significance for its aesthetic values. The two semi-cylindrical concrete igloos are distinctive in design and have a unique presence in the natural landscape of Ash Island. Originally designed by the British as underground bunkers, the Australian igloos were constructed aboveground but camouflaged with netting to disguise the buildings during active service.

The place has strong or special association with a particular community or cultural group in New South Wales for social, cultural or spiritual reasons.

The 131 Radar Station (former) has State significance for its social value to the NSW community and for the former RAAF and WAAAF officers who served at the site. In June 1942, the shelling of Newcastle by the Japanese caused panic in NSW and action was quickly taken by the Australian armed services to establish the 131 Radar Station which was to serve and protect Newcastle from aircraft attack for several years.

In 1995, there was a reunion for the officers that served at the station during World War II and a plaque to commemorate these efforts was unveiled for the event. The igloos are now used as a display centre for the history of the island and an educational centre and for the Kooragang Wetland Rehabilitation Project that is working towards restoring the environment of the surrounding Hunter River estuary.

The place has potential to yield information that will contribute to an understanding of the cultural or natural history of New South Wales.

The 131 Radar Station (former) has State significance as a unique example of the advanced technology used to detect and intercept enemy aircraft during World War II. Being one of the earliest Ground Control Interception (GCI) units in NSW, the 131 Radar Station used an improved radar technology which could detect and gauge the direction, range and height of enemy aircraft more rapidly thus proving to be valuable in the protection of the NSW coastline during World War II.

The place possesses uncommon, rare or endangered aspects of the cultural or natural history of New South Wales.

The 131 Radar Station (former) has State significance as a rare example of a surviving radar station built during World War II. Over 100 radar stations were built during the war but the survival of the 131 Radar Station (former) is rare in NSW and it is a unique site that employed Ground Control Interception (GCI) technology to protect NSW from enemy aircraft attack during World War II. (see History - Comparisons with other RAAF radar stations in NSW).

The place is important in demonstrating the principal characteristics of a class of cultural or natural places/environments in New South Wales.

The 131 Radar Station (former) has State significance as a representative example of a RAAF station built along the NSW coast during World War II. After Newcastle was shelled by the Japanese in June 1942, the Australian armed services quickly took action and set up the 131 Radar Station to serve and protect Newcastle from aircraft attack. Attention was directed towards radio direction and location and, by the end of 1942, an extensive network of radar units had been developed. Each of these stations could plot direction and range but 131 Radar Station, being a Ground Control Interception (GCI) unit, also had the advanced technology to gauge height from the signals received.

== Commanding officers ==
- J.R. Wallace (PltOff) – 29 June 1942
- G.P. Phillips (PltOff) – 3 August 1942
- A.W.F. Williams (FlgOff) – 9 March 1943
- K.N. Drummond (FlgOff) – 1 June 1943
- T.J. Ling (PltOff) – 15 December 1943
- W.H.C. Mann (PltOff) – 26 December 1943
- K.S. While (PltOff) – 30 June 1944
- E.G. McCulloch (PltOff) – 9 October 1944
- E.W. Lee-Steere (SectOff) – 31 January 1945
