= Littoral Manoeuvre Group =

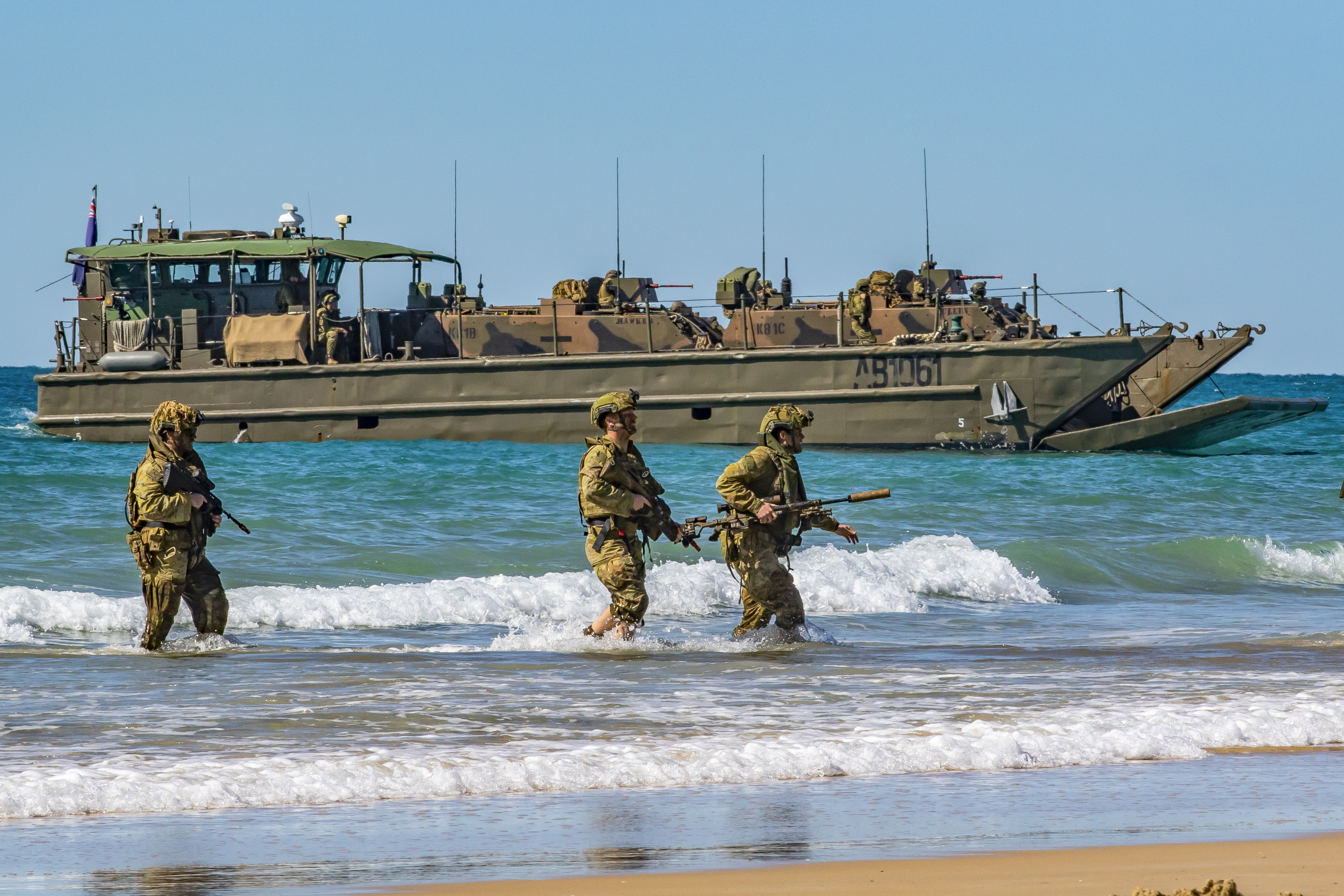
- Soldiers from the 2nd Battalion, Royal Australian Regiment and an Australian Army LCM-8 landing craft in 2019
- Active: 2026 - current
- Branch: Australian Army
- Role: Amphibious warfare Littoral warfare
- Part of: 17th Sustainment Brigade
- Garrison/HQ: Gallipoli Barracks
- Motto: 'Soldiers from the sea'

The Littoral Manoeuvre Group is an Australian Army formation responsible for transporting forces across coastal and island regions.

== History ==
The Littoral Manoeuvre Group was formally established as an element of the 17th Sustainment Brigade on 30 March 2026. It will be responsible for operating a new force of watercraft that have been ordered for the Army. This is a new capability for the Army, with it having only operated small landing craft since its larger craft were transferred to the Royal Australian Navy 50 years previously. The group's headquarters is located at Gallipoli Barracks in Brisbane.

The Department of Defence described the group's role as "to move, deploy and support land forces across coastal and island regions".

== Structure ==
On formation, the Littoral Manoeuvre Group comprised its headquarters, the 1st Landing Craft Battalion and the 35th Water Transport Squadron and Littoral Riverine Survey Squadron. The later two units were pre-existing, and were transferred from the 10th Force Support Battalion. The 1st Landing Craft Battalion will be based in Brisbane. Two more landing craft battalions are scheduled to be raised: 2nd Landing Craft Battalion in North Queensland and 3rd Landing Craft Battalion in Darwin, Northern Territory. Each battalion will operate four landing craft medium and two landing craft heavy with both types to begin construction in 2026.
