= No. 325 Expeditionary Combat Support Squadron RAAF =

No. 325 Expeditionary Combat Support Squadron
- Active: 2008– 1 July 2010
- Disbanded: 1 July 2010
- Country: Australia
- Branch: Royal Australian Air Force
- Role: Combat support
- Part of: No. 396 Expeditionary Combat Support Wing
- Base: RAAF Base Richmond

No. 325 Expeditionary Combat Support Squadron (325ECSS) was a Royal Australian Air Force (RAAF) ground support squadron. It was formed on 30 September 2008 by combining Combat Support Unit Richmond and Combat Support Unit Glenbrook. The two units were combined as part of reforms which aim to improve the efficiency of the RAAF's airbase services and improve the force's expeditionary support capability. 325ECSS provides support services at RAAF Base Richmond and RAAF Base Glenbrook with a contingency role of providing personnel for the Northern Expeditionary Combat Support Squadron.

On 1 July 2010 changes to the structure of the Combat Support Group resulted in the functions of 325ECSS being integrated with No. 22 (City of Sydney) Squadron at RAAF Richmond and 321ECSS being disbanded.
