= Royal Australian Army Service Corps =

Australian army corps from 1903 to 1973

The Royal Australian Army Service Corps (RAASC) was a corps within the Australian Army. Formed on 1 July 1903, in the aftermath of the Federation of Australia, it was initially known as the Australian Army Service Corps (AASC) and subsumed the functions that had been undertaken by various organisations within the colonial forces. In 1948, the Royal prefix was bestowed upon the corps. The corps served in World War I, World War II, as part of the British Commonwealth Occupation Force in Japan, Korean War, Malayan Emergency and the Vietnam War. The RAASC was disbanded on 31 May 1973.

After the disbanding of the corps, responsibilities for transport, air dispatch and postal functions were assigned to the newly formed Royal Australian Corps of Transport (RACT) and responsibilities for foodstuffs and petroleum, oil and lubricants (POL) were assigned to the Royal Australian Army Ordnance Corps (RAAOC).

== Bibliography ==
- Dennis, Peter; Grey, Jeffrey; Morris, Ewan; Prior, Robin (1995). The Oxford Companion to Australian Military History. Melbourne: Oxford University Press. ISBN 0-19-553227-9.
- McKenzie-Smith, Graham (2015). "The Army's Grocers and Truckies: Understanding the Australian Army Service Corps in WW2". Sabretache. LVI (1, March). Military Historical Society of Australia: 16–22. ISSN 0048-8933.
