= Air Combat Group RAAF =

Force element group of the Royal Australian Air Force

Air Combat Group
- Active: 7 February 2002 – present
- Branch: RAAF
- Part of: Air Command
- Garrison/HQ: RAAF Base Williamtown
- Mottos: Defend and Strike

Commanders
- Current commander: Air Commodore Mike Kitcher

Insignia
- Callsign: PHANTOM

The Royal Australian Air Force's Air Combat Group (ACG) is the force element group with general responsibility for the RAAF's strike fighters and electronic attack aircraft. ACG was formed on 7 February 2002 through an amalgamation of the RAAF's Tactical Fighter Group and Strike Reconnaissance Group in an effort to improve the speed with which the RAAF can deploy its combat aircraft.

As of October 2022 the commander of ACG is Air Commodore Tim Alsop.

Since the Group's formation, ACG aircraft have deployed to Diego Garcia during Operation Slipper and formed part of the Australian contribution to the 2003 invasion of Iraq. ACG also worked on Operation Guardian II, which was the protection of the Commonwealth Heads of Government Meeting 2002, and on Operation Falconer, which was providing a larger ground crew and strike force in Iraq. Other tasks have included support for Operation Acolyte (Melbourne Commonwealth Games 2006) and participation in exercises such as Exercise Pitch Black in Australia and Exercise Red Flag in the United States. Aircraft from the Group have also performed domestic security tasks and participated in overseas exercises.

It comprises No. 78, No. 81 and No. 82 Wings. No. 78 Wing RAAF is headquartered at RAAF Williamtown. It commands No. 76 Squadron, based at RAAF Williamtown, No. 79 Squadron, based at RAAF Pearce, No. 2 Operational Conversion Unit, based at RAAF Williamtown, and No. 278 Squadron, which provides technical training specific to flight training. No. 81 Wing RAAF is headquartered at RAAF Williamtown. It commands No. 3 Squadron, based at RAAF Williamtown, No. 75 Squadron, based at RAAF Tindal, and No. 77 Squadron, based at RAAF Williamtown. No. 82 Wing RAAF is headquartered at RAAF Amberley. It commands No. 1 Squadron, based at RAAF Amberley, No. 6 Squadron, based at RAAF Amberley, and the Forward Air Control Development Unit (FACDU), based at RAAF Williamtown.

It is accountable for all of the Air Force's fighter and jet trainer squadrons, as well as the PC-21 forward air control aircraft. The ACG is equipped with Boeing F/A-18F Super Hornet fighters, EA-18G Growler electronic attack aircraft, BAE Hawk trainers and Pilatus PC-21 forward air control training aircraft.

== Establishment and purpose ==
The Air Combat Group (ACG) was created on 1 January 2002 with the merging of two Force Element Groups (FEGs), Strike Reconnaissance Group (F-111) and Tactical Fighter Group (F/A-18 Hornet, Hawk and PC-9A). The ACG was tasked to deliver the core capabilities of Control of the Air and Precision Air Strike with the hope that it would allow the RAAF to more quickly deploy its combat aircraft. Although the fighter and strike elements will continue to operate as discrete units for some time, ACG will provide the opportunity for the RAAF to test the organisation required to deliver a range of combat capabilities.

== Responsibilities and bases ==
Air Combat Group is one of the Force Element Groups (FEGs) in the Air Force. It has 145 aircraft, 163 aircrew and 2000 support personnel based across Australia. It is accountable for all of the Air Force's F/A-18 Hornet, Super Hornet and Hawk squadrons, as well as the PC-9A Forward Air Control aircraft.

The Wings under the Air Combat Group are located at RAAF Base Amberley, near Brisbane, Queensland, RAAF Base Williamtown, near Newcastle, New South Wales, RAAF Base Pearce, near Perth, Western Australia, and RAAF Base Tindal, near Katherine, Northern Territory. The Headquarters is located at RAAF Williamtown, NSW 2314.

== Training and operational history ==
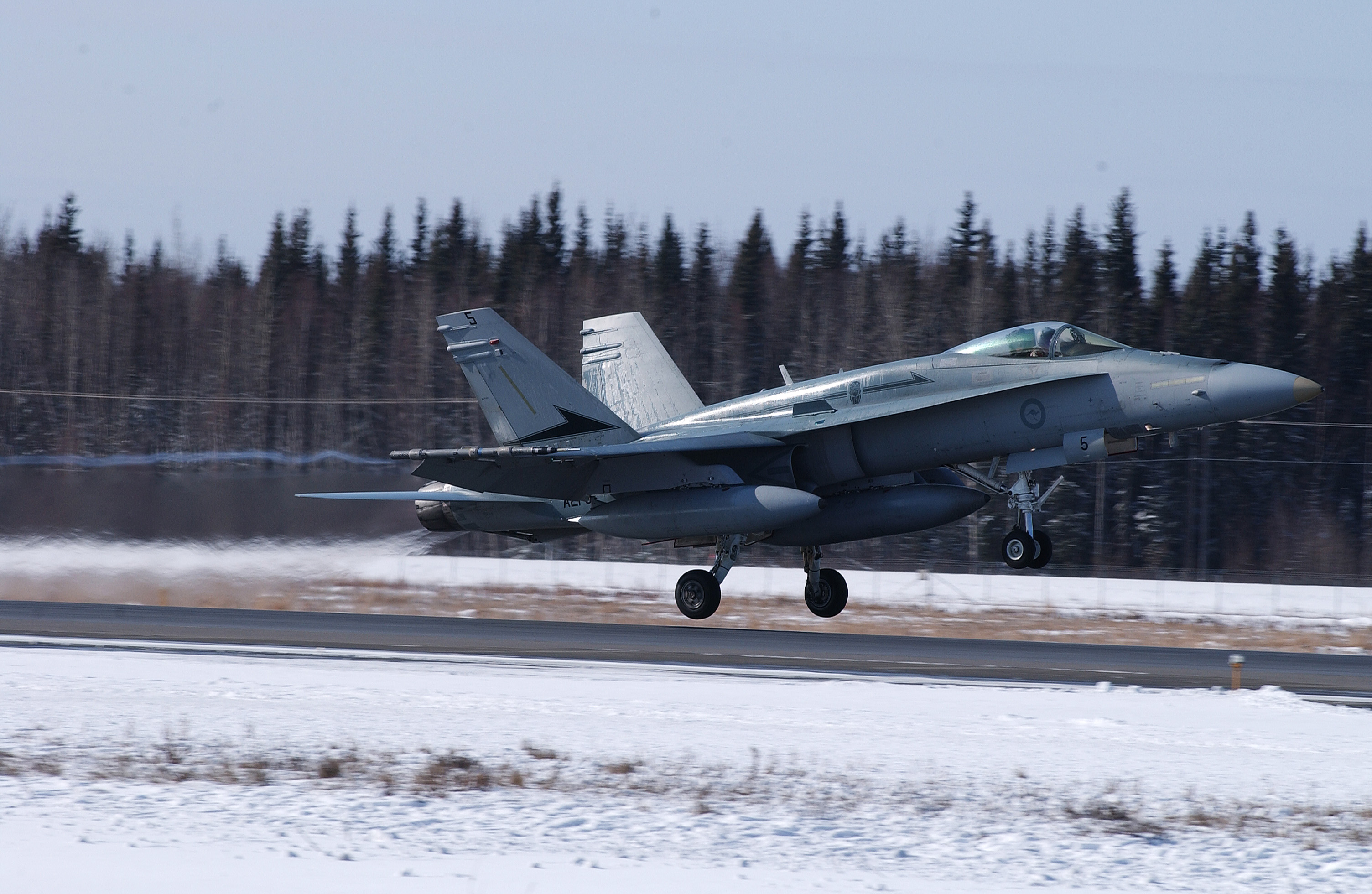
A No. 75 Squadron F/A-18 Hornet during the squadron's deployment to Red Flag – Alaska in early 2008

Air Combat Group maintains a busy training schedule for the air and ground crew on the F/A-18 Hornet, Super Hornet and Hawk. The Group's tasks have included support for Operation Acolyte (Melbourne Commonwealth Games 2006) and participation in exercises such as Exercise Pitch Black in Australia and Exercise Red Flag in the United States.

=== Operation Slipper ===
A detachment of four Australian F/A-18 Hornet fighter aircraft provided air defence for the US military base on the island of Diego Garcia during the campaign against the Taliban, which was called Operation Slipper. The initial detachment was provided by No. 77 Squadron RAAF between December 2001 and 10 February 2002. This detachment was replaced by a detachment from No. 3 Squadron RAAF which was deployed between 10 February 2002 and 20 May 2002. No further Australian units have been deployed to Diego Garcia. The United States Air Force commented favourably on the RAAF contingent's professionalism during this deployment.

=== Operation Guardian II ===
During Operation Guardian II a squadron was deployed to protect the March 2002 Commonwealth Heads of Government Meeting (CHOGM) in south-east Queensland. During this, the Australian Defence Force pilots were given permission to destroy any hostile aircraft. This has not happened at any time during Australian peacetime, but was deemed necessary because of the 11 September 2001 attacks six months earlier.

=== Operation Falconer ===
No. 75 Squadron deployed to Al Udeid Air Base in Qatar in February 2003 as part of the Australian contribution to the invasion of Iraq (Operation Falconer). The squadron was equipped only with recently serviced F/A-18s, and its 14 aircraft were drawn from No. 81 Wing's three frontline squadrons. The other squadrons also provided pilots to bolster aircrew numbers in No. 75 Squadron to 25. The squadron saw action during the Iraq War and provided air defence for high-value assets such as Airborne Early Warning and Control Aircraft, close air support for ground troops and attacked other Iraqi targets. No. 75 Squadron flew 350 combat missions during the war and dropped 122 laser-guided bombs. The squadron was prohibited from operating near Baghdad as the Hornets' electronic warfare suite was judged to not be sufficient for such heavily defended air space. The squadron's rules of engagement also banned it from conducting close air support in urban areas. No. 75 Squadron conducted its final combat mission on 27 April and all 14 aircraft returned to RAAF Base Tindal on 14 May 2003.

== Structure ==
Headquarters Air Combat Group is located at RAAF Williamtown, with elements based at Amberley (Queensland), Tindal (Northern Territory), Pearce (Western Australia) and Williamtown (New South Wales). One hundred and forty-five aircraft, 163 aircrew, and around 2000 personnel make up the ACG.

=== Commander ===
The current commander of Air Combat Group is Air Commodore Mike Kitcher, who assumed the post in July 2017.

=== Air Combat Group components ===
==== 78 Wing ====
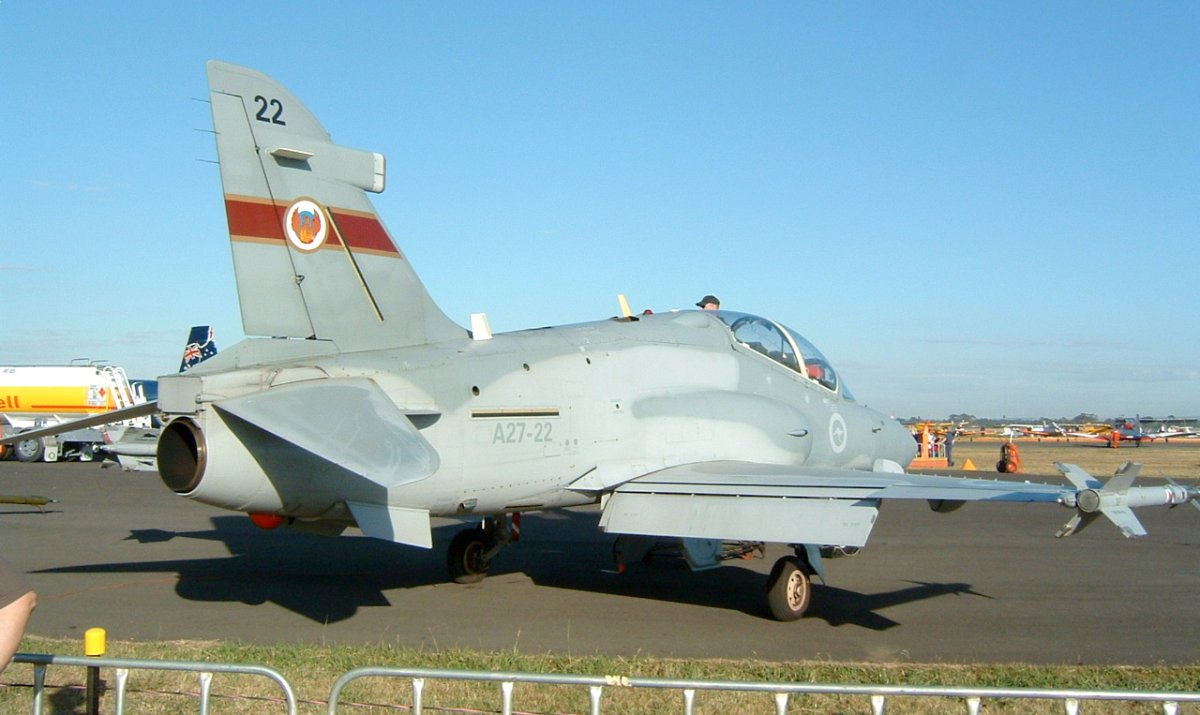
A No. 79 Squadron Hawk 127

No. 78 Wing RAAF is headquartered at RAAF Williamtown. It commands No. 76 Squadron, based at RAAF Williamtown, flying Hawk Mk127 aircraft, No. 79 Squadron, based at RAAF Pearce, flying Hawk Mk127 aircraft, and No. 278 Squadron, which provides technical training specific to flight training. 78 Wing conducts operational training, both ground and air, on the Hawk Mk 127 at Nos. 76 and 79 Squadrons. It currently has an increasing role providing simulator training to aircrews and maintenance personnel at Air Force bases across Australia.

==== 81 Wing ====
No. 81 Wing RAAF is headquartered at RAAF Williamtown. It commands No. 2 Operational Conversion Unit, based at RAAF Williamtown, No. 3 Squadron, based at RAAF Williamtown, No. 75 Squadron, based at RAAF Base Tindal, and No. 77 Squadron, based at RAAF Williamtown, flying F-35A aircraft. 81 Wing is responsible for the provision of combat air power to Australian and coalition forces through Offensive Counter Air (OCA) and Defensive Counter Air (DCA) operations using three squadrons of Lockheed Martin F-35 Lightning II, Nos. 3, 75 and 77 Squadrons.

==== 82 Wing ====
No. 82 Wing RAAF is headquartered at RAAF Amberley. It commands No. 1 Squadron and No. 6 Squadron, based at RAAF Base Amberley, flying F/A-18F Super Hornet aircraft and the Boeing EA-18G Growler. No. 6 Squadron specialises in Electronic Warfare. No. 82 Wing strikes designated targets and conducts reconnaissance with Nos. 1 and 6 Squadrons. It also commands No. 4 Squadron composed of the air force special forces Combat Controllers, aircrew who operate the Pilatus PC-21 aircraft and instructors for the Australian Defence Force Joint Terminal Attack Controller (JTAC) course.

== Aircraft ==
The ACG is equipped with Lockheed Martin F-35 Lightning II, and F/A-18F Super Hornet fighter and attack aircraft, Boeing EA-18G Growler Electronic Warfare aircraft, PC-21 (Forward Air Control) and BAE Hawk trainers. Each of these aircraft has a different role. The F-35 replaced the McDonnell Douglas F/A-18 Hornet in Australian service. The F/A-18 was retired from RAAF service in late 2021.

=== Fighter and Electronic Warfare aircraft ===
The Australian Government replaced the F/A-18A and B with the F-35A Lightning II, starting in 2017 and with the expected final aircraft of the 72 ordered arriving in 2023. The F/A-18F Super Hornet is a dedicated strike aircraft in RAAF service and are considered superior to the F-22 Raptor in their ability to acquire and track moving ground targets. The RAAF's No. 6 squadron based at RAAF Amberley operates Boeing EA-18G Growler Electronic warfare aircraft.

=== Training aircraft ===
The BAE Systems Hawk Mk127, is a British advanced jet trainer which first flew in 1974 as the Hawker Siddeley Hawk. ACG operations 33 Hawks as trainers, and these aircraft have a limited air-to-air and land strike capability. The Pilatus PC-21 Forward Air Control (FAC) is a variant of the Pilatus PC-21 used by the RAAF as advanced pilot training aircraft.
