= Australian Army Transportation Corps =

- Active: 1945–47
- Country: Australia
- Branch: Army
- Role: Water transport, terminal operations, road and rail transport

Insignia
- Abbreviation: AATC

The Australian Army Transportation Corps (AATC) was a corps of the Australian Army that was responsible for various transportation functions including rail, water and terminal/dock operations. Formed in the final days of World War II, the corps had only a very short existence, lasting until mid-1947 when its functions were subsumed by the Royal Australian Engineers again. This situation would remain until the early 1970s when the Royal Australian Corps of Transport was formed.

== History ==
The corps was formed on 6 August 1945 following the merger of three directorates – Water Transport, Road and Rail Transport, and Docks – which had previously existed as part of the Royal Australian Engineers Transportation Service (RAE—TN). The AATC's existence was only short lived, though, as it was disbanded on 7 April 1947, when the Department of Transportation was created within the RAE, assuming control of movements, water transport and terminal operations. These functions would remain within the RAE's remit until 1973 when the Royal Australian Corps of Transport was formed.
