= 9th Force Support Battalion (Australia) =

Logistics unit of the Australian Army

- Active: 1998 – present
- Country: Australia
- Branch: Army
- Type: Logistics
- Size: One battalion
- Part of: 17th Sustainment Brigade
- Garrison/HQ: RAAF Base Amberley, Amberley

Insignia
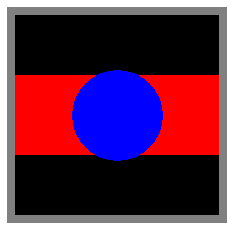
- Unit colour patch

The 9th Force Support Battalion (9 FSB) is an Australian Army logistics battalion. Formed on 1 August 1998, following the amalgamation of a number of air despatch, military police, ships army detachments, personnel and transport units, it is based at RAAF Base Amberley in Amberley. 9 FSB is part the 17th Sustainment Brigade. Its role is to provide third line or 'general' support within an area of operations.

9 FSB keeps two camels in their depot at RAAF Base Amberley as the mascots for 26th Transport Squadron, named "Vernon" and "Penny". Vernon and Penny have 2 handlers caring for them at all times. Their names come from the Officer Commanding of 9 FSB and his wife in 1984-85.

On 30 May 2011, Lance Corporal Andrew Jones, a cook from 9 FSB, was killed in action in Afghanistan while serving with the Force Support Unit in Uruzgan Province.

The battalion consists of the following units:

- 9th Theatre Maintenance Company
- 26th Transport Squadron
- 37th Combat Supply Company
- 176th Air Dispatch Squadron (RAAF Base Richmond)
