= Strike Reconnaissance Group RAAF =

Strike Reconnaissance Group
- Active: 1987–2001
- Branch: RAAF
- Garrison/HQ: RAAF Amberley, Queensland
- Motto: Strength with Vision

The Strike Reconnaissance Group was a Royal Australian Air Force group responsible for operating the RAAF's General Dynamics F-111 Aardvark aircraft. On 1 January 2002 it was combined with Tactical Fighter Group to form Air Combat Group.

Prior to 1987 the F-111C squadrons appeared to report to the RAAF Amberley base commander.

The group supervised No. 82 Wing and its squadrons, No. 1 Squadron RAAF and No. 6 Squadron RAAF. The F-111C was the first operational aircraft in the world to be able to use the full range of capabilities of the AGM-84 Harpoon (AGM-84D Block 1C). Capable of supersonic speed at sea level, the F-111C could carry up to four Harpoon missiles for some strike radii. It had a combat radius of about 1,000 miles.
