= 17th Sustainment Brigade (Australia) =

Logistics formation of the Australian Army

- Active: 2006–present
- Country: Australia
- Branch: Army
- Type: Logistics
- Size: 2,650 (active); 1,350 (reserve)
- Part of: 1st Division
- Garrison/HQ: Sydney
- Engagements: 2021 Solomon Islands unrest

The 17th Sustainment Brigade (17 Sust Brigade) currently commands the Australian Army's deployable operational level logistics units. Raised on 20 May 2006, the brigade was formerly known as the Logistic Support Force (LSF), and is made up of varied logistic corps and trades. It encompasses both reserve and full-time units, geographically dispersed throughout Australia. Headquartered in Sydney its primary deployable command element is the Force Sustainment Group. The units of the brigade are responsible for providing third line or 'general' support within an area of operations. The brigade was designated the 17th Combat Service Support Brigade until 1 August 2019, when it was renamed the 17th Sustainment Brigade. The brigade traces its origins back to the 1st Australian Logistic Support Group formed during the Vietnam War.

== Organisation ==
As of 2023 the brigade consists of the following units and sub units:

- Headquarters 17th Sustainment Brigade
- 145th Signals Squadron
- 2nd Force Support Battalion (Reserve)
- 9th Force Support Battalion
- 10th Force Support Battalion

On 2 October 2018, the 1st Military Police Battalion was transferred from 17th Brigade to the 6th Brigade so it is aligned with other theatre-level combat support capabilities that are already under the command of 6th Brigade.

The 1st Psychology Unit was removed from the brigade's order of battle on 19 November 2021, when it was disbanded as part of a restructuring of the Army's health units. In February 2022, four new health battalions were formed following the disbandment of 1st Close Health Battalion, 2nd General Health Battalion and 3rd Health Support Battalion as part of the restructure. The new battalions formed that month were: 1st Health Battalion on 3 February, 2nd Health Battalion on 15 February, 3rd Health Battalion on 22 February and 4th Health Battalion on 17 February. On 3 March 2023, the four new battalions were transferred to the newly formed 2nd Health Brigade.

The 17th Sustainment Brigade was restructured in late 2024. On 15 November the brigade was transferred to the 1st Division. On the 30th of that month the 2nd Force Support Battalion moved to the 2nd Division. On 2 December the brigade gained the 1st Military Police Battalion, 6th Engineer Support Regiment, 12th Chief Engineer Works and 19th Chief Engineer Works from the 6th Brigade.

The Littoral Manoeuvre Group was formally established as a unit within the 17th Sustainment Brigade on 30 March 2026. It includes the 1st Landing Craft Battalion. Two other landing craft battalions are scheduled to be raised.
