= Force Element Group =

Operational capabilities of the Australian Defence Force

Force Element Groups (FEGs) are the operational capabilities of the Australian Defence Force (ADF) as organised into component groups.

Capabilities are formed into Force Elements (FE), which in turn are aggregated into Force Element Groups (FEG). Each capability is assigned a level of operational readiness. The level of capability maintained by an FE or FEG should be consistent with its assigned readiness notice and depends on the availability of trained personnel, the availability of major platforms, combat systems and supplies, and the standard of collective training.

Each of the component commands has a set of FEGs. The FEG operational commanders report to the component commanders (COMAUSFLT/CFC/ACAUST), who in turn report to the operation's Task Force commander. The FEG commanders are either of Captain (naval)/Colonel/Group Captain rank, or one-star rank for larger FEGs (Commodore/Brigadier/Air Commodore). The component commanders are of two-star rank (Rear Admiral/Major General/Air Vice Marshal).

== Maritime FEGs ==
There are two parts to the Royal Australian Navy (RAN)'s structure. One is an operational command, Fleet Command, and the other is a support command, Navy Systems Command. The Navy's assets are administered by seven Force Element Groups (FEGs), which report to the Commander Australian Fleet (COMAUSFLT).

The seven Maritime FEGs are:

- Australian Navy Surface Combatants Force,
- Amphibious Warfare Forces along with the Afloat Support Force,
- Naval Aviation Force, (Fleet Air Arm (FAA) formally: Australian Navy Aviation Group),
- Australian Navy Submarine Force, (Royal Australian Navy Submarine Service),
- Mine Warfare and Clearance Diving Forces,
- Australian Navy Patrol Boat Force and the
- Australian Navy Hydrographic Force (Royal Australian Navy Hydrographic Service).

== Air FEGs ==
Air Command is the operational arm of the Royal Australian Air Force (RAAF). Its role is to manage and command the RAAF's Force Element Groups (FEGs), which contain the operational capability of the Air Force.

Air Command consists of the following FEGs:

- Air Mobility Group
- Air Combat Group
- Surveillance and Response Group
- Combat Support Group
- Air Warfare Centre
- Air Force Training Group

== See also ==
- Structure of the RAAF
- List of Royal Australian Air Force groups
