= RAAF Base Amberley =

Royal Australian Air Force base southwest of Ipswich, Queensland

- Ipswich, Queensland in Australia
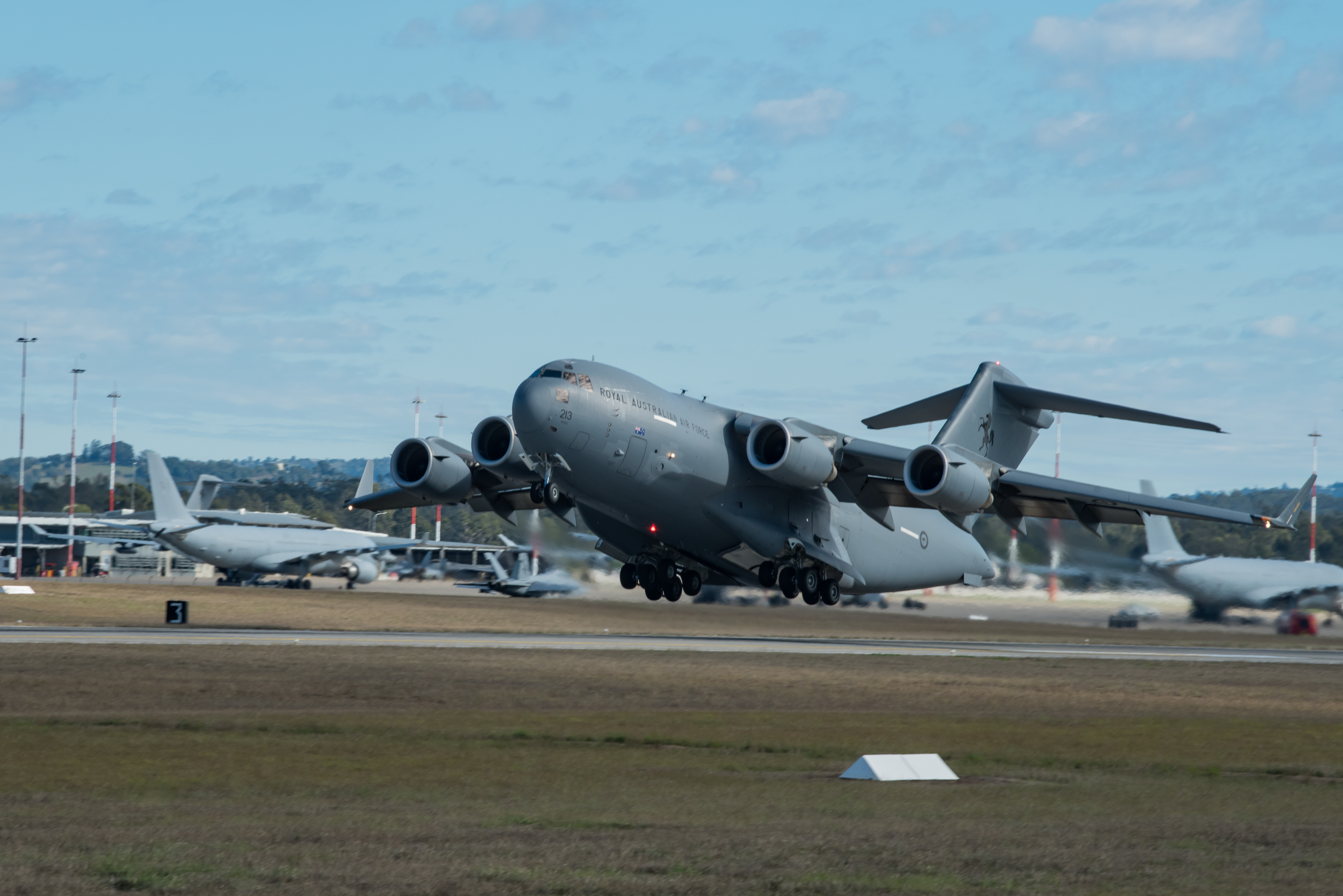
- A RAAF C-17 Globemaster III taking off from RAAF Base Amberley, with KC-30 and F/A-18F aircraft in the background

- Badge

Site information
- Type: Military airbase
- Owner: Department of Defence
- Operator: Royal Australian Air Force

Location
- Location in Queensland
- Coordinates: 27°38′26″S 152°42′43″E
- Area: 1,600 hectares (4,000 acres)

Site history
- Built: June 1940
- In use: June 1940 – present

Garrison information
- Occupants: No. 1 Squadron; No. 6 Squadron, No. 33 Squadron; No. 36 Squadron; 9th Force Support Battalion (Army)

Airfield information
- Identifiers: ICAO: YAMB, WMO: 94568
- Elevation: 28 metres (91 ft) AMSL
Runways
Direction	Length and surface
04/22	1,523 metres (4,997 ft) concrete/asphalt
15/33	3,047 metres (9,997 ft) concrete/asphalt
- Sources: Australian AIP and aerodrome chart

RAAF Base Amberley (ICAO: YAMB) is a Royal Australian Air Force (RAAF) military airbase located 8 km (5.0 mi) southwest of Ipswich in Queensland, Australia and 50 km (31 mi) southwest of the Brisbane CBD. It is the largest military airbase in Australia.

Amberley is one of two defence 'super bases' in Australia, with the other being RAAF Base Edinburgh, and is home to over 5,000 uniformed and civilian personnel. The base is currently home to No. 1 Squadron (operating the F/A-18F Super Hornet), No. 6 Squadron (operating the EA-18G Growler), No. 33 Squadron (operating the Airbus KC-30A MRTT), No. 35 Squadron (operating the C-27J Spartan) and No. 36 Squadron (operating the Boeing C-17A Globemaster III). Amberley is also home to Army units making up the 9th Force Support Battalion (9 FSB).

There are a variety of other formations on the base such as training colleges and maintenance areas. Amberley's largest squadron in terms of personnel is No. 23 (City of Brisbane) Squadron, providing both garrison and deployed combat support. Amberley was one of only two airfields in Australia (the other being Darwin International Airport) that were listed as a Transoceanic Abort (TOA) landing site for the Space Shuttle. Amberley is currently undergoing a A$64 million dollar re-development program.

== History ==
The need for a RAAF base in Brisbane was identified in the 1930s. 882 acres (357 ha) of land c. 8km south-west of the city of Ipswich was gazetted for defence purposes on 12 December 1938. The original land-owners, the Jagera, the Yuggera and Ugarapul clans, called the area Jeebropilly, which denoted the flood plain in the region.

The base was initially planned to house a general-purpose squadron with 300 officers and men. At the outbreak of World War II the handful of brick buildings was still incomplete and many extra buildings were constructed quickly using wood and fibro. The base opened in June 1940 with the first occupants being No. 24 Squadron. From May 1942, the base changed roles from being a centre of flying operations to assembling and repairing aircraft.

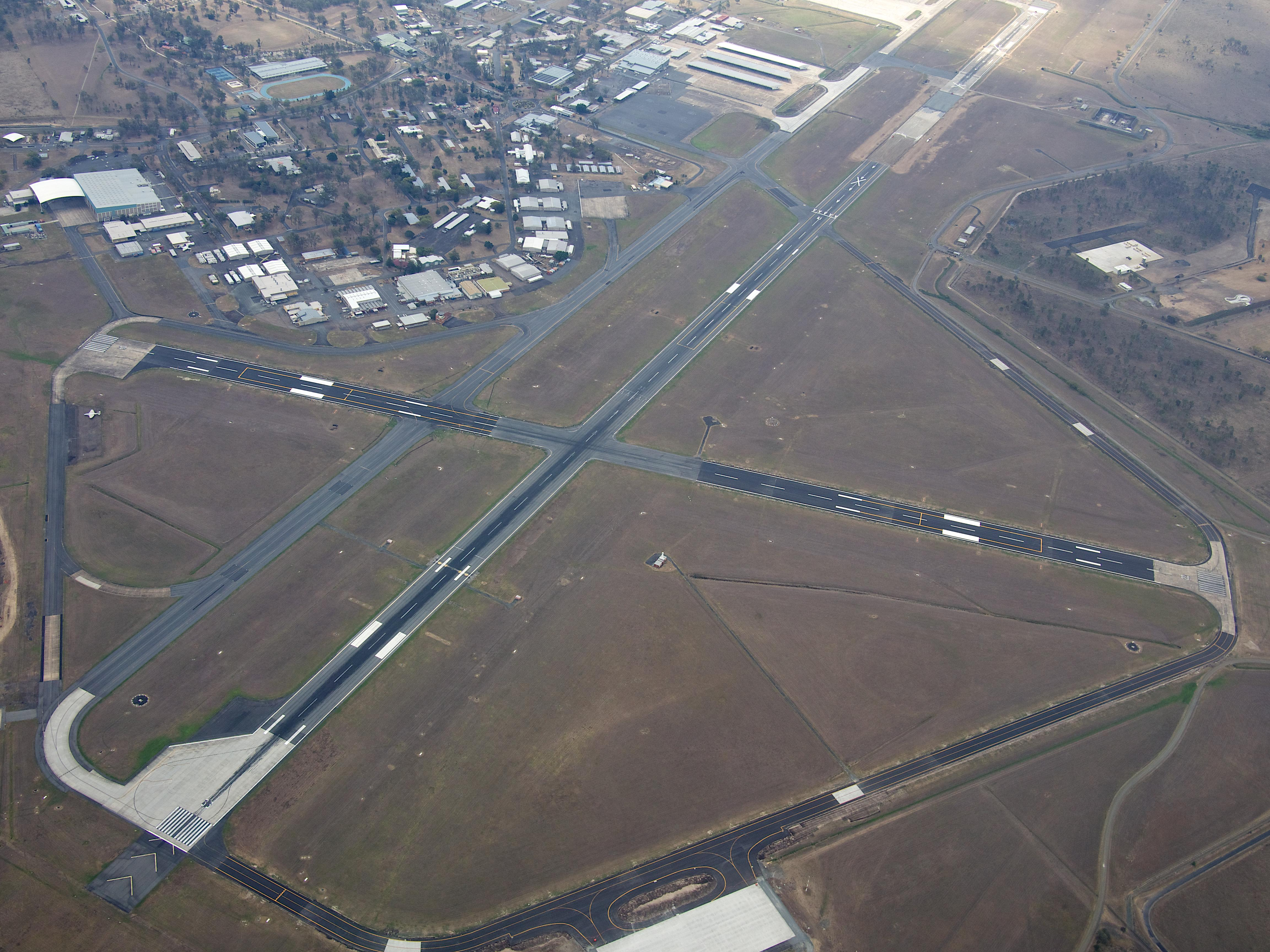
Aerial view of RAAF Base Amberley, 2013

=== First troops airlifted into combat ===
The base was a major United States Army Air Forces base during 1942 and 1943. In September 1942, General Douglas MacArthur and Field Marshal Sir Thomas Blamey, Australian commander of New Guinea Force, decided the key to defending Australia was in New Guinea. The US 32nd Infantry Division had arrived in Australia in April 1942 and spent several weeks building its first camp. When it was transported to a new camp in July, nearly one third of its troops had been in boot camp only five months previously. The division had less than two months of jungle warfare training, which was far short of the year of division-level training required by Army doctrine. Nonetheless, U.S. officers decided it was the most combat-ready unit in Australia.

On 13 September 1942, MacArthur ordered parts of the 32nd Division to Papua New Guinea. Because the situation was critical and time was short, 5th Air Force commander, General George Kenney, suggested that he could transport the first regiment by air. That had never been attempted before, so Company E, 126th IR, was used to test the concept. At dawn on 15 September 1942, the unit was flown 1,293 miles (2,081 km) from Amberley Field to Port Moresby. Beginning on 18 September, the remainder of the 126th IR boarded ships in Brisbane, bound for Port Moresby. On the same day, the 128th IR began the move to Port Moresby from Townsville, Australia. The 126th IR were the first troops to be airlifted into combat.

Known Fifth Air Force units assigned to "Amberley Field" were:

Unit	Aircraft	Assigned	Reassigned	Time at Amberley	Notes
22d Bombardment Group	B-26 Marauder	7 March 1942	7 April 1942	31 days	
38th Bombardment Group, Headquarters	B-25 Mitchell	30 April 1942	10 June 1942	41 days	
69th Bombardment Squadron	B-26 Marauder	30 April 1942	20 May 1942	20 days	
70th Bombardment Squadron	B-26 Marauder	11 May 1942	14 August 1943	1 year, 95 days	
475th Fighter Group, Headquarters	P-38 Lightning	14 May 1942	14 August 1943	1 year, 92 days	
431st Fighter Squadron	P-38 Lightning	1 July 1943	14 August 1943	44 days	
432d Fighter Squadron	P-38 Lightning	11 June 1943	14 August 1943	64 days	
433d Fighter Squadron	P-38 Lightning	17 June 1943	14 August 1943	58 days	

The US transferred the facility to Australia in 1947, and it became the base for the RAAF's heavy bombers, operated by No. 1, No. 2 and No. 6 squadrons. The reserve No. 23 (City of Brisbane) Squadron relocated from RAAF Station Archerfield to Amberley in 1955.

In 1965, the US extended a "Joint Research Program for Measuring the Physical Effects of Disturbances in the Atmosphere or in Space with particular emphasis on their effect on Radio Communications" from RAAF Base Pearce to the base at Amberley.

== Current layout ==
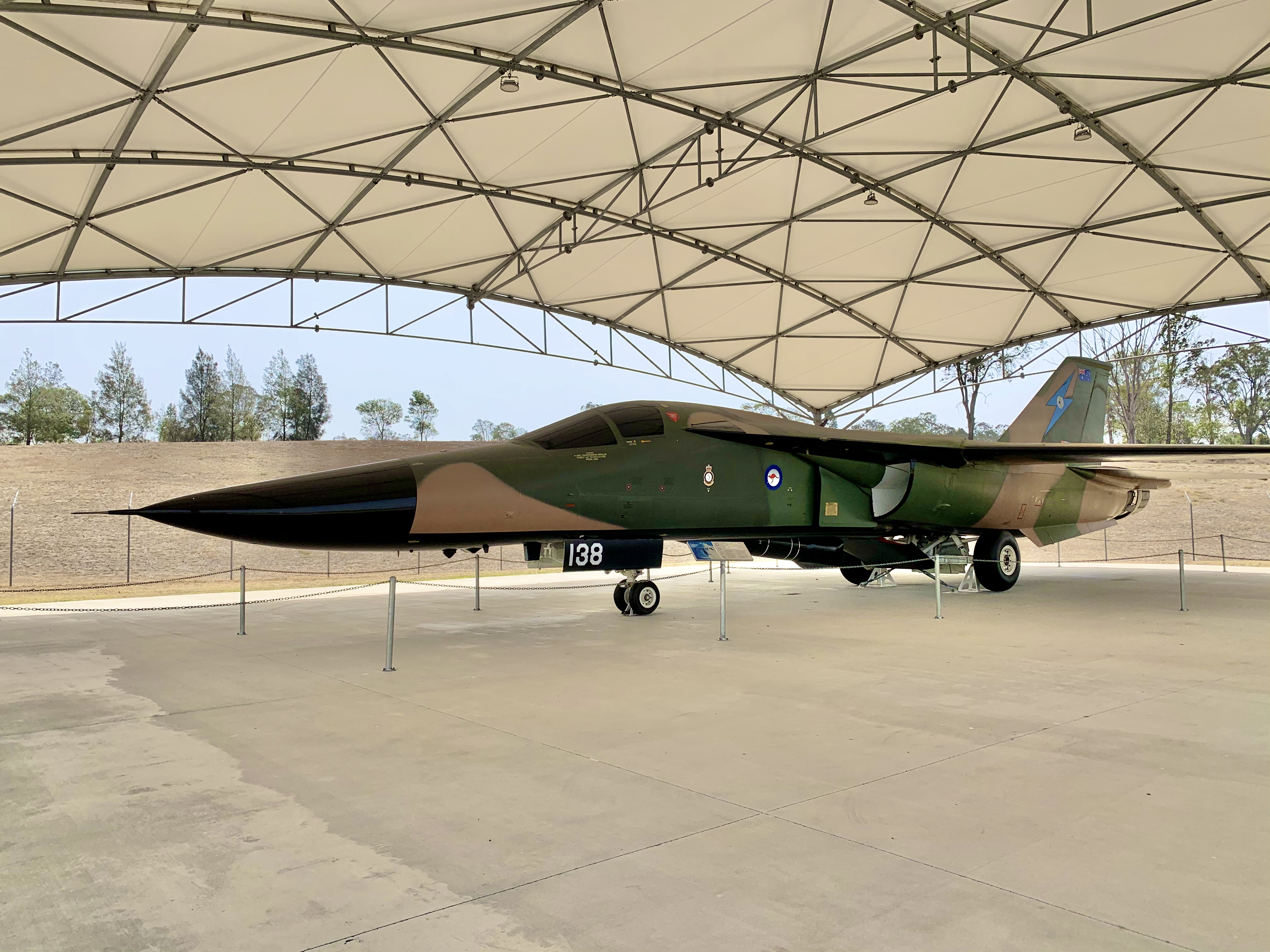
Retired RAAF F-111 now serving as a gate guardian at RAAF Base Amberley

The current layout of the aerodrome consists of two runways, 3km and 1.5km long.

== Current units ==
The following units are based at RAAF Base Amberley:

Royal Australian Air Force
Unit	Full name	Force Element Group	Aircraft	Notes
HQ82WG	Headquarters No. 82 Wing	Air Combat Group		
	Headquarters No. 95 Wing			
1SQN	No. 1 Squadron	Air Combat Group	F/A-18F Super Hornet	
6SQN	No. 6 Squadron	Air Combat Group	EA-18G Growler	
33SQN	No. 33 Squadron	Air Mobility Group	KC-30A MRTT	
35SQN	No. 35 Squadron	Air Mobility Group	C-27J Spartan	
36SQN	No. 36 Squadron	Air Mobility Group	C-17A Globemaster III	
452SQN AMB FLT	No. 452 Squadron Amberley Flight	Surveillance and Response Group		
HQCSG	Headquarters Combat Support Group	Combat Support Group		
HQ 95WG	Headquarters No. 95 Wing	Combat Support Group		
295SQN	No 295 Squadron (Training and Standards)	Combat Support Group		
1CCS DET AMB	No. 1 Combat Communications Squadron Detachment Amberley	Combat Support Group		
2 SECFOR	Headquarters No. 2 Security Forces Squadron	Combat Support Group		
HQ 96WG	Headquarters No. 96 Wing	Combat Support Group		
23SQN	No. 23 (City of Brisbane) Squadron	Combat Support Group		
HQHSW	Headquarters Health Services Wing	Combat Support Group		
1EHS	Headquarters No. 1 Expeditionary Health Squadron	Combat Support Group		
3AMES DET AMB	No 3 Aero-medical Evacuation Squadron Detachment Amberley	Combat Support Group		
HOCU	Health Operational Conversion Unit	Combat Support Group		
RAAFSFS	RAAF Security and Fire School	Air Force Training Group		
HALSPO	Heavy Air Lift Systems Program Office	Defence Materiel Organisation		
SRSPO	Strike Reconnaissance Systems Program Office	Defence Materiel Organisation		
ARDU	Aircraft Research and Development Unit Detachment Amberley	Aerospace Operational Support Group		
Australian Army
6 ESR	6th Engineer Support Regiment (except 20 EOD Sqn)	6th Brigade		
9 FSB	9th Force Support Battalion (except 176 AD Sqn)	17th Sustainment Brigade		

== See also ==
- United States Army Air Forces in Australia (World War II)
- List of airports in Queensland
- List of Royal Australian Air Force installations
