= INTERFET logistics =

Logistical support of the International Force East Timor

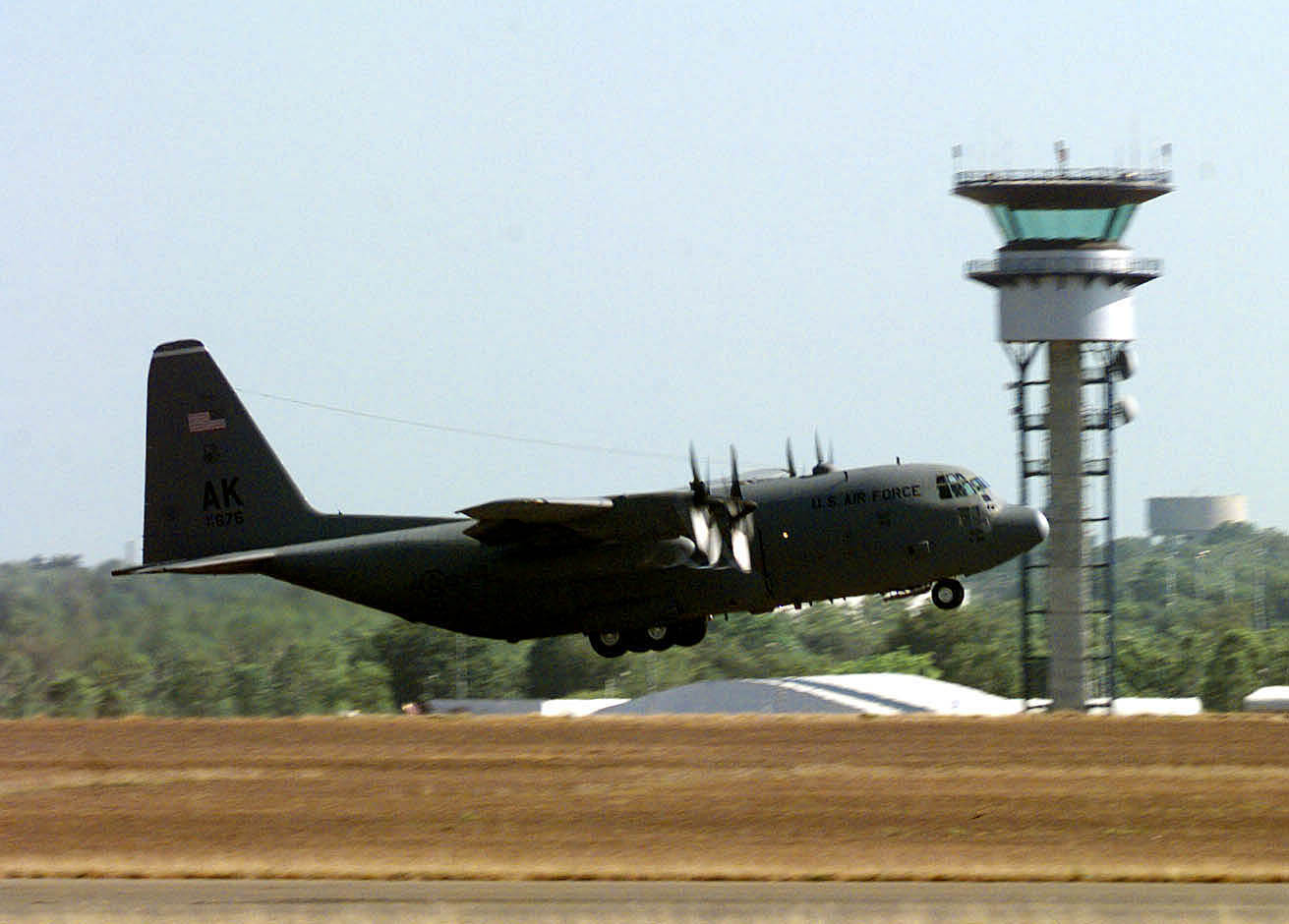
USAF C-130H taking off from RAAF Base Darwin for a mission to East Timor

The logistical support of the multinational International Force East Timor (INTERFET) peacekeeping mission in 1999 and 2000 involved, at its peak, 11,693 personnel from 23 countries. Of these 5,697 were from Australia, making it the largest deployment of Australian forces overseas since the Vietnam War. INTERFET was unusual in that it was led by Australia, casting the country in a wholly unfamiliar role. The logistics and support areas of the Australian Defence Force (ADF) had been subject to deep cuts in the 1990s. The ADF had not anticipated being committed to such a large peacekeeping mission, and was unprepared to support an Australian force projection of this size, much less act as lead nation of an international coalition.

INTERFET deployed to East Timor in September 1999. Over 90 per cent of the cargo and most of the passengers travelled by sea, transported by a naval task force. Eleven nations contributed transport aircraft to the INTERFET Coalition Airlift Wing (ICAW), which flew 3,400 sorties in support of INTERFET, carried 9,500 tonnes (10,500 short tons) of cargo and transported more than 30,000 passengers. A base was established in Darwin, with supplies, equipment, stores and in many cases personnel stockpiled or staged there before being dispatched to East Timor by sea or air.

East Timor posed significant challenges for logistical support. There was only one deepwater port, the Port of Dili, and it had a maximum quayside depth of just 7 metres (23 ft). There were few beaches suitable for Logistics Over-the-Shore (LOTS) and just three airfields. To give effect to an operational concept that involved flooding East Timor with as many combat troops as possible, troops were initially landed with a minimum of vehicles and supplies. The logistical support units spent October and November catching up and eliminating backlogs. Effective logistical support enabled INTERFET to carry out its mission without severe limitations resulting from inadequate logistics, although there were shortages of spare parts, medical supplies and amenities.

== Background ==
Location of East Timor

The island of Timor, in the Indonesian archipelago, has been populated for up to 40,000 years, occupied by successive waves of immigrants from southern India, Malaysia and Melanesia. It was ruled by small kingdoms that traded spices, slaves and sandalwood with their neighbours. Portugal established a settlement on the eastern part of the island in 1633. Timor was formally divided between the Netherlands and Portugal in 1661, and the first governor of Portuguese Timor was appointed in 1701. For most of the next three centuries, East Timor was a Portuguese colony. During the Second World War, East Timor was occupied by Australian and Dutch forces, and then invaded by the Japanese on 19 February 1942. Sparrow Force, the Australian commandos and Dutch troops on the island, waged a guerrilla campaign until the Australian and Dutch forces were withdrawn in January 1943. The assistance of the East Timorese people in helping the Australians created a bond between Australia and East Timor that became part of popular mythology in Australia. After the war ended, Timor was occupied by Australia, which supported Indonesian independence from the Netherlands, and proposed that East Timor become a United Nations (UN) trusteeship, but backed down in the face of objections from the United Kingdom.

After its April 1974 Carnation Revolution, Portugal initiated a gradual decolonisation process, and East Timor descended into a civil war between supporters of the Timorese Democratic Union (UDT) and Fretilin. In October 1974, Indonesia began military operations to incorporate East Timor. Fretilin unilaterally declared independence on 28 November 1975 in an attempt to forestall this, but on 7 December Indonesian forces invaded East Timor. Indonesia's annexation of East Timor was recognised by Australia and the United States, but not by Portugal or the UN. Most countries regarded it as a "UN-designated non-self-governing territory" under Indonesian control. Following a UN-brokered agreement between Indonesia and Portugal on 5 May 1999, a referendum was held on 30 August 1999 that offered a choice between autonomy within Indonesia and full independence. The people voted overwhelmingly for the latter. A violent scorched earth policy was then carried out by pro-Indonesia militia, supported by elements of the Indonesian National Armed Forces (TNI).

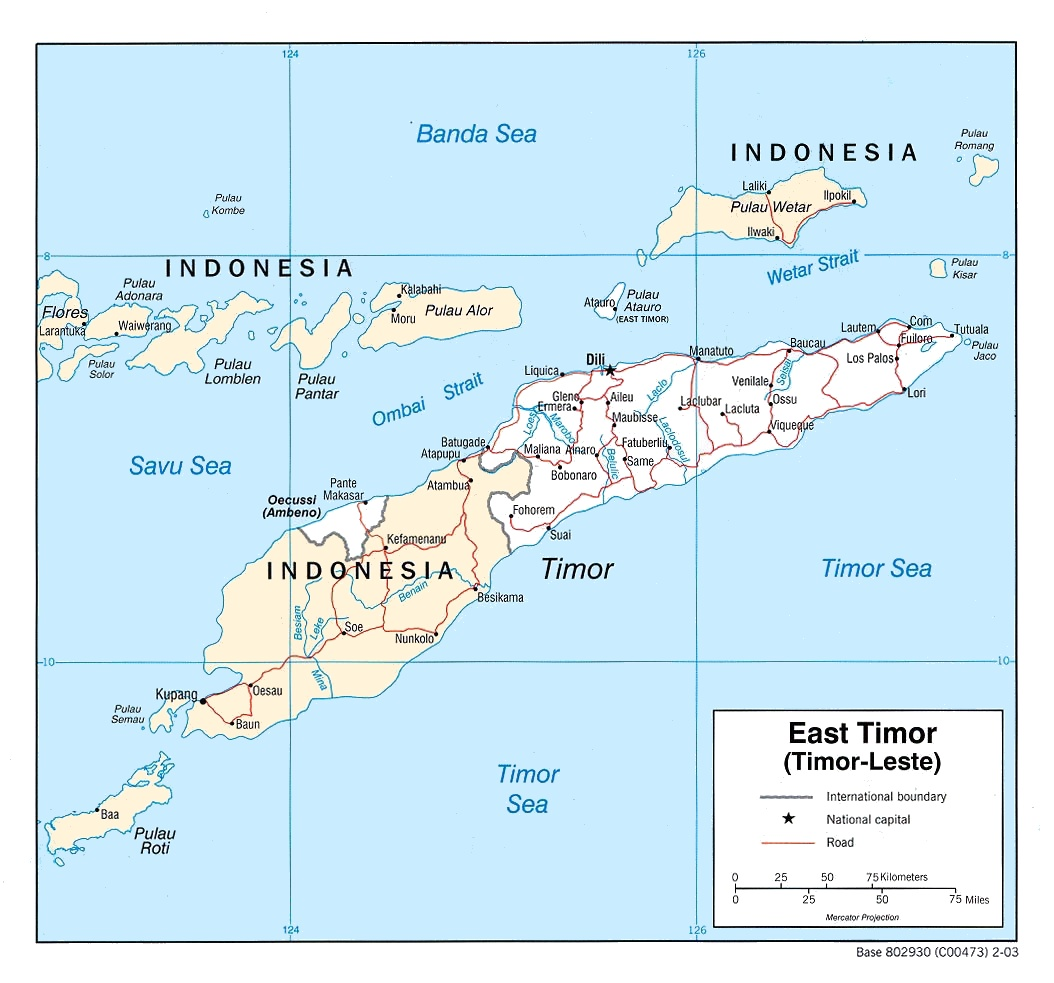
Map of East Timor

The United States declined to intervene in East Timor. There were concerns about the economic and political consequences of a conflict with Indonesia. Americans felt that in the Bosnian War the United States had carried out most of the risky missions and paid the bulk of the bills, and that its allies should do more. The 1999 Helms-Biden Act restricted the United States' ability to provide military support to the UN. On 15 September United Nations Security Council Resolution 1264 established an Australian-led and Indonesian-sanctioned peacekeeping force, INTERFET, to take all necessary measures to restore order in East Timor. The President of the United States, Bill Clinton, offered to "contribute to the force in a limited, but essential, way – including communications and logistical aid, intelligence, air lifts of personnel and material and coordination of the humanitarian response to the tragedy". This meant the United States would play the unfamiliar role of a subordinate member of a military coalition, while Australia played the equally unfamiliar one of lead nation. Neither country's doctrine, based on NATO publications, provided for this contingency.

East Timor posed significant challenges. There was only one deepwater port, the Port of Dili, and it had a maximum quayside depth of just 7 metres (23 ft), greatly limiting its cargo capacity, as the average draught of a 1,000-TEU container ship is about 8.3 metres (27 ft). There were few beaches suitable for Logistics Over-the-Shore (LOTS), and just three airfields. The mountainous interior was characterised by steep, narrow and poorly maintained roads susceptible to being cut by flooding during the wet season. A geographical complication was posed by the Oecussi enclave, which was physically separate from the rest of East Timor. The population was poor, and much infrastructure had been damaged or destroyed, so little host nation support could be provided, and INTERFET had to be entirely self-supporting. The intention was that logistics would remain a national responsibility, each nation being responsible for the logistical support of its own element. In reality, Australia, in its role of lead nation, was called upon to provide all those capabilities not provided by the other members of the coalition. Most of these were in the combat support and combat service support areas.

Dili area

A decade of defence cuts in the 1990s had fallen disproportionately on the logistics and support areas of the Australian Defence Force (ADF), as the leadership attempted to preserve combat capability. This was compounded by a defence policy of the Howard government that sought to maximise the tooth-to-tail ratio. On 11 March 1999, the Minister for Defence, John Moore, announced that administrative cuts had permitted an increase in readiness, so that the Australian Army's Darwin-based 1st Brigade could be brought to 28 days' notice to deploy, the same as the Townsville-based 3rd Brigade. This, he claimed, would allow for a two-brigade deployment to a trouble spot in the Asia-Pacific region at short notice, East Timor being specifically mentioned as a possibility, but the very same cuts rendered this impossible. While they provided short-term financial benefits, far from increasing operational capability, in the words of Lieutenant Colonel David Beaumont "the preferential allocation of resources to combat capabilities and the acceptance of risk in logistics functions brought the Army to the precipice of operational failure."

== Planning ==
=== Australia ===
During July and August 1999, the head of the Australian Army's Strategic Command, Major General Michael Keating, placed elements of the ADF on reduced notice to move. Logistical staffs in Canberra, Sydney and Brisbane were aware of this, but were not authorised to top up units and depots with stocks, purchase necessary special equipment, or pre-position units, vehicles, equipment or supplies. Such actions could be easily discovered, and that might have strained the already tense relations between Australia and Indonesia. Brigadier Mark Evans, the commander of the 3rd Brigade, held a secret meeting of his subordinate commanders at his headquarters in Townsville on 22 August. Lieutenant Colonel Mick Kehoe, the commander of the 10th Force Support Battalion (10 FSB), was not one of Evans's subordinates; his unit was part of Brigadier Jeff Wilkinson's Logistic Support Force, which was based in Sydney. Nonetheless, he attended this and subsequent conferences regarding the deployment to East Timor with Wilkinson's blessing.

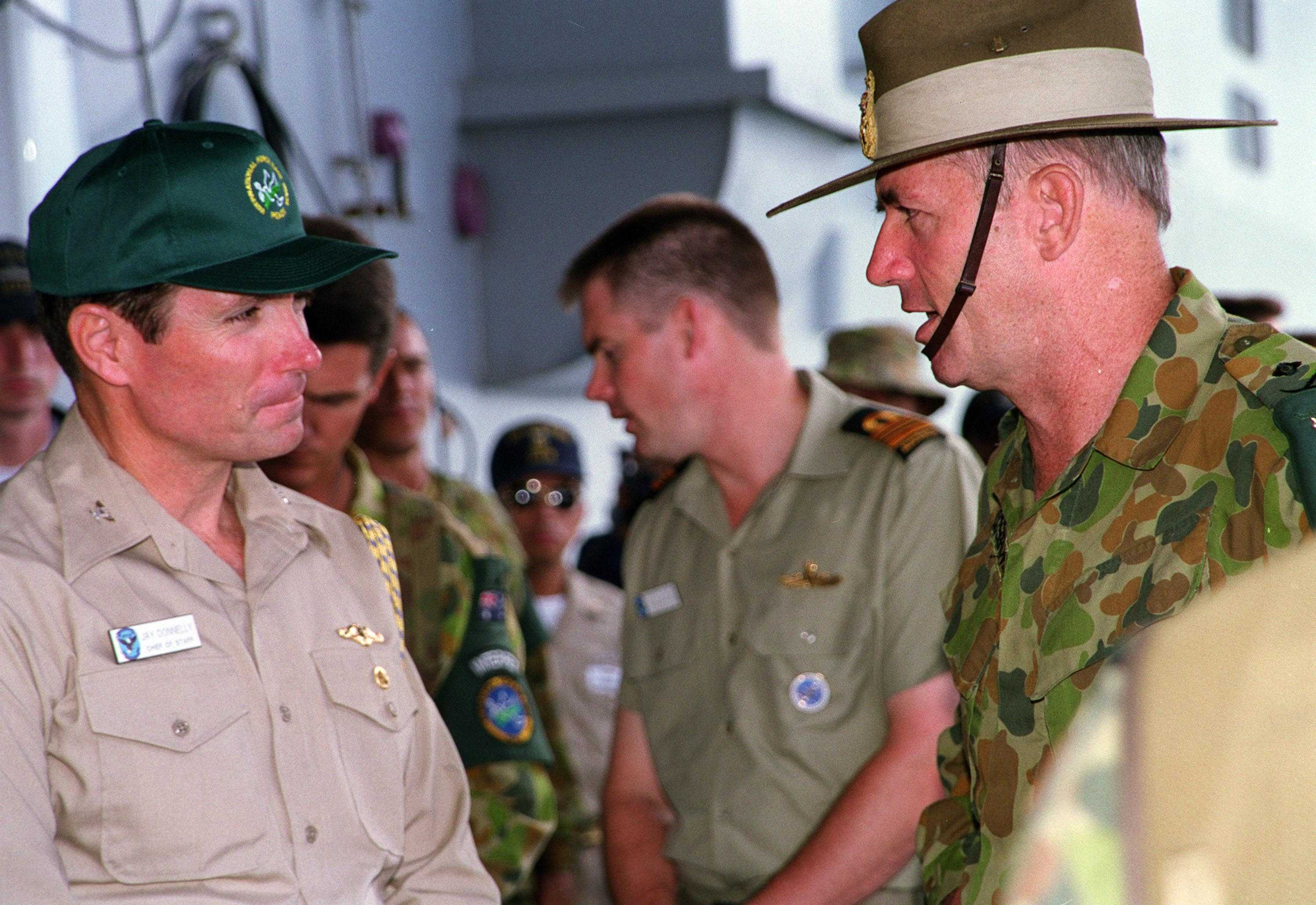
Major General Peter Cosgrove, INTERFET commander (right), after a staff briefing on the USS Blue Ridge in February 2000

Air Vice Marshal Robert Treloar, the Commander Australian Theatre (COMAST), delegated responsibility for developing plans for Operation Spitfire, the evacuation of foreign nationals and selected East Timorese, to Major General Peter Cosgrove's Deployable Joint Force Headquarters (DJFHQ) in Brisbane. Its logistics staff was headed by Lieutenant Colonel Don Cousins. Planning sessions were attended by Wilkinson's senior plans officer, Major Cliff Cole, and Major Jim Evans, who had seen six months' active service with the British Army's logistic headquarters in the Bosnian War, was detached from command of an Australian Army Reserve transport squadron to serve as Wilkinson's liaison officer at DJFHQ.

The Logistic Support Force was not designed to manage the logistic support of forces deployed away from Australia; its mission was to command the Army's field force logistic units, and it was in the midst of a reorganisation in 1999. Wilkinson anticipated being designated the Logistic Component Commander for Operation Spitfire, responsible for coordinating the logistics of all three services, but this did not occur until 26 August, the day before the first troops began deploying to northern Australia for the operation. To support Operation Spitfire, Kehoe detached a small group of specialists under Captain Phil MacMaster to work with Lieutenant Colonel Steve Kinloch's 3rd Brigade Administrative Support Battalion (3 BASB). He later admitted that this was a mistake, costing him the services of key personnel for several weeks.

On 6 September, the day after Operation Spitfire began, Wilkinson received official notice of Operation Warden, the multinational intervention in East Timor. The codename Operation Stabilise was given to operations in and around East Timor, while Operation Warden also included logistic support activities in Australia. At the same time he was relieved of responsibility for logistical support of Crocodile 99, the major joint US-Australian military exercises at the Shoalwater Bay Military Training Area in north Queensland scheduled to commence in October. Operation Spitfire was carried out between 6 and 14 September, during which some 2,500 civilians were evacuated from East Timor to Darwin by air. Planning for Operation Warden commenced on 8 September.

=== New Zealand ===
In New Zealand, the Chief of Defence Force, Air Marshal Carey Adamson, issued a directive on 23 June that initiated preparations for New Zealand participation in East Timor, which was given the codename Operation Castall. A New Zealand Defence Force (NZDF) joint planning group was created, headed by Air Commodore John Hamilton, but, as in Australia, planning was hampered by political sensitivities regarding Indonesia. Adamson decided to order an infantry company, with helicopters and support elements, to be on 28 days' readiness to move. The New Zealand cabinet authorised the funding required to bring 25 M113 armoured personnel carriers (APCs) up to operational readiness. Liaison officers were sent to Australia in August, including one to Australian Theatre in Sydney, where he observed logistical preparations. Colonel Martyn Dunne, a graduate of the Australian Defence College, was chosen to head the forward planning team due to his familiarity with the ADF and operational experience.

It was soon determined that the ADF could provide little assistance with logistics, and in fact was looking to New Zealand for assistance with airlift and sealift, and medical services. A mutual logistics support agreement between the ADF and NZDF was signed in late September. The joint planning group resolved to make the New Zealand force as self-sufficient as possible, and that it would take 60 days' supplies with it. As East Timor had no facilities for handling containers, special container handling cranes were designed and manufactured in New Zealand. The joint planning group calculated that moving a battalion group to Darwin or Dili would require chartering two merchant ships, each of about 7,500 tonnes (7,400 long tons) capacity. Merchant shipping available for charter in New Zealand was scarce but two suitable ships were eventually found. A Boeing 747 freighter was leased to transport high priority cargo to Darwin. In one flight it carried 108.7 tonnes (107.0 long tons) of cargo, including seven four-wheel-drive vehicles. MV Edamgracht, the first of the chartered vessels, departed Wellington on 30 September. It was followed by the MV Edisongracht, which departed on 18 October. The two carried 120 vehicles or pieces of plant, and 1,000 tonnes (980 long tons) of cargo in 100 containers. They arrived at Darwin on 12 and 19 October, where they were unloaded by the same terminal operations platoon that had loaded them.

== Organisation ==
Wilkinson and Cousins agreed that a base at Darwin, 720 kilometres (450 mi) south east of Timor, was required to support Operation Spitfire and subsequent operations. The limitations of Darwin's air and sea ports, its facilities for the storage and distribution of supplies, and its information and communications networks, were not overlooked, but at the same time, due to its isolation, Darwin was more self-supporting, and had better facilities than other cities of similar size. The ADF's long-standing presence in the vicinity had engendered close relationships with the local government and community. On 28 August, Wilkinson appointed Lieutenant Colonel Barry McManus, the commander of the 9th Force Support Battalion (9 FSB), to head the Force Logistic Support Group (FLSG) for Operation Spitfire at Northern Command (NORCOM) Headquarters in Darwin. Commodore Mark Bonser's NORCOM was an operational headquarters that was responsible for the planning and conduct of operations to the north of Australia, and was normally focused on regional surveillance. Brigadier Bruce Osborn, the Army's Director General of Career Management, located suitable ADF officers to fill out the staffs at FLSG and DJFHQ. The outsourcing of "non-core" logistical functions in the ADF had created critical shortages of many essential trades ranging from cooks to port terminal handlers, as many of these jobs were no longer performed by military personnel.

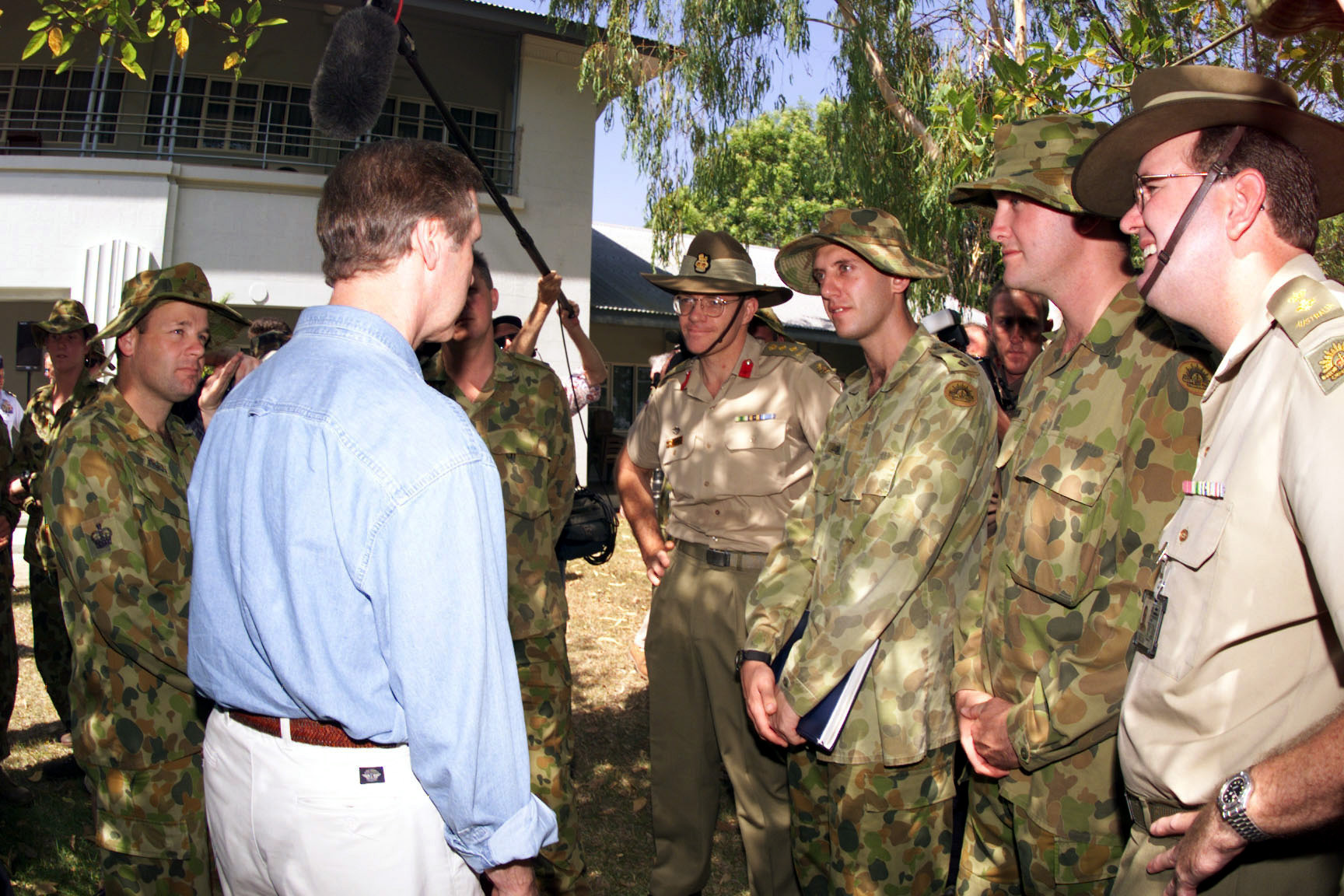
United States Secretary of Defense William Cohen (left) meets members of the Australian Army in Darwin on 29 September 1999.

The Chief of the Defence Force, Admiral Chris Barrie, centralised strategic and operational planning for the projection of forces to East Timor at ADF Headquarters, bypassing the service chiefs in their role as senior environmental advisors. Treloar was appointed the Australian national commander, and Wilkinson became the Logistics Component Commander (LOGCC). Commodore Jim Stapleton was appointed Maritime Component Commander (MCC), and Air Commodore Roxley McLennan became the Air Component Commander (ACC). Stapleton was "dual-hatted"; as MCC (Commander, Task Group 645.1), he was answerable to Cosgrove (Commander, Task Force 645); but as Commodore Flotillas (COMFLOT) (Task Group 627.1), he reported to COMAST's Maritime Commander, Rear Admiral John Lord (Commander, Task Force 627). Brigadier General John G. Castellaw, USMC, the commanding general of the 3rd Marine Expeditionary Brigade, was appointed commander of US forces (USFORINTERFET). The 35-person USFORINTERFET staff arrived in Darwin on 20 September. On 19 September, Barrie announced:

This operation will be Operation Stabilise and is to be commanded by Major General Cosgrove, under my command... Operation Stabilise and Warden together represent the most significant military commitment of the Australian Government, on behalf of the Australian people since World War II. Our logistic support must also be a world-class performance.

The 10th Force Support Battalion had been formed on 1 March 1998 from the amalgamation of the 10th Terminal Regiment, 2nd Field Logistics Battalion, 1st Division Postal Unit and the Defence National Storage and Distribution Centre (DNSDC) Watercraft Base Repair Detachment. It was based in the Townsville area, except for the 36th Water Transport Troop in Darwin. Its sub-units included the 30th/35th Water Transport and Terminal Squadron, 26th Combat Supply Company and 2nd Equipment Company. Along with its main role of providing general (third line) support to operations, the 10th Force Support Battalion had also been charged with providing fourth-line logistic support in northern Queensland. It, therefore, consisted of a mix of deployable and non-deployable components. The 2nd Equipment Company was a non-deployable unit with significant numbers of civilians, and the 26th Combat Supplies Company, which was responsible for classes of supply I (food and potable water), III (petrol, oil and lubricants (POL)) and V (ammunition), also contained many.

No plans had been drawn up to cover a contingency in which the battalion had to deploy overseas. In November 1999, the Chief of Army, Lieutenant General Frank Hickling, announced that the 10th Force Support Battalion would be relieved of its responsibility for northern Queensland from November 2000. In the meantime, it was split in two, the 10th Force Support Battalion (INTERFET) deploying to East Timor and the 10th Force Support Battalion (Rear) remaining in northern Queensland under the command of Major Max Walker, the commander of the 2nd Equipment Company.

The ADF had not anticipated commitment to such a large peacekeeping mission, and borrowed 4,000 flak jackets from US stocks. These were taken from the Defense Supply Center, Columbus, and flown to Darwin via Chicago and Melbourne. Depot stocks of many items were low, due to an over-reliance on just-in-time delivery, a problem that also affected the NZDF. Demonstrating their assessment of the logistical support they expected to receive in East Timor, soldiers preparing to deploy emptied their local supermarket shelves of items such as sun screen, razor blades, toothpaste and hair nets. Each soldier's personnel file was checked to confirm their fitness to deploy. An important concern was the regime for the vaccine for Japanese encephalitis, a disease endemic to East Timor, which required three injections over a four-week period, with a prohibition against air travel for ten days after the last.

== Deployment ==
=== Airlift ===
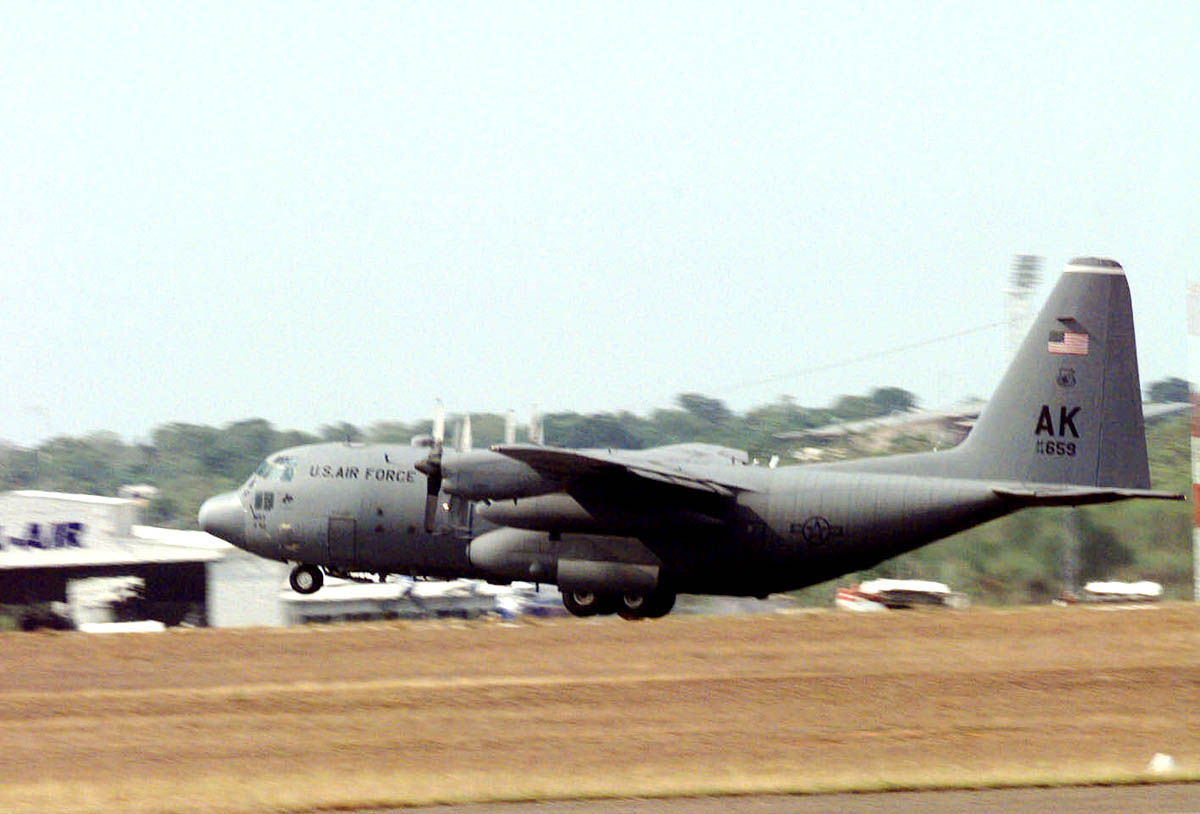
A C-130H aircraft from the US 517th Airlift Squadron takes off from RAAF Base Darwin bound for East Timor.

McLennan had at his disposal 13 Royal Australian Air Force (RAAF) Lockheed C-130H Hercules transport aircraft of No. 86 Wing RAAF Detachment B based at RAAF Base Amberley, RAAF Base Darwin and RAAF Base Tindal, under the command of Squadron Leader Simon Giles. This was augmented by two C-130Hs of the No. 40 Squadron, Royal New Zealand Air Force (RNZAF), with six crews, and a single C-130H with two crews and ten maintenance personnel from the US 517th Airlift Squadron. Normally based at Elmendorf Air Force Base in Alaska, it had been supporting the visit to New Zealand by President Clinton for the Asia-Pacific Economic Cooperation (APEC) summit. This contribution was subsequently increased to four C-130Hs, with 20 aircrew and 33 maintenance personnel, the additional aircraft and personnel being drawn from the 613th Air Expeditionary Group.

The first INTERFET troops to arrive in East Timor were the INTERFET Response Force, consisting of members of the Australian Special Air Service Regiment, New Zealand Special Air Service and the British Special Boat Service, who left Darwin in five RAAF and RNZAF C-130Hs on 20 September. They landed at Dili's Comoro Airport, which was quickly secured. This allowed C-130Hs from Townsville carrying the 2nd Battalion, Royal Australian Regiment (2 RAR) and two M113 armoured personnel carriers from the 3rd/4th Cavalry Regiment to land. That day, C-130s flew 33 sorties and transported 1,500 troops to East Timor. A company of Gurkhas from the 2nd Battalion, Royal Gurkha Rifles, arrived in the early hours of 21 September, and took over responsibility for guarding the UNAMET compound from the INTERFET Response Force.

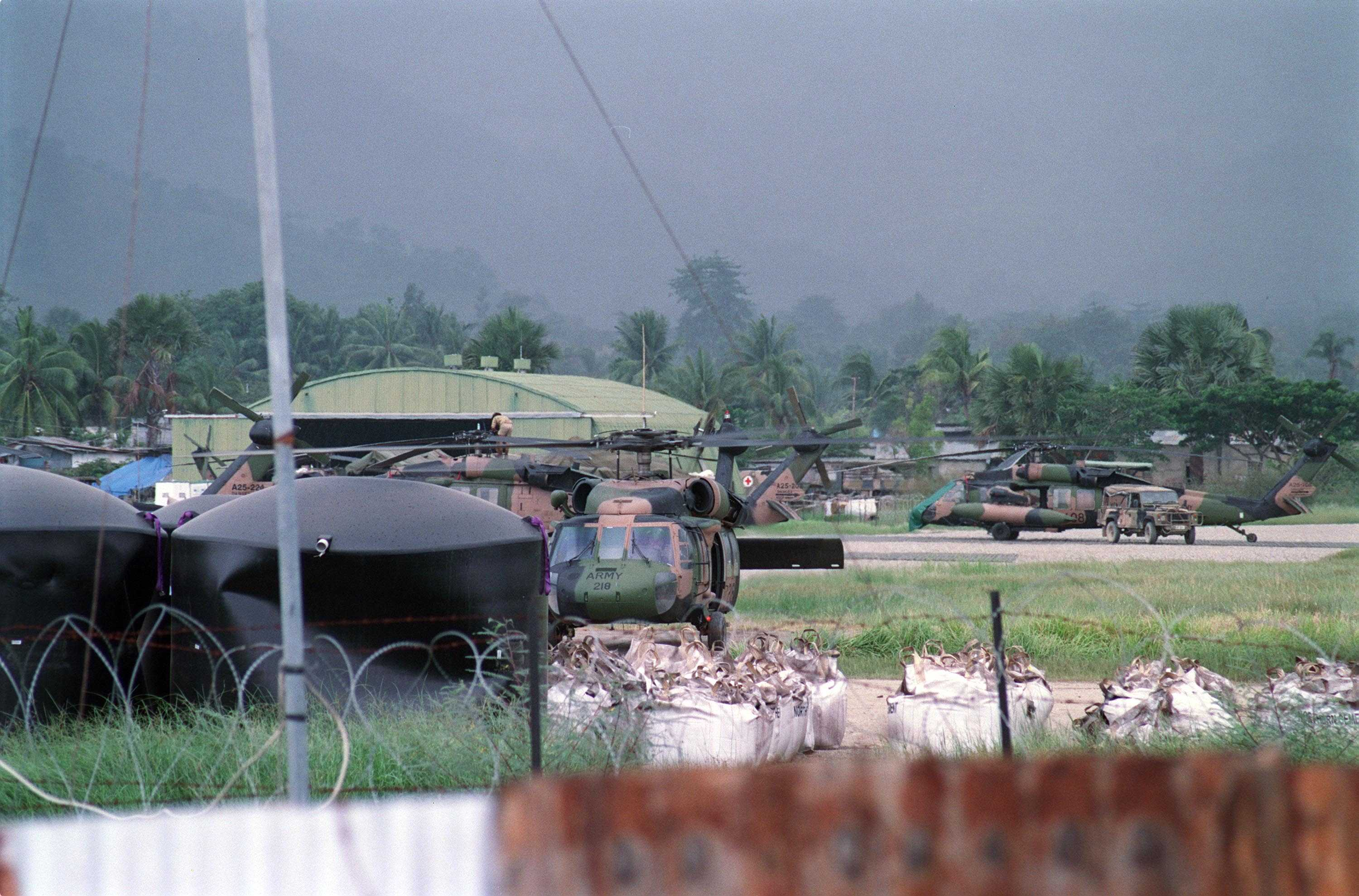
Australian Sikorsky UH-60 Black Hawk helicopters stationed at the heliport

The Dili heliport was found abandoned, but not burnt or seriously damaged. Twelve Sikorsky UH-60 Black Hawk helicopters of the Townsville-based 5th Aviation Regiment flew direct from Darwin to the heliport, albeit with ships carefully pre-positioned along their route in case any had to make an emergency landing. They were augmented by three Bell UH-1 Iroquois helicopters from No. 3 Squadron RNZAF on 26 September. This was increased to six aircraft in mid-October. Also deployed to East Timor were the Bell OH-58 Kiowa helicopters of the Army's 162nd Reconnaissance Squadron, three Beechcraft Super King Air aircraft of the 173rd Aviation Squadron, and a detachment of four DHC-4 Caribou transports from No. 86 Wing RAAF Detachment B began arriving on 10 October. INTERFET deployed a total of 49 aircraft to East Timor.

An air traffic control team headed by Squadron Leader George Christianson arrived from Townsville on the seventh aircraft to arrive at Dili with the 3rd Brigade staff, but without communications equipment. Christianson went to the control tower and explained, through an interpreter since he did not speak Indonesian, that he was a traffic controller, and joined the TNI personnel there, using their radios. No. 381 Expeditionary Combat Support Squadron RAAF assumed responsibility for the operation of the airport at Dili, while No. 382 Expeditionary Combat Support Squadron RAAF operated Cakung Airport at Baucau. The two squadrons were part of the No. 395 Expeditionary Combat Support Wing RAAF. No. 2 Airfield Defence Squadron RAAF provided security for the airports, which were secured by 2 RAR on 22 September. The RAAF was short of aircraft loaders, so they were augmented by two six-person RNZAF teams: one in Darwin and one in Dili, which joined the 22 RAAF loaders there.

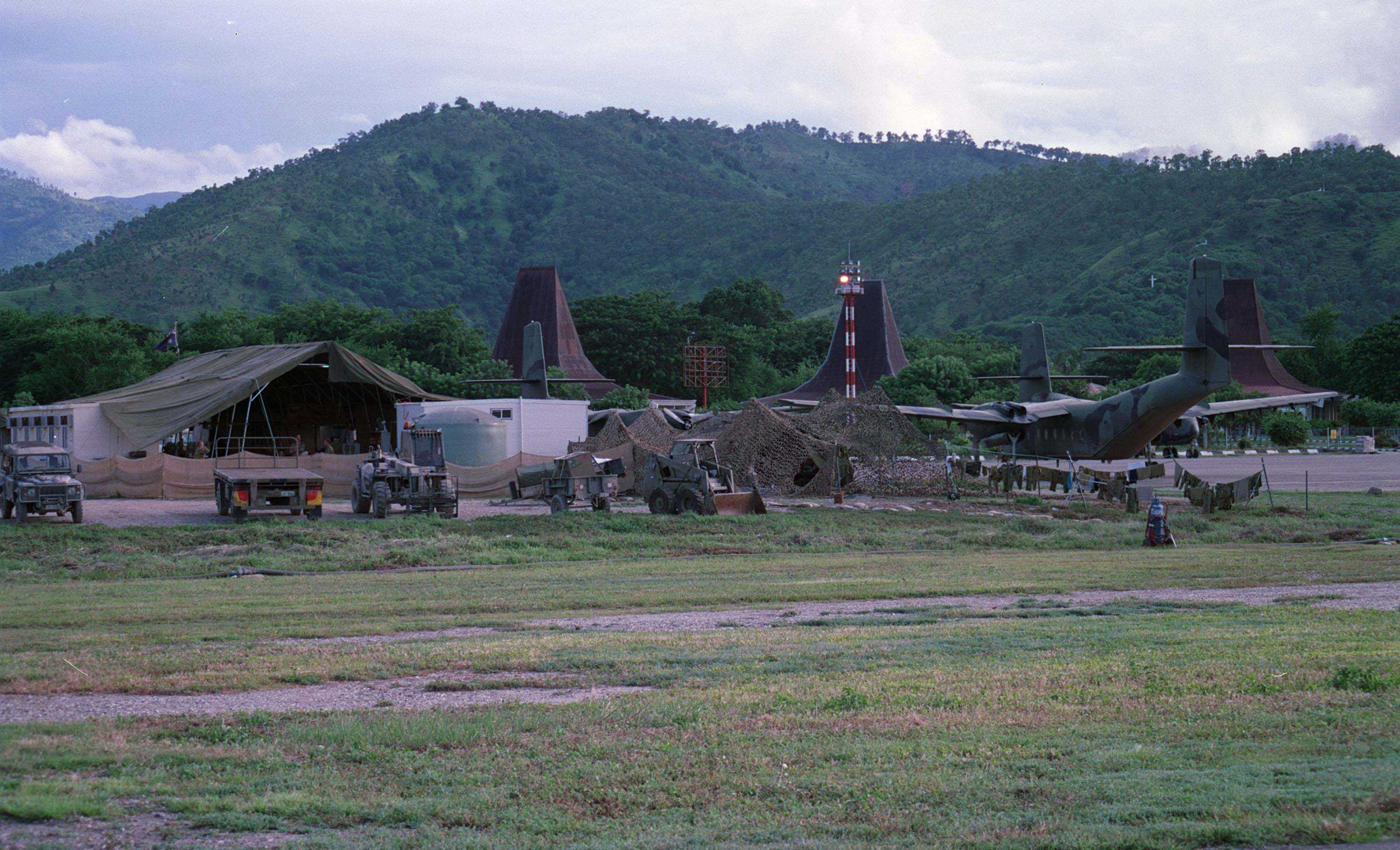
RAAF DHC-4 Caribou transports in Dili

The INTERFET Combined Air Wing (ICAW) remained based in Darwin. It was augmented by three French Air Force C-130Hs, which commenced operations from Darwin on 22 September, and two 436 Transport Squadron, Royal Canadian Air Force, CC-130s. The Canadian aircraft arrived in Townsville, along with an air movements section and a maintenance section, from their base in Trenton, Ontario, on 20 September before moving on to Darwin on 27 September. A British Royal Air Force (RAF) detachment of four C-130K Hercules arrived before 20 September, but two were withdrawn on 23 September, and a third on 1 November, reducing the RAF contingent to a lone aircraft. The RAF had a run of bad luck that included one Hercules that suffered damage to a nose wheel tyre at Dili on 20 October, and another that blew a tyre during a three-engine landing at Darwin on 21 October. In October they were joined by two Fiat G222s from the Italian Air Force, a C-130H Hercules from 601 Transport Squadron of the Royal Thai Air Force, and three Transall C-160 aircraft of the German Air Force. The eleven-nation ICAW flew 3,400 sorties in support of INTERFET, carried 9,500 tonnes (10,500 short tons) of cargo and transported more than 30,000 passengers.

=== Sealift ===
Nonetheless, 91.7 per cent of the cargo by weight and 93.2 per cent by volume, and most of the passengers arrived in East Timor by sea. A naval task force consisting of the Royal Australian Navy (RAN) landing ship HMAS Tobruk, landing craft HMAS Balikpapan, Brunei and Labuan, and the replenishment oiler HMAS Success, escorted by the frigates HMAS Adelaide, HMAS Anzac, HMNZS Te Kaha and HMS Glasgow, weighed anchor in Darwin on 18 September, and set out for East Timor, its arrival on 20 September coinciding with the airlift. The cruiser USS Mobile Bay, tanker HMNZS Endeavour, French frigate Vendémiaire and Australian frigate HMAS Darwin, were already in waters around East Timor. Endeavour carried aviation fuel, and was a particularly valuable asset as the RAN's other oiler, HMAS Westralia, was still out of action as a result of a fire in 1998.

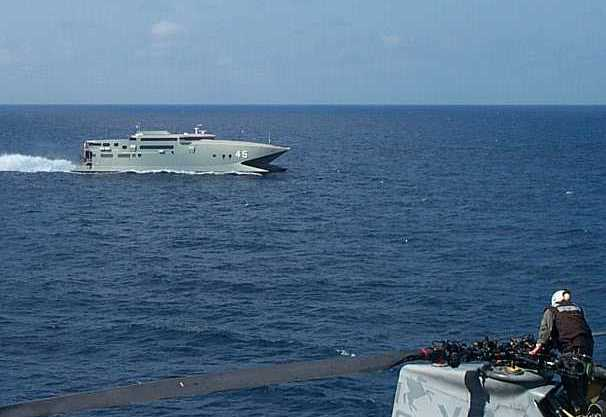
HMAS Jervis Bay

The RAN's landing ships HMAS Kanimbla and Manoora, purchased in 1994, were still being refitted, and were unavailable. To compensate for the delay in bringing them into service, the RAN had bareboat chartered a high-speed catamaran, HMAS Jervis Bay, on 10 June 1999. On 21 September, Jervis Bay arrived at Dili with 541 paratroopers from the 3rd Battalion, Royal Australian Regiment. RAN Clearance Diving Team Four carried out a reconnaissance of the harbour, and landing craft from Tobruk delivered troopers and 29 ASLAVs of the 2nd Cavalry Regiment. HMAS Tobruk made four return trips from Darwin to East Timor after the initial landing, bringing 642 soldiers and 2,000 tonnes (2,000 long tons) of cargo.

The ADF Movements staff not only had to find commercial airlift and sealift for the deployment to East Timor in a matter of days rather than the months that it would usually require, it also had to contend with the difficulty of moving troops, equipment and stores over the vast distances of Australia. Moving the 10th Force Support Battalion was a particular problem. The initial concept was that it should move overland from Townsville to Darwin, and embark for East Timor from there. But staff with the appropriate licences were not experienced in long-haul operations, and there was a high risk of loss of equipment in transit or in Darwin while awaiting shipment.

The movements officer in Sydney found two vessels whose owners were willing to charter on short notice, the Calatagan, a grain ship, and the Danish Svendborg Guardian, a container ship. Neither was particularly suitable, and the crews spoke little English, but with the help of a local stevedore company, the ships were modified by the installation of tie down restraints. Some 7,000 square metres (75,000 sq ft) of vehicles and equipment were moved directly from Townsville to Dili without loss. Another 3,000 square metres (32,000 sq ft) of vehicles and equipment had to be moved by road to Darwin, from whence it was shipped to Dili in vessels that included the Siroco, Singaporean RSS Intrepid, and the Danish civilian ship Arktis Atlantic.

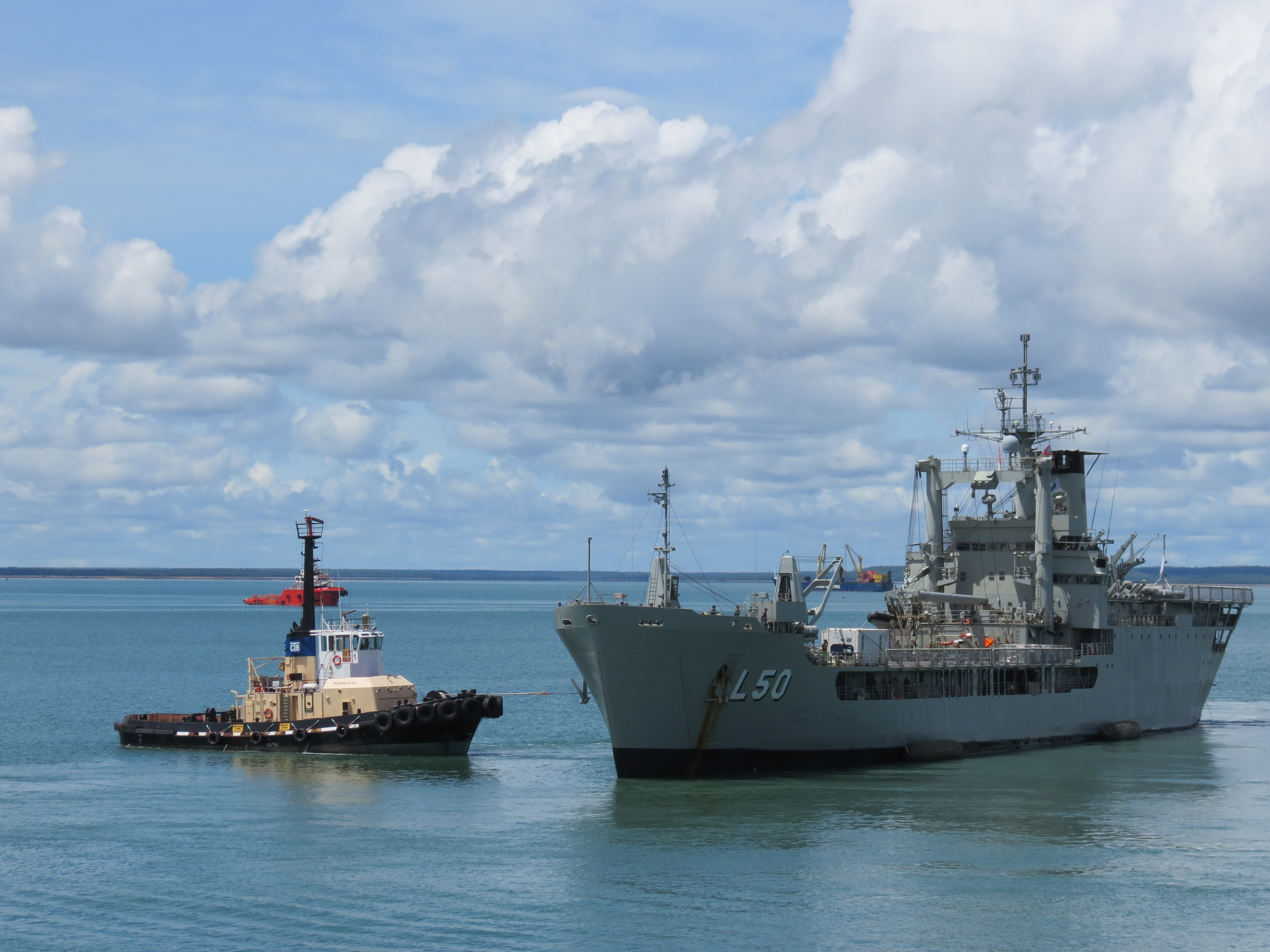
HMAS Tobruk (right) with the CTB tug Marrakai

During Operation Stabilise, the ADF chartered seventeen commercial vessels to supplement its strategic lift capability. All were foreign, as the Department of Defence did not feel that Australian vessels offered the best value for money. The operation put the port of Darwin under great strain, and the facilities were upgraded, lifting the wharf capacity to 70 tonnes (77 short tons). To reduce the strain on Darwin's facilities, casualties were evacuated to other cities, and where practical purchasing was conducted in Sydney to avoid overburdening local suppliers. The Darwin Port Authority, which managed the port with the assistance of a lone ADF liaison officer, were able to increase the port's turnover fourfold, and no shipping delays occurred.

== Operations ==
=== Distribution ===
To effect Cosgrove's operational concept of flooding East Timor with as many combat troops as possible, Mark Evans deployed his brigade with a minimum of vehicles and logistical support. Unlike exercises conducted in northern Australia in the 1980s and 1990s, the logistical support would follow the combat troops, and not be pre-positioned to receive them. Since the operational situation was uncertain, demand for items like ammunition and medical supplies could not be forecast. The plan therefore was to build up stockpiles in Darwin from DNSDC in Sydney, and then forward them on demand to 10 FSB by air to Comoro airport via the ICAW or by sea to the port of Dili by HMAS Jervis Bay and Tobruk. 10 FSB would then distribute them to 3 BASB or directly to the troops. To send supplies directly to Dili would have resulted in their arrival without troops to receive them, facilities to store them, or transport to distribute them, as had occurred to Australian forces in the Vietnam War in 1966. Cousins set priorities on the advice of Colonel Ash Power, Cosgrove's operations officer. Contingency stocks were held offshore on HMAS Success.

ADF cargo was tracked using three computer systems, the Standard Defence Supply System (SDSS), Lotus Notes Interim Demand System (LNIDS), and the Cargo Visibility System (CVS). These had been employed by the ADF Peace Monitoring Group in Bougainville in 1994, and had been improved as a result of that experience. The problem of disjointed logistics systems had been recognised for years. CVS was not used in Operation Warden, as it could not handle large volumes of urgent requirements. SDSS was the Department of Defence's preferred system, but units in the field preferred the simpler LNIDS, even for inventory items, which it was not intended to handle.

McManus's FLSG had responsibility for the purchase, receipt, storage and forwarding of supplies from Darwin. He did not have sufficient operators trained in the use of SDSS and LNIDS to track their movements and order items such as spare parts, nor did he have sufficient personnel to prepare pallets or load aircraft, and there were only four trained staff who were available to deal with what soon became a flood of mail. He established an ad hoc unit called the Top End Distribution Squadron (TEDS), and leased some former military warehouses in the Darwin suburb of Berrimah from their new owners, where stocks could be held until called forward. A terminal operations unit was created at RAAF Base Darwin to handle air dispatch. He coordinated air delivery with No. 395 Expeditionary Combat Support Wing and No. 321 Expeditionary Combat Support Squadron RAAF at RAAF Base Darwin, and sea delivery with the HMAS Coonawarra naval base. Eventually some 120 personnel were assigned to the FLSG, drawn from 9th and 10th Force Support Battalions and the 7th Combat Service Support Battalion. Kinloch was appointed commander, Land Component Support Group, and would be responsible for the support of the advance elements in Dili until the 10th Force Support Battalion arrived.

=== Sustainment ===
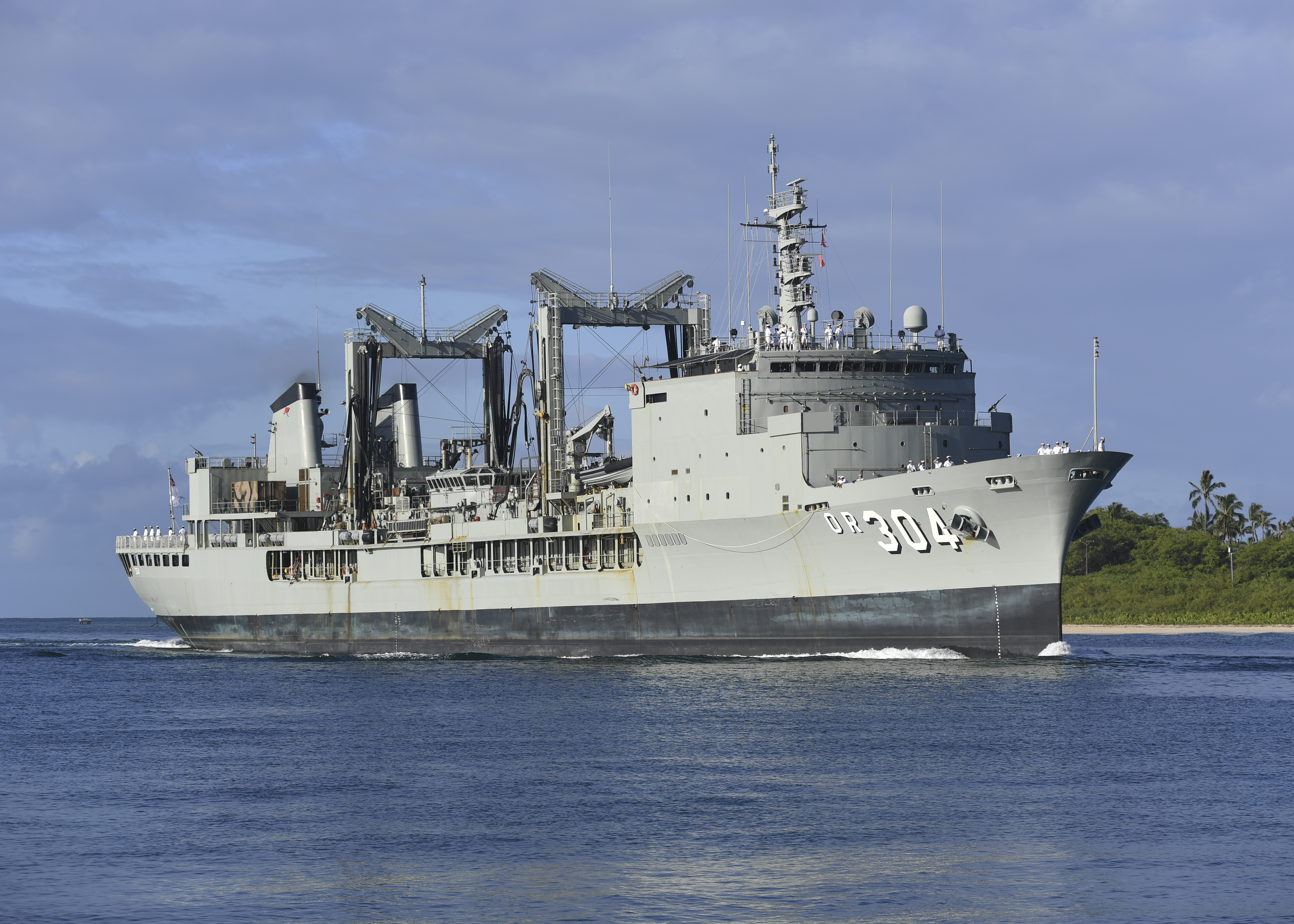
HMAS Success

The first priority was water. Until engineer units with boring equipment arrived, there was no potable water in Dili. Every soldier had to carry a day's supply, which meant 8 to 10 litres (1.8 to 2.2 imp gal; 2.1 to 2.6 US gal) on their backs. Another day's supply went with the troops on their aircraft and ships as packaged water. Two water tankers, each holding 22,000 litres (4,800 imp gal; 5,800 US gal), arrived on 21 September on landing craft. These were used to refill jerry cans sent by sea and air. HMAS Tobruk carried three trucks loaded with bottled water and jerry cans. Contingency stocks were held offshore on HMAS Success. Similarly, Cousins had each soldier carry a day's combat rations. He anticipated that everyone would be eating combat rations for at least two, and possibly three weeks. Additional rations were carried on HMAS Tobruk and Jervis Bay, but the first substantial resupply did not occur until Tobruk returned on 26 September. A contingency stock of 10,000 combat rations was held on HMAS Success. Non-Australian contingents had been instructed to bring 42 days' supplies with them, but most arrived requiring assistance with their immediate needs, including catering, transport and unloading their equipment and supplies. The first contingent of Filipino troops arrived without rations or water.

Fuel presented a problem because the ADF had no ship-to-shore refuelling capability. Naval units were the sole source of the diesel and aviation fuel for units in East Timor for the first three months of Operation Stabilise, during which INTERFET consumed 3,000 litres (660 imp gal; 790 US gal) of fuel per day. Initially, packaged fuel was flown from HMAS Success to the heliport by RAN Westland Sea King helicopters in collapsible fuel drums as underslung loads. Once Army tanker trucks arrived in mid-October, they were driven onto landing craft from the hard stand east of the wharf, taken out to HMAS Success, and then refuelled while alongside. This process took about five hours. Drivers of the fuel and water tankers were invited to come aboard HMAS Success, where they could take a shower, enjoy a hot meal, and have their clothes laundered while they waited for the tanker to be refilled. HMNZS Endeavour ran a shuttle service to East Timor from Singapore or Darwin, typically replenishing HMAS Success with 150 tonnes (150 long tons) of aviation fuel and 2,200 tonnes (2,200 long tons) of diesel fuel on each run. Endeavour returned home on 20 October, followed by Success, which was relieved by HMCS Protecteur, which arrived with a Sea King from 443 Maritime Helicopter Squadron.

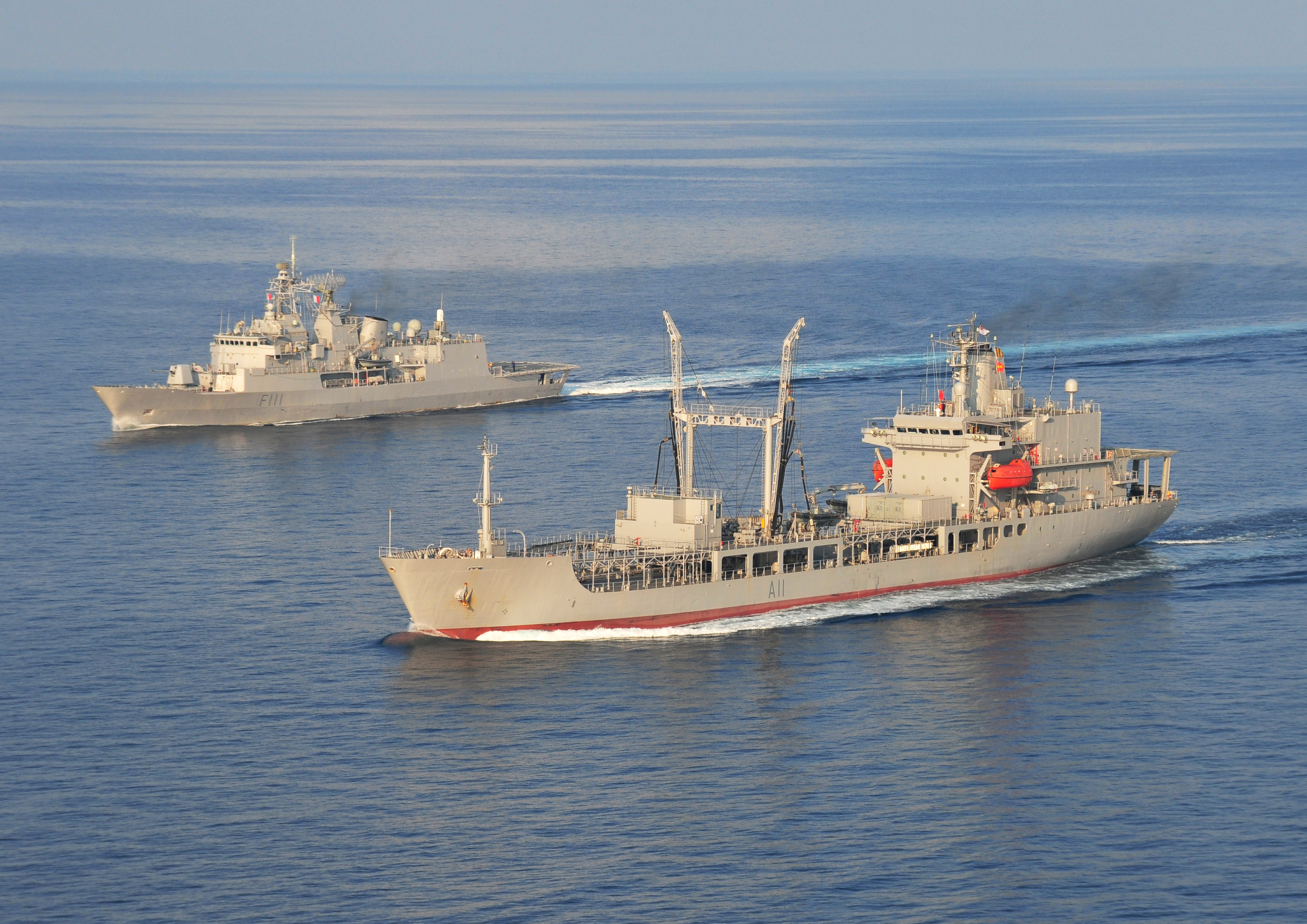
HMNZS Endeavour (right) escorted by HMNZS Te Mana (left)

Each soldier carried an initial supply of ammunition. More stocks arrived on HMAS Tobruk and Jervis Bay, and contingency reserves were held on ships in Dili harbour. Due to its weight, ammunition resupply was by sea rather than by air. For other items such as spare parts and medical supplies, each unit was directed to bring 15 to 30 days' supply. While the 1,500 soldiers of the 3rd Brigade had limited stocks of ammunition on hand, there were some 15,000 TNI troops in the area, who presumably had plenty of ammunition. Nor were the air and sea bridges secure from interception: the TNI had naval assets in the area that included surface combatants and two Type 209 submarines, and intelligence sources reported that TNI aircraft based in West Timor included three BAE Systems Hawks, North American Rockwell OV-10 Broncos, an Aérospatiale SA 330 Puma and a CASA C-212 Aviocar. RAAF Lockheed P-3 Orions kept a lookout for the submarines, and two McDonnell Douglas F/A-18 Hornets were kept on standby in case air defence or close air support missions were required.

The supply plan was simple, but finely tuned, with little room for error. It fell apart in the first 48 hours. Medical personnel and supplies were unexpectedly delayed. This was critical, as it was not known whether there would be casualties. There were unforeseen requirements like RAAF personnel and equipment to run the airport, and, unlike Operation Spitfire, the ADF was not ICAW's only customer. There was political pressure to deploy media representatives and UNAMET personnel with their equipment and stores, and the remaining elements of 2 RAR and 3 BASB with their vehicles and stores, and bottled water, were pushed back in the queue. Members of the 3rd Brigade who wanted to join their comrades in East Timor were frustrated at seeing others boarding flights instead of themselves, and subjected the movements staff to abuse. An abandoned fleet of Land Rover Discovery vehicles was made available to INTERFET at the UNAMET compound, which partially offset 2 RAR's vehicle shortage. The emergency stocks of water on HMAS Success had to be brought ashore immediately, and 2 RAR commandeered water that had been flown in as part of 3 BASB's stocks. When 3 RAR arrived on Jervis Bay with 500 cartons of bottled water, they handed over part of this stockpile to 2 RAR.

Dili, Baucau and Lospalos were secured by 4 October, and the INTERFET forces began moving into the areas adjoining the border with West Timor. The first phase of this was Operation Lavarack, in which 2 RAR moved by air and B Squadron, 3rd/4th Cavalry Regiment, with its armoured personnel carriers, by sea, to occupy Balibo, which was secured on 5 October. Maliana, in the middle of the border between East and West Timor was next, on 10 October. Operation Strand, the landings at Suai on the south coast, commenced on 6 October. Then, on 22 October, Operation Respite began, and secured the isolated Oecussi enclave. Finally, on 21 November, the Gurkhas landed on Atauro island, north of Dili.

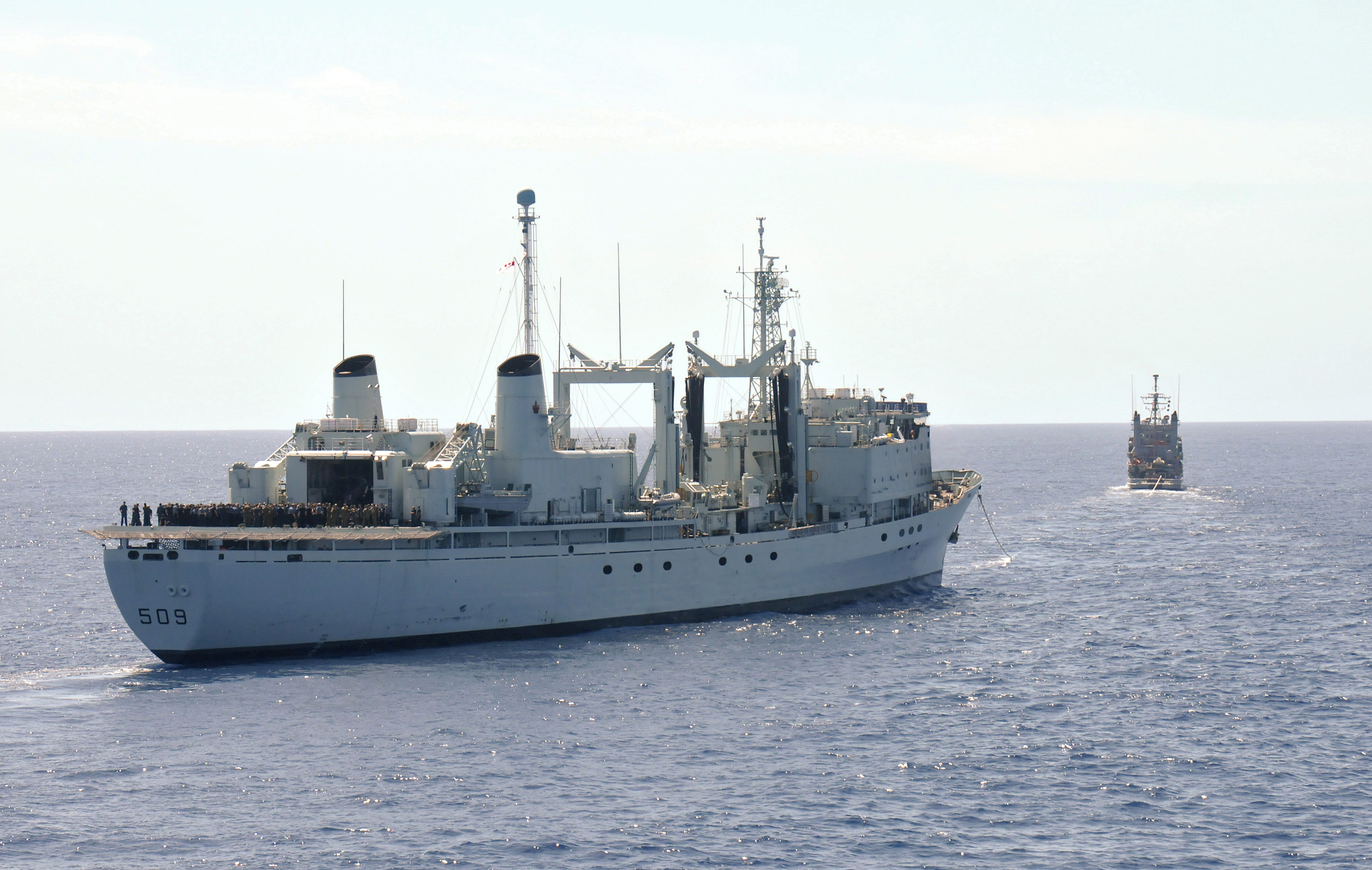
HMCS Protecteur (left) in 2014 with the tugboat USNS Sioux

It was imperative to get 10 FSB to Dili before unit-level supplies and the reserves held by the Land Component Support Group had been consumed. A seven-man reconnaissance party led by Kehoe flew from Townsville to Darwin via Brisbane on a Qantas flight on 26 September, and thence to Dili on a French C-130H the next day. Kehoe decided to establish 10 FSB at the port, despite the risk involved in storing ammunition there. He flew back to Darwin to meet the Advance Party, who flew direct to Darwin from Garbutt Airport on an Air Niugini aircraft on 30 September, and then travelled to Dili overnight on HMAS Jervis Bay. The main body followed by the same route on 8 October.

Colonel Grant Cavanaugh was appointed the commander of the Logistic Support HQ. He had arrived in Dili on 24 September, but had no staff, and no authority over Kinloch, who was answerable to Mark Evans, or McManus, who was answerable to Cosgrove. To fill out Cavanaugh's HQ, Wilkinson stripped his own. Wilkinson was assisted by students from the Australian Command and Staff College, who helped draw up a 40-page force-level logistic operation order with 54 annexes. The deployment of 10 FSB was delayed due to a decision to give priority to unloading the vehicles and stores of the 5th/7th Battalion, Royal Australian Regiment (5/7 RAR), and 10 FSB did not become operational until 20 October. By 14 October, the APCs of B Squadron, 3rd/4th Cavalry Regiment, were barely serviceable. The vehicles' track pads had been worn down through three weeks of high tempo operations, and there were no spare parts to conduct necessary maintenance or repairs. Some vehicles were deadlined, while restrictions were imposed on the use of others until the remainder of B Squadron arrived a week later with spare parts. The 8-tonne (7.9-long-ton; 8.8-short-ton) Mack trucks were no longer in production, and spare parts had to be custom made.

Movements staff gave priority to food, water, fuel and ammunition. Foreign contingents complained about confusion over priority and authority. The Canadian contingent reported that in Darwin:

Priority of shipments/movement of personnel set by JMCC [Joint Movements Coordination Centre] was sometimes questionable. This remained a major problem for the most part of the tour as priorities were changed on a daily basis, we saw pallets of beer being loaded on hercs [Hercules aircraft] while our NCE [National Command Element] vehicles were still waiting in the holding area at the airport. Darwin was a real bottleneck and it was felt on many occasions that the lines of Comm[unications] between INTERFET and AS [Australia] in Darwin were non existent and that pers[onnel] in Darwin had no authority to take decisions.

=== Construction ===
The first sappers to arrive in East Timor were the 3rd Combat Engineer Regiment, the main body of which had arrived on HMAS Jervis Bay on 27 September. It was operating in support of the 3rd Brigade. The 198th Works Section deployed on 2 and 5 October. This was a unit that planned, coordinated and managed construction tasks. Between 10 and 13 October, Colonel Ahmad Mostafa conducted a detailed engineering reconnaissance of East Timor, and developed an engineering plan. He identified three major engineering challenges. The first was roads. The 3rd Combat Engineer Regiment devoted much of its time to maintaining roads and bridges, but the imminent rainy season threatened to make them impassable. It also would potentially reduce INTERFET's vehicle and accommodation areas and the airport to quagmires. The provision of hard stands to prevent this was the second challenge. The third was waste disposal. Human waste was being disposed of with hundreds of portaloos that had been brought from Australia, and were routinely emptied by sewage collection trucks. Dry waste was disposed of in a rubbish tip that had been established at Comoro.

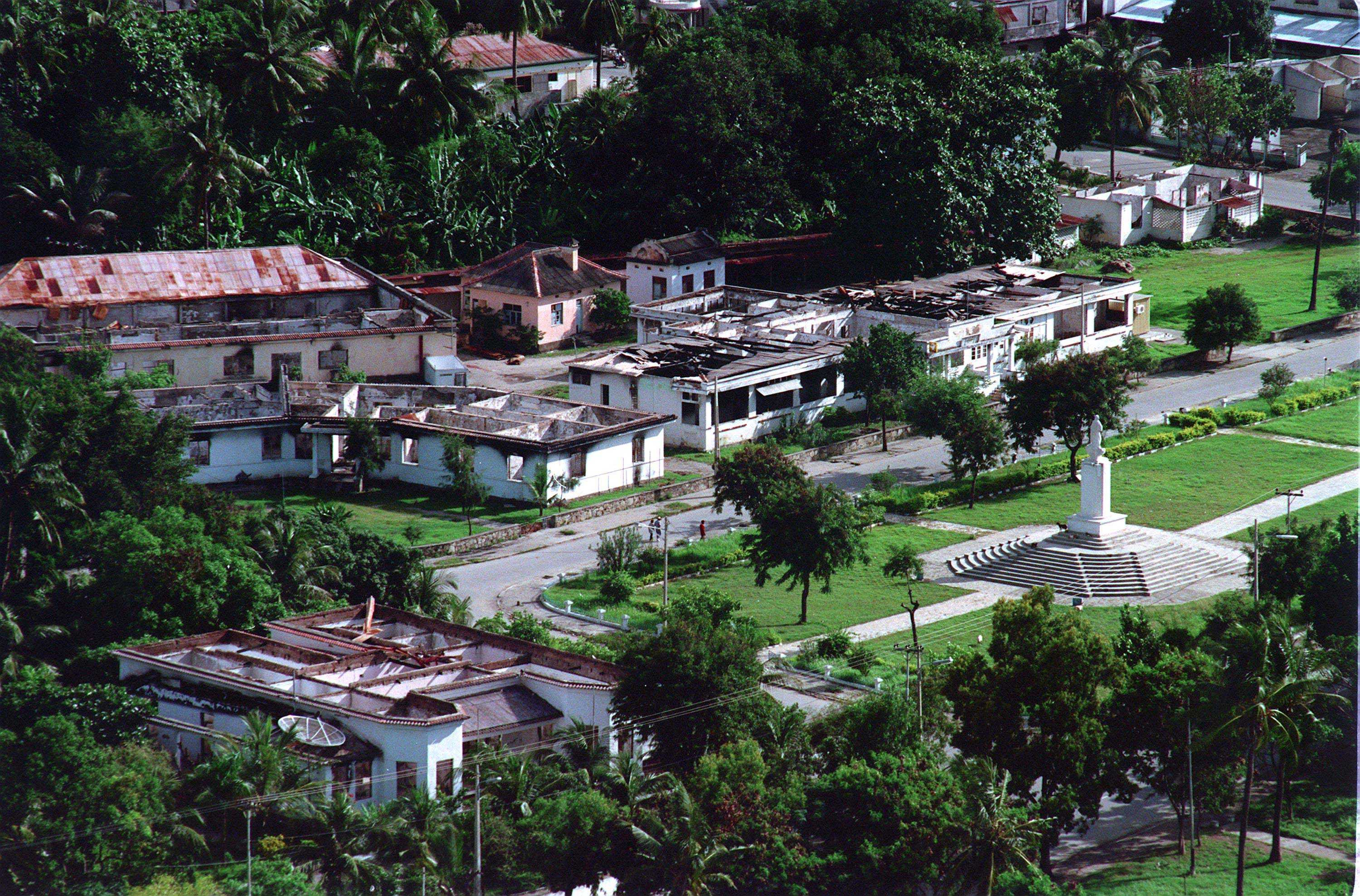
Devastation in Dili in February 2000

At an early stage it was appreciated that what little infrastructure there was in East Timor was being destroyed by the pro-Indonesia militia, but there was no engineering staff at DJFHQ. The ADF's engineering capability had been reduced by defence cuts, but the Army still maintained two construction squadrons, largely thanks to its involvement in the Aboriginal and Torres Strait Islander Commission's Army Community Assistance Program (AACAP), which provided facilities for indigenous communities in remote areas. In August 1999, the 17th Construction Squadron was in Sydney on 180 days' notice to move, having just completed an AACAP tour in Jumbun, Queensland, while the 21st Construction Squadron was in Rockhampton, supporting Crocodile 99. The 17th Construction Squadron was placed on 28 days' notice to move on 13 September, but was not given more personnel to bring it up to full strength, nor authorisation to requisition or purchase engineering stocks and equipment. On 20 September it was given seven days' notice to move. Only then was it topped up with 22 sappers from other units. It was hoped that engineering requirements would be met by other nations, but this did not occur. Appeals to contribute engineering units produced a construction troop from Kenya, which was due to arrive in late December.

The advance party of the 17th Construction Squadron assumed responsibility for the main water point in Dili from the 3rd Combat Engineer Regiment on 14 October, and began looking for other water sources. The main body arrived in East Timor with its 160 personnel and 130 vehicles on 26 October. Abandoned bores were restored, and filters and chlorinators installed, giving both INTERFET personnel and the civilian population access to a regular supply of clean drinking water. Major General Desmond Mueller's Support Command supplemented the 17th Construction Squadron's equipment with a newly purchased rock crusher, track-mounted concrete batch plant, and a cherry picker. Its task was complicated by unfilled requisitions, which the overburdened supply system could not meet.

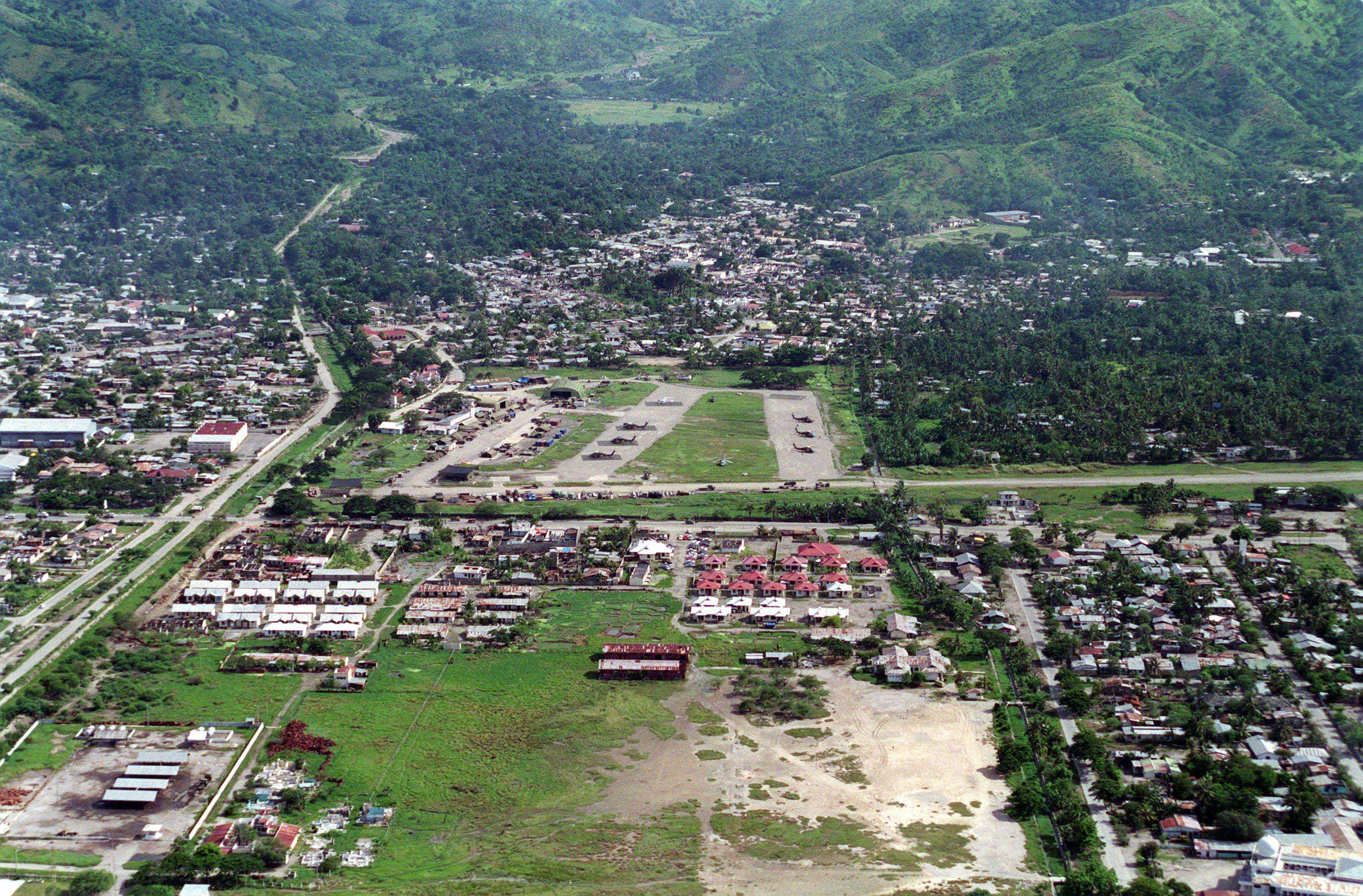
The Dili heliport in February 2000

The 17th Construction Squadron's next priority was upgrading the Dili heliport to facilitate all-weather operations. The heliport was located on low ground that was susceptible to flooding in the wet season. The 198th Works Section produced a design that called for the excavation of the subbase, the construction of hard stands, and laying pierced aluminium plank for eleven helipads. The work was carried out by the 17th Construction Squadron, and took four weeks to complete. At Suai, the airstrip was upgraded to support all-weather C-130 operations. The runway was extended by 150 metres (490 ft), and a turning node added. Hard stands were provided, along with accommodation, workshops and five helipads.

Mostafa was determined to have 21st Construction Squadron sent to East Timor as well, but senior Department of Defence officials were concerned that the INTERFET was going beyond its mandate, and developing East Timor's infrastructure – the reason for not deploying engineer construction assets in the first place. Finally, on 8 November, the 21st Construction Squadron was ordered to send a plant troop group to East Timor to assist in road maintenance, its numbers capped at 80 personnel. The main body arrived in Dili on 3 December, but the ship carrying its heavy plant and equipment did not reach Brisbane until 27 November, and broke down several times en route. Work on the roads finally commenced on 17 December. The 21st Construction Squadron repaired the main route from Dili to Aileu. The Kenyan troop arrived on 26 December and worked on repairing the roads to the south. After an initial downpour, the rainy season was not as severe as feared, but the departure of the 3rd Combat Engineer Regiment in mid-January left no resources to maintain the roads in the border areas.

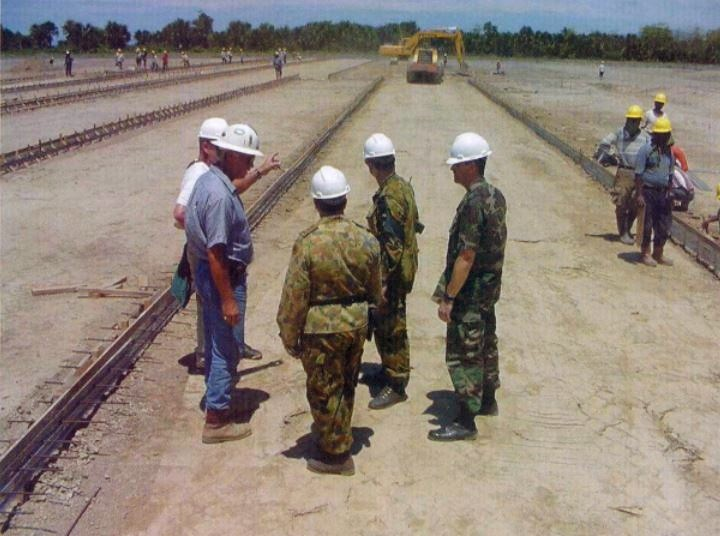
US and Australian construction personnel at Dili airport

To resolve the waste disposal problem, the 17th Construction Squadron erected ATCO ablution buildings, with pump-out septic tanks and an independent water supply. Laundry buildings were assembled with associated plumbing and electrical fittings, and separate treatment facilities for black and grey water. A solid waste disposal site was developed about 10 kilometres (6.2 mi) from Dili. A semi-permanent camp for up to 500 personnel with ATCO-style accommodation was established at Dili airport. Horizontal works were carried out by the 17th Construction Squadron, while the No. 381 Expeditionary Combat Support Squadron erected the buildings. Finally, the 17th Construction Squadron built a facility for cleaning stores, equipment and vehicles being returned to Australia to comply with Australia's strict quarantine regulations. This facility had 20 bays with water tanks and pumps, and associated electrical, plumbing and water reticulation.

=== Amenities ===
By late October 1999, expectations that units in East Timor could live more comfortably began to build. In Sydney, Lieutenant Colonel Dianne Gallasch negotiated contracts for deliveries of fresh produce to be shipped from Darwin, and established a flexible resupply system for rations. Refrigerated containers, generators and kitchen trailers were shipped to East Timor, allowing hot meals to be provided by 22 field kitchens six weeks after the first troops arrived in Dili. Yet many soldiers were still sleeping on the ground. There were still no laundry facilities, so soldiers washed their clothes in old ration tins. Funds were provided to hire East Timorese civilians to provide laundry facilities, but some units were more successful than others in using them wisely.

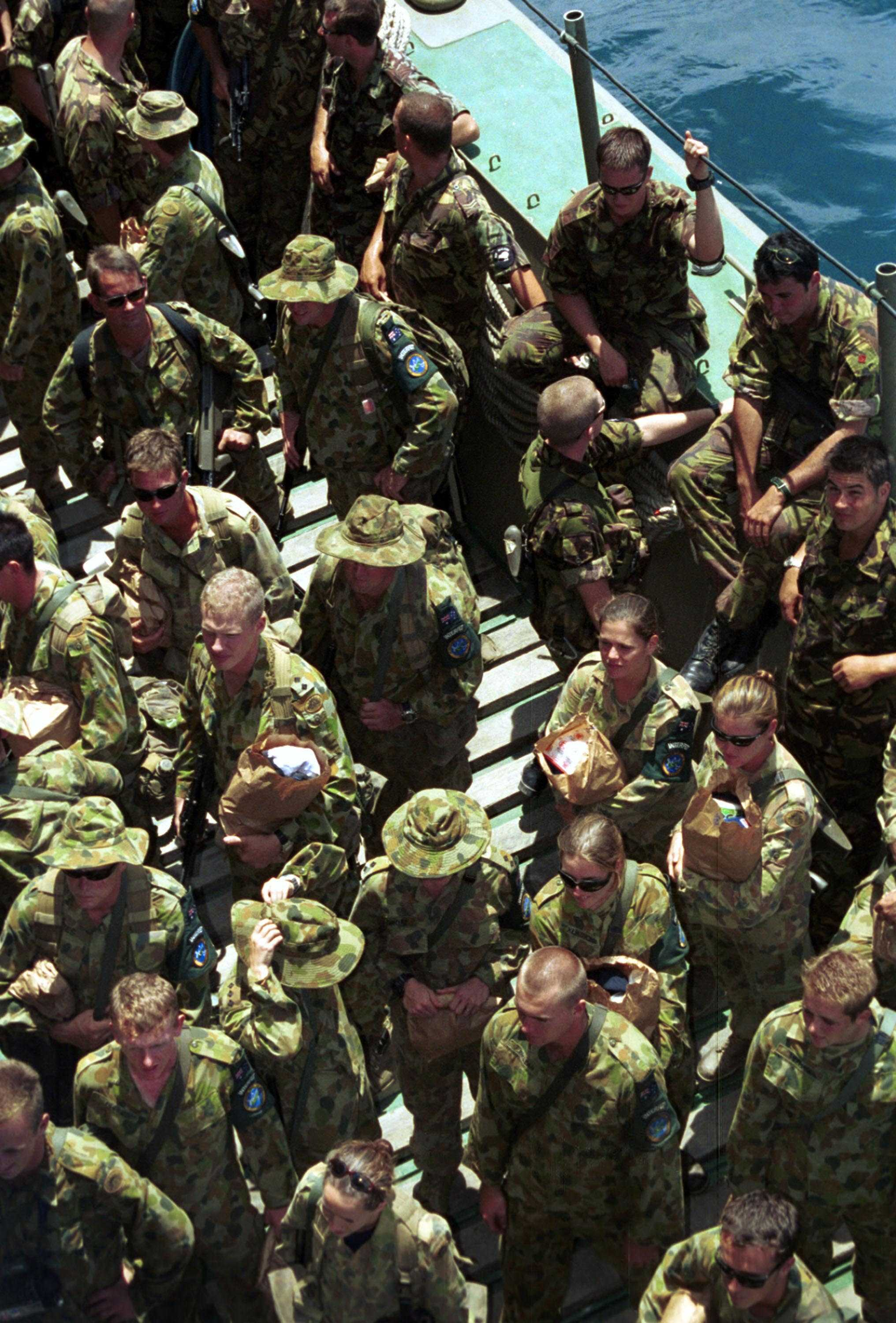
Australian troops come alongside USS Blue Ridge at anchor 3 kilometres (3,000 yd) off the coast of Dili, East Timor for a day of meetings and rest

Cousins pressed for tents and camping stores to be sent, which Support Command in Melbourne struggled to provide among competing priorities. Cosgrove assigned top priority to maintaining the tempo of operations, and second to building up stocks of food, fuel, water and ammunition in time for the rainy season. As a veteran of the Vietnam War, where the Army had lived rough for longer periods, he believed that the troops could go without amenities for a bit longer. The Land Commander Australia, Major General John Hartley, visited East Timor on 4 and 5 November, and produced a report that was highly critical of the performance of Treloar and Mueller.

Throughout November, logistical personnel in Australia and East Timor worked to reduce the backlogs, build up stockpiles for the rainy season, and improve the living conditions of the troops in the field. FLSG forwarded an average of 176 tonnes (194 short tons) of cargo per day, and 60 refrigerated containers of fresh produce each week. The backlog of spare parts was overcome in early November, and canteens and showers were available in Balibo. On 12 November, 2 RAR finally received a full complement of camp stores, including tents, chairs, tables, stretchers and duckboards. On 15 December, Support HQ assumed responsibility for the support of the forces in East Timor.

=== Helicopters ===
Unloading was difficult in the primitive conditions of the damaged ports in East Timor, especially at Suai, where there was no equipment to unload the containers that the Canadians and New Zealanders had brought their stores in. The containers had to be unloaded from HMAS Tobruk with one of its cranes onto a heavy landing craft, to be picked up by a side-loading truck when it reached the shore. This was neither quick nor safe. A better solution would have been to unload with heavy lift helicopters, but the RAN had none, and the Australian Army's CH-47 Chinooks were grounded due to problems with the transmissions. Australia Theatre HQ asked the United States Pacific Command (PACOM) for assistance. On 29 September, the United States Secretary of Defense, William Cohen, provided four CH-53 Sea Stallion helicopters from the 31st Marine Expeditionary Unit, which operated from the Landing Helicopter Assault (LHA) ship USS Peleliu. They were replaced on 5 October by helicopters of the 11th Marine Expeditionary Unit, which flew from the LHA USS Belleau Wood. The LHAs provided excellent maintenance support for the helicopters, and represented the United States while not adding to the US footprint ashore, but deploying thousands of sailors and marines just to support four helicopters was uneconomical.

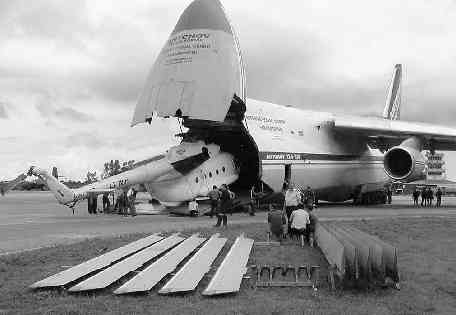
One of the two Mi-8 medium-lift helicopters from Bulgaria is unloaded from a Russian AN-124 transport

PACOM turned to the US Army's Logistics Civil Augmentation Program (LOGCAP). Two Mi-8 and two Mi-26 helicopters with air and maintenance crews were provided under contract by DynCorp. Operating helicopters ashore in the upcoming monsoon season required the construction of concrete helipads at Dili airport, but East Timor lacked the facilities to produce the concrete. All the construction equipment required, along with trained operators, had to be brought in. Providing food for the 100 personnel of the air, ground and construction crews, and fuel for their vehicles and helicopters, became an Australian responsibility under the bilateral Acquisition and Cross-Servicing Agreement (ACSA) with the United States. Australian Theatre also helped with the movement of the personnel and equipment through the PACOM staging post in Darwin. The two Mi-8s, along with their spare parts and a fuel tanker, were flown from Bulgaria to East Timor in Russian AN-124 transport aircraft. The two Mi-26s flew from Russia under their own power, a trip that took ten days. Between December 1999 and February 2000, the four helicopters flew 475 hours without mishap, carrying 6,400 passengers and 850 tonnes (840 long tons) of cargo.

=== Medical ===
The vaccination regime for Japanese encephalitis proved effective, and there were no recorded INTERFET cases. The main diseases affecting the troops were dengue fever and malaria, with 306 and 334 cases respectively. Both were endemic in East Timor. Australian troops recorded 224 cases of dengue fever In East Timor. There was no dengue vaccine, although there was some evidence that the Japanese encephalitis vaccine was partially effective against dengue. Nor was there any treatment other than rest until the patient recovered. Preventative measures for mosquito-borne diseases like dengue and malaria included the use of insect repellents, permethrin-treated mosquito nets, and mosquito control measures such as spraying suspected breeding areas with insecticides. A particular concern with dengue was that troops returning from East Timor to bases in Northern Queensland might cause an outbreak in Australia, as the area was receptive to dengue due to the presence of its principal vector, the Aedes aegypti mosquito. Nine confirmed cases were reported among soldiers in Townsville, who were closely monitored, but none among the civilian population.

As in previous wars, malaria was a major concern, and one Malaysian UN observer died from malaria. A prophylactic regime was instituted whereby ADF personnel were given a daily dose of 100 milligrams (1.5 gr) of doxycycline commencing two days before departure from Australia and continuing for two weeks after returning to Australia. For those who suffered adverse side effects, a weekly dose of 250 milligrams (3.9 gr) of mefloquine was substituted. A terminal prophylaxis of 7.5 milligrams (0.116 gr) of primaquine three times a day was administered for three weeks after return from Australia. In addition, a small team from the Australian Army Malaria Institute headed by Major Scott J. Kitchener went to Dili as advisors. Subsequent trials of mefloquine in East Timor in 2001 and 2002 found that about 6.5 per cent of soldiers suffered side effects from it, mainly of a neuropsychiatric nature. There are ongoing concerns about the use of the drug.

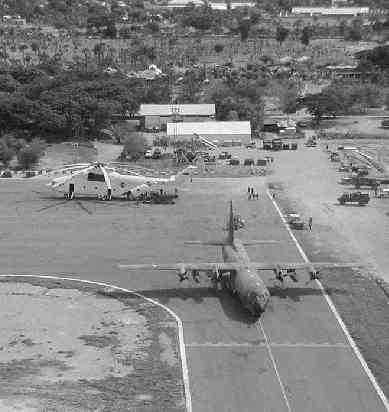
Mi-26 heavy-lift helicopter and C-130H Hercules transport at the Dili airfield

The results showed that the memory of previous campaigns had faded since the Vietnam War ended in 1975 at every level of command. Officers failed to supervise the chemoprophylaxis regimen, and while most soldiers dutifully took their tablets, some did not. Both Plasmodium falciparum and Plasmodium vivax are endemic in East Timor, and the prevalence of malaria among the civilian population was much greater than usual in September 2000, due to many people fleeing from the violence into the jungle where there was greater exposure to mosquitoes. There were 64 cases of malaria among ADF personnel in East Timor. Since there was no evidence of resistance against doxycycline, the cause was either failure to take the tablets or their deterioration under tropical conditions. About two-thirds of cases were falciparum, the remainder being vivax. The falciparum cases were treated with a combination of quinine, mefloquine and doxycycline, while the vivax cases were treated with a combination of chloroquine and primaquine.

Another 212 cases were reported from ADF personnel after they returned to Australia. All were falciparum cases except for two who developed vivax within two weeks of return. Primaquine resistance has been documented in Papua New Guinea but not in East Timor, but the terminal regimen was not as effective as hoped. In any case, it was the only drug capable of eliminating the malaria parasites from the liver, so cases were administered another course of chloroquine and primaquine. It was noted that compliance with the treatment was excellent among those who had already suffered an attack of malaria. Some 44 cases had a relapse, eleven had a second relapse, and two had a third.

INTERFET's medical resources were stretched by the East Timorese civilian population, many of them children, who had broken bones or infected wounds from edged weapons. Some had fractures that had been improperly set. The available medical supplies were insufficient to cope with the demand, and the soldiers scrounged for medical supplies from abandoned clinics, the Dili General Hospital, and TNI stores. In mid-October, the INTERFET Field Surgical Team (FST) opened the INTERFET Hospital in the Museum building with 55 beds and a range of medical and surgical services. Personnel for the unit were drawn from the Army's 1st Field Hospital in Brisbane, and the 6th RAAF Hospital in Laverton, Victoria. The personnel had experience from Operation Shaddock, the deployment to Papua New Guinea to assist victims of the 1998 tsunami. While 80 per cent of admissions were of INTERFET personnel, the hospital also treated East Timorese and other civilians. The INTERFET Hospital maintained the only fully equipped intensive care unit in Dili. Less urgent cases were referred to the French Military Hospital and the Dili General Hospital, which was run by the Red Cross.

=== Civil affairs ===
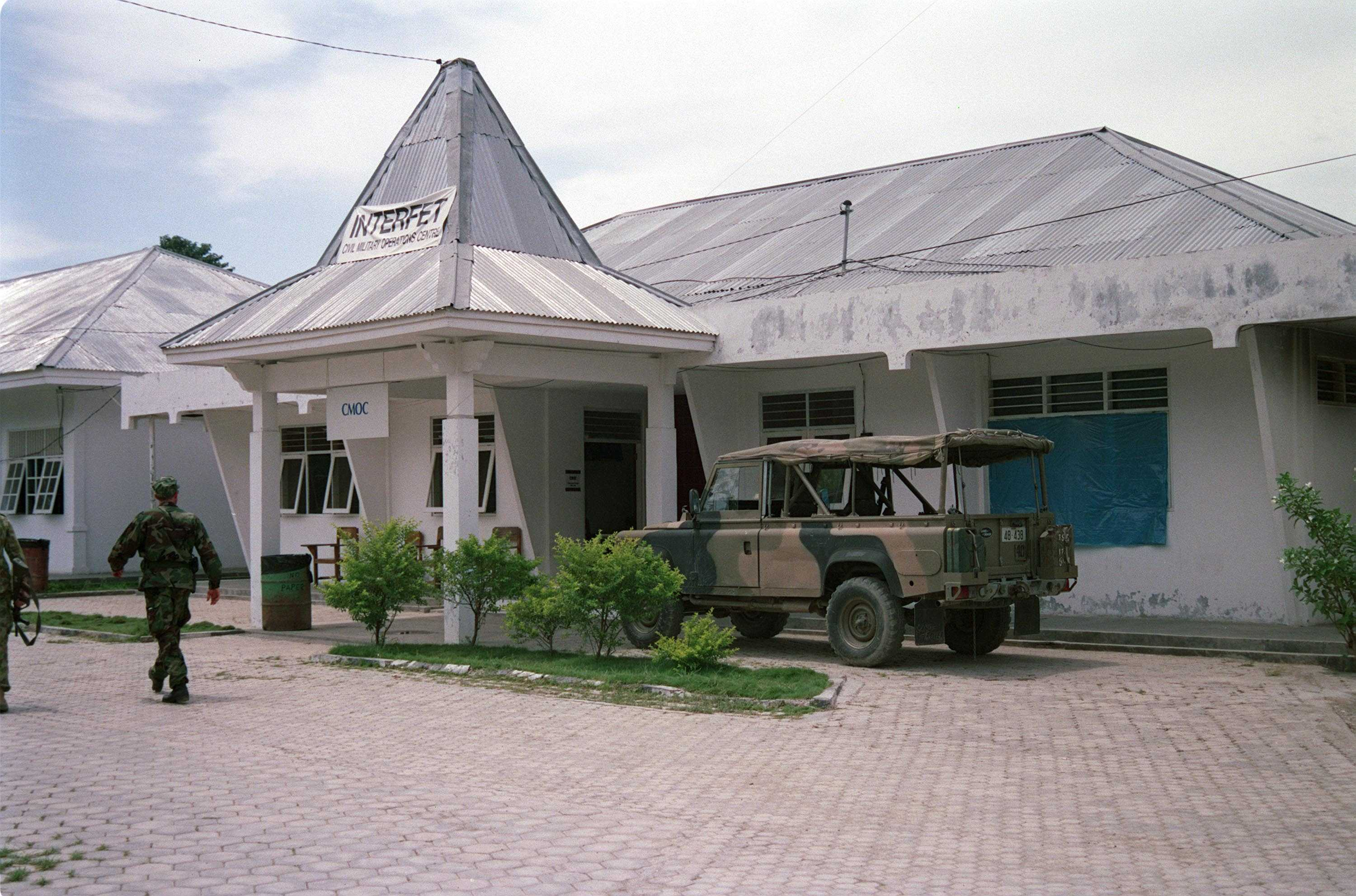
Civil Military Operations Centre INTERFET headquarters in Dili in February 2000

Over 72,000 civilians had returned to Dili by early October, mainly from the surrounding area, but increasingly from further afield. The Dili stadium became the focal point for the delivery of humanitarian aid. Techniques honed in Operation Solace, the Australian intervention in Somalia in 1992–1993, were employed to avoid disturbances at food distribution points. Lieutenant Colonel Joe Ison, USA, an experienced civil affairs officer from B Company, 96th Civil Affairs Battalion, which was normally based at Fort Bragg, North Carolina, established a Civil Military Operations Centre (CMOC) in Dili on 25 September. His ten-person team was augmented with Australians from INTERFET HQ. He coordinated relief efforts with the United Nations High Commissioner for Refugees, UNICEF, World Food Programme, Red Cross, Oxfam and other agencies. In early November his team were replaced by a detachment from the 322nd Civil Affairs Brigade from Hawaii. When the 3rd Brigade moved to the border areas adjoining West Timor, agencies struggled to supply aid to the people there. One relief organisation representative told a CMOC meeting that it would take two months for his only truck to move 6 tonnes (5.9 long tons) of supplies to Suai on East Timor's south coast, assuming that monsoonal rains did not wash the roads away. Two CH-53s moved his supplies in one afternoon.

=== Postal ===
Some members of the 10th Force Support Battalion had prior active service in Rwanda and Bougainville, but the volume of mail received in East Timor came as a surprise. Delivered to Australian Field Post Office (AFPO) 5 in Dili by forklift on large metal RAAF L pallets, the volume of mail increased from 250 kilograms (550 lb) a day on October to 12 tonnes (13 short tons) per day in early November. As Christmas approached, families and friends of ADF personnel took advantage of the Australian government's offer of free mail delivery, and from mid-November the volume of mail increased to 37 tonnes (41 short tons) per day. Jervis Bay was employed to fetch the incoming mail from Darwin three times a week. Outgoing mail was dispatched to Australia seven days a week. As a result, the postal unit found themselves working from 14 to 16 hours a day.

=== Coalition logistics ===
At its peak, INTERFET had 11,693 personnel from 23 countries. Of these 5,697 were from Australia, making it the largest deployment of Australian forces overseas since the Vietnam War. But, as Major Bronwyn Worswick, the legal officer at FLSG, noted, "our logistics system is set up to supply us. It's not set up to supply and sell basically to other countries". When operations commenced, formal arrangements regarding logistical support were in place only with the United Kingdom and New Zealand. Contingents therefore arrived without a clear idea of what they would be called upon to pay for, creating the potential for fractures in the coalition over supplies and their cost recovery.

While there was a requirement for INTERFET to account for all stores issued for later cost recovery, FLSG adopted a policy that rigid accounting was not required from New Zealand, as they were such close allies. The two nations shared a similar operational culture, in that immediate operational needs were considered paramount, and worrying about the details could be left for later. This culture was not shared by ASEAN nations, who wanted their logistical support provided on a commercial basis. Some contingents attempted to run a cash-based economy, paying for minor items at the point of acquisition. The South Korean force went so far as to seek financial compensation for the late delivery of rations. Australian fuel pumps did not have meters on them, so it was difficult to measure how much fuel was provided to contingents. Nor were there procedures in place for capturing the labour and materials required in servicing vehicles; these had to be developed in-theatre.

In the Guidelines for Force Contributing Nations, contingents were asked to arrive in Australia self-sufficient for forty-two days. This proved to be little more than a vain hope. Some contingents, taking advantage of the speed at which the Australians had assembled the coalition, arrived with little or no logistical support, which they expected Australia to provide in its role as the lead nation. Crucial financial assistance came from Japan, which donated over USD$100 million. Due to the limitations of the Australian computer systems, it was not until September 2000 that the ADF's costs in supporting INTERFET could be tallied, which hampered Australian claims for reimbursement from the UN INTERFET Trust Fund.

== End of mission ==
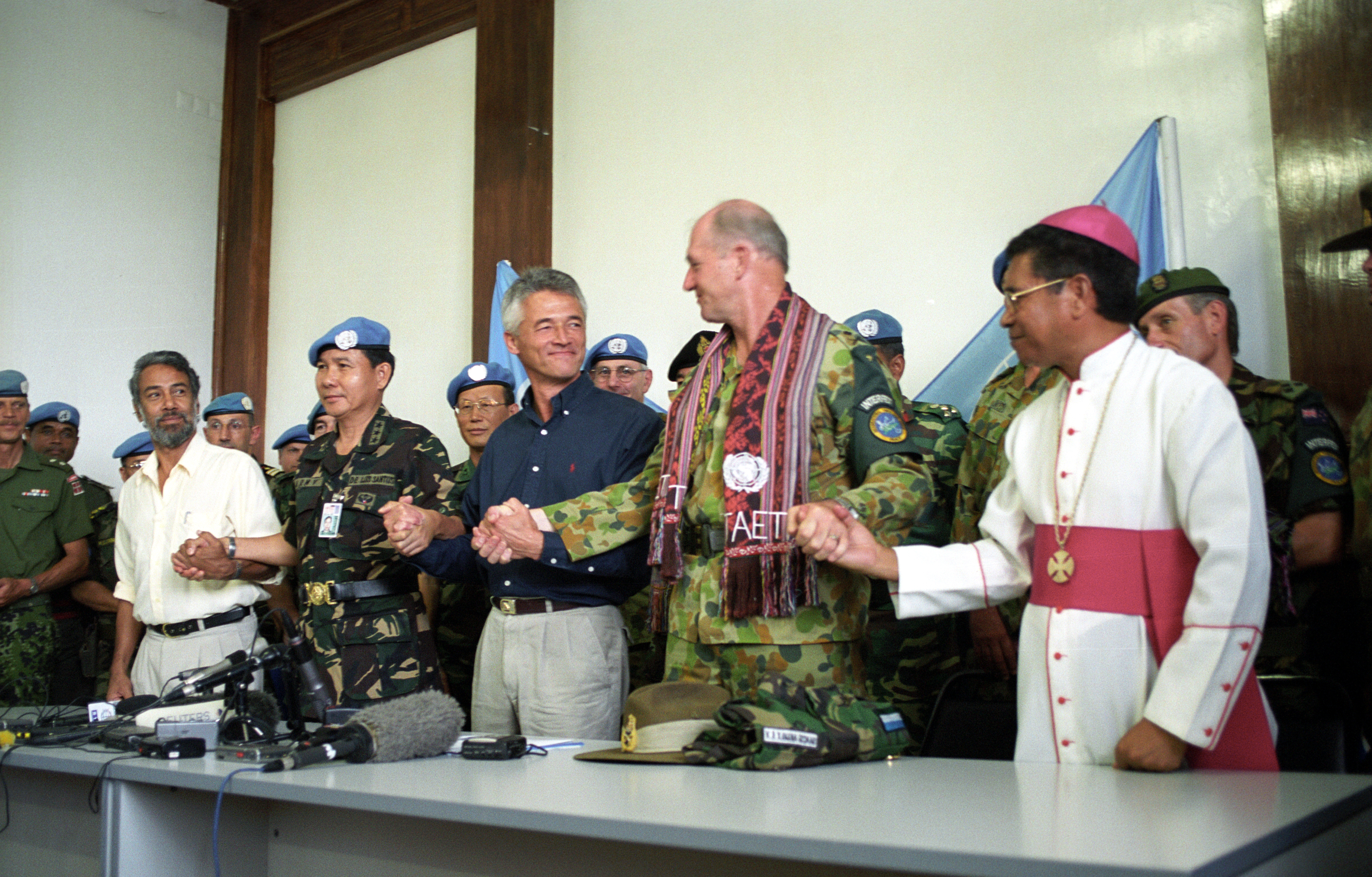
Cosgrove joins hands with the new East Timor leadership during a celebration to mark the official handover from INTERFET to UNTAET

Indonesia recognised East Timor as an independent nation on 19 October 1999, and TNI forces withdrew on 31 October, leaving INTERFET in charge. Between 1 and 23 February 2000 it transferred responsibility for the administration of East Timor to the United Nations Transitional Administration in East Timor (UNTAET). On 20 February 2000, the 10th Force Support Battalion handed over responsibility for support of the forces in East Timor, along with its few remaining personnel there, to the 9th Force Support Battalion. Australian logistical support was still required until UNTAET could stand on its own feet, and logistical handover to UNTAET was not completed until 1 July 2000.

== Retrospect ==
For Australia, the East Timor intervention revealed serious deficiencies in its logistical capabilities. There was no joint logistics doctrine, and the Army, RAN and RAAF had not practised joint logistical operations in support of joint task forces. Important equipment such as ship-to-shore refuelling capability was lacking, and there were insufficient forklifts and trailers to move shipping containers. There were skills shortages in critical areas such as air and water terminal operations, petroleum distribution, supply clerks, medical specialists and cooks. The notion that the ADF could shop for supplies like any other consumer was disproved, warehouses being unable to cope with sudden demands for personal items, stores, equipment and spare parts. US military aircraft had to fly in helmets and flak jackets from US sources. The logistical computer systems were designed to track cargo movements from one base to another in Australia, not to deployed forces. Personnel systems were not automated, and there were four cases of underage personnel being sent to East Timor. It took 54 days before Support Command was ready to assume responsibility for East Timor.

Wilkinson described the support of operations in East Timor as a logistics environment that was about "as easy as it gets". The theatre of operations was close to Australia; the area involved and the forces deployed were relatively small; there was no high-level combat; and logistical units could perform their duties unhampered by enemy action. The situation stabilised once INTERFET boots were on the ground, and the overburdened logistical system was not overwhelmed by urgent requests for high volumes of ammunition and other combat supplies. Whether by good luck or good management, Cosgrove had the resources he needed to carry out his mission without severe limitations resulting from inadequate logistics. While the troops had good reason to be critical of a lack of spare parts, medical supplies and amenities, "on balance", historian Bob Breen concluded, "Australians are harder on their logistical system than most nationalities and receive support that many other nationalities could only dream about."
