= No. 96 Wing RAAF =

- Active: 2014–current
- Country: Australia
- Branch: Royal Australian Air Force
- Part of: Combat Support Group
- Headquarters: RAAF Base Amberley
- Motto: Steadfast in Support

No. 96 Wing (96WG) is a fixed-base support wing of the Royal Australian Air Force (RAAF). 96WG was formed out of the No 396 Combat Support Wing, which was formed on 20 November 2000. 96WG itself was re-designated as No. 96 Wing on 1 January 2014 as part of a 'staged restructuring.' In December 2001, a major restructuring transferred most Health Services Flights to a separate command structure, while Darwin, Townsville, and Butterworth remained under the command of No. 396.
