= No. 321 Expeditionary Combat Support Squadron RAAF =

321 Expeditionary Combat Support Squadron
- Active: 1 January 2007 – 1 July 2010
- Disbanded: 1 July 2010
- Branch: RAAF
- Part of: 396ECSW
- Garrison/HQ: RAAF Base Darwin

No. 321 Expeditionary Combat Support Squadron (322ECSS) was a Royal Australian Air Force (RAAF) ground support squadron based at RAAF Base Darwin near Darwin, Northern Territory.

Along with other northern ECSS it was formed after the disbanding of 386ECSS at RAAF Richmond in 2006.

On 1 July 2010 changes to the structure of the Combat Support Group resulted in the functions of 321ECSS being integrated with No. 13 (City of Darwin) Squadron at RAAF Darwin and 321ECSS being disbanded.
