= No. 382 Expeditionary Combat Support Squadron RAAF =

382 Expeditionary Combat Support Squadron
- Active: 1998
- Branch: RAAF
- Part of: 395ECSW
- Garrison/HQ: RAAF Base Amberley
- Motto(s): Decisive Combat Support

The No. 382 Expeditionary Combat Support Squadron RAAF (382ECSS) was a Royal Australian Air Force combat support squadron established in 1998, and based at the RAAF Base Amberley, southwest of Ipswich, Queensland. It is a fully deployable unit which provides operational support to a forward operating base. Although its usual role was to supplement base services at RAAF Base Amberley, it had the capability to deploy to bare base and provide all the services to make it a fully operational base.

In 1999, the 382 Expeditionary Combat Support Squadron spent three months with Peacekeeping forces in East Timor. The squadron repaired the Cakung airfield, the only airfield in East Timor capable of taking wide-body aircraft, which was vandalised when the Indonesian military left East Timor. Once the 382 Expeditionary Combat Support Squadron repaired the airfield, it was used as entry point for Interfet and humanitarian personnel and assistance.

In 2003, the Australian Defence Force commenced a $1 billion upgrade of its fleet of trucks, trailers and motorbikes, and the 382 Expeditionary Combat Squadron was chosen to receive the initial roll-out of the replacement fleet. The new vehicles included trailers used for transporting personnel and supplies, evacuating casualties, and communication systems.

The 382 Expeditionary Combat Support Squadron helped with cleanup efforts in The Gap in Queensland after 16 November, 2008, storms wreaked havoc on the area. In 2007 they spent 39 weeks in the Middle East.

On 1 July 2010 changes to the structure of the Combat Support Group resulted in the functions of 382ECSS being integrated with No. 23 (City of Brisbane) Squadron at RAAF Amberley and 382ECSS being expanded to provide all support elements require by 23 SQN.
