= No. 13 Squadron RAAF =

Royal Australian Air Force squadron

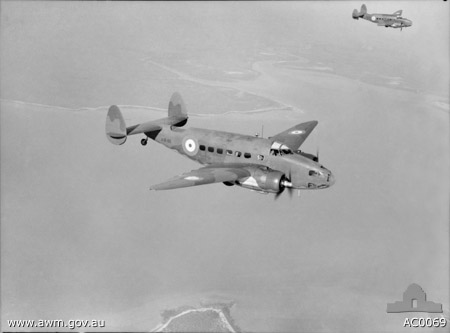
- Two Hudson aircraft from No. 13 Squadron near Darwin in 1940
- Active: 1 June 1940 – 11 January 1946; 1 July 1989 – current
- Branch: Royal Australian Air Force
- Role: Base operations and training
- Part of: Combat Support Group
- Garrison/HQ: RAAF Base Darwin
- Mottos: "Resilient and Ready"

Commanders
- Notable commanders: John Balmer (1940–1941)

No. 13 (City of Darwin) Squadron is a Royal Australian Air Force (RAAF) squadron. The unit saw combat during World War II as a bomber and maritime patrol squadron and is currently active as a mixed regular and reserve RAAF unit located in Darwin, fulfilling both operational support and training duties.

== History ==
=== World War II ===
No. 13 Squadron was formed from elements of No. 12 Squadron at RAAF Station Darwin on 1 June 1940. Its first commanding officer was Wing Commander John Balmer. The squadron initially operated Avro Ansons in the general reconnaissance role and flew maritime surveillance patrols over the seas to the north of Australia and survey flights over northern Australia. The squadron was re-equipped with Lockheed Hudson light bombers, suffering its first loss in September when an aircraft was destroyed on take-off. In early 1941, the squadron was tasked with locating a German commerce raider and a U-boat, before joining the search for survivors from HMAS Sydney following its battle with the German auxiliary cruiser Kormoran. In May 1941, the squadron began familiarisation flights over the Netherlands East Indies in preparation for deploying to the NEI following the outbreak of war with Japan.

On 7 December 1941, the day before the start of the Pacific War—the position of the International Date Line meant this was actually a day before the famous attack on Pearl Harbor, only with the same date—No. 13 Squadron deployed two flights of Hudsons (a total of six aircraft) to Ambon, where they were based at Laha Airfield in the NEI. The squadron's operations record book for 8 December 1941 recorded that: "At the outbreak of war with Japan the Squadron's Aircraft strength was 12 Hudsons, of which six were operating from Laha, NEI. The remainder of the Aircraft were left at Darwin pending the executive from higher authority to proceed to Namlea, NEI." Three days later, the squadron's commander, Wing Commander Joshua McDonald, was killed in an accident; Squadron Leader John Ryland took over and shortly afterwards the squadron deployed its third flight to Namlea Airfield on Buru Island. At the end of the month, the third flight moved to Babo in Dutch New Guinea. Flying in the face of heavy resistance, and lacking fighter support, the squadron's aircraft conducted operations throughout the eastern islands of the NEI, during which several aircraft were lost. Others were also destroyed on the ground as Japanese aircraft attacked Laha. The surviving aircraft from these flights returned to Darwin in February 1942, as Ambon faced invasion.

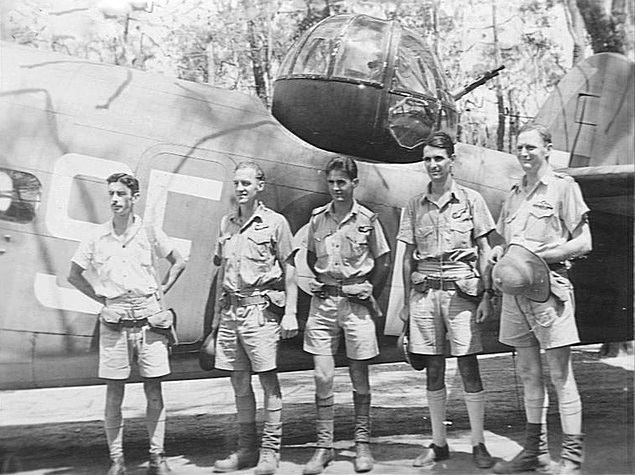
Aircrew of No. 13 Squadron beside their Hudson bomber at Hughes, Northern Territory, in 1943

No. 13 Squadron was severely affected by the Japanese air raids on Darwin on 19 February 1942, the squadron's headquarters, stores and spares being destroyed. Its aircraft were undamaged, having been moved inland to Daly Waters the previous week, or over Timor on task. In March, No. 13 Squadron moved to Hughes Airfield. As a result of the squadron's heavy losses during the defence of the NEI and the raids on Darwin, No. 13 Squadron generally only had one or two aircraft operational on most days in early 1942. Nevertheless, the squadron continued to fly operational attack and reconnaissance missions over the NEI, including an anti-shipping raid around Beco, in Timor, on 10 August 1942, sinking Japanese netlayer Fukuei Maru No. 15 and damaged another in a mast-height attack that was launched in response from intelligence information provided by Australian commandos deployed on the island as part of Sparrow Force. No. 13 Squadron was later awarded the United States Presidential Unit Citation for its operations over Timor during August and September 1942; it is one of only two RAAF squadrons to have received this honour, the other unit being No. 2 Squadron for its performance in the Vietnam War.

The squadron continued to conduct operations against the Japanese until 4 April 1943, when it handed over its Hudsons to No. 2 Squadron and was withdrawn to RAAF Base Fairbairn to rest and re-equip. At Fairbairn the squadron took delivery of Bristol Beaufort and Lockheed Ventura aircraft and conducted anti-submarine and shipping patrols along the Australian east coast. The Beauforts were handed over to No. 2 Squadron in August. The future Australian prime minister Gough Whitlam served with the squadron as a navigator from 2 August 1943 until February 1945.

No. 13 Squadron moved to Cooktown, north-eastern Queensland, in late May 1944 before moving again to Gove, Northern Territory, in August; from there it mainly carried out anti-submarine and escort patrols, though it also mounted a small number of bombing raids against the eastern islands of the NEI. In late June 1945, the squadron moved to Morotai in the NEI and, soon after the end of the war, to Labuan in British North Borneo. From Labuan the squadron operated in the transport role and ferried ex-prisoners of war and other personnel back to Australia before being disbanded on 11 January 1946. Casualties during the war amounted to 87 personnel killed.

=== Reformation ===
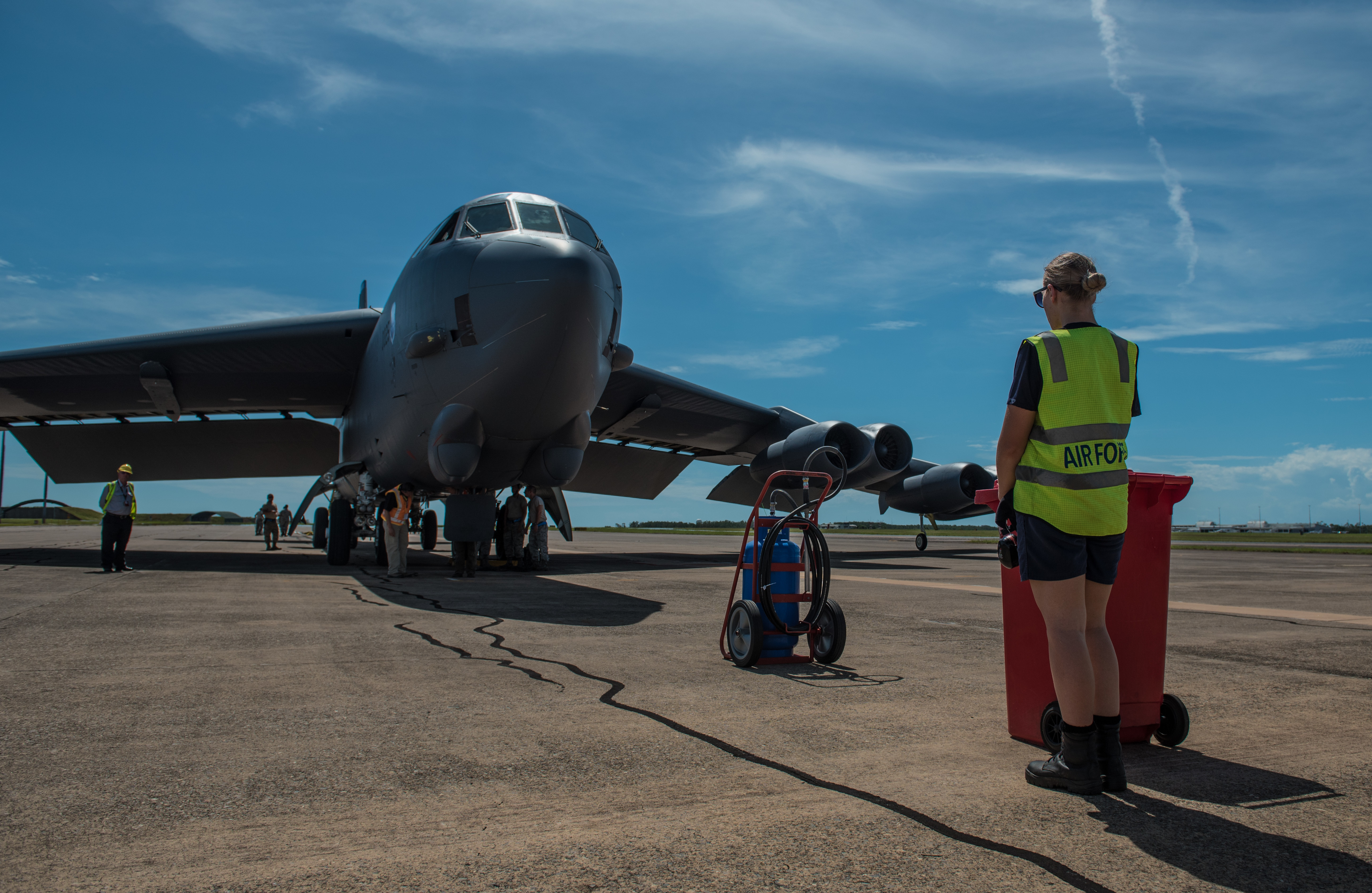
A member of No. 13 Squadron standing by a USAF Boeing B-52 Stratofortress with a bioenvironmental security kit in 2018

No. 13 Squadron was re-formed as a non-flying Active Reserve squadron located at RAAF Base Darwin on 1 July 1989; later that month it was conferred with the title "No. 13 (City of Darwin) Squadron". On 31 May 1990, the squadron was officially presented the Presidential Unit Citation it had been awarded in 1942. On 1 July 2010, changes to the structure of the Combat Support Group resulted in the combat support and fixed-base services functions of No. 321 Expeditionary Combat Support Squadron (321 ECSS) being integrated with No. 13 Squadron at Darwin and 321 ECSS being disbanded.

== Commanding Officers ==
The following officers commanded No. 13 Squadron between 1940 and 1946:

- Wing Commander John Balmer
- Graham Barton
- Robert Holmes
- Lyle Holswich
- William Keenan
- Wing Commander Joshua McDonald
- Ralph Moran
- Peter Parker
- Squadron Leader John Ryland
- John Whyte
- Frederick Wittscheibe

== Base locations ==
The squadron's bases have included:

- Darwin: 1 June 1940 – 6 December 1941
- Laha: 6 December 1941 – 31 January 1942
- Darwin: 31 January 1942 – 2 May 1942
- Hughes: 2 May 1942 – 19 April 1943
- Unknown: 20 April 1943 – 24 August 1944
- Gove: 25 August 1944 – 26 June 1945
- Transit to Borneo, via Morotai: 27 June 1945 – 14 July 1945
- Labuan, Borneo, 15 July 1945 – 11 January 1946

== Aircraft operated ==
No. 13 Squadron operated the following aircraft:

- Avro Anson (June 1940)
- Lockheed Hudson (June 1940 – April 1943)
- Bristol Beaufort (April–August 1943)
- Lockheed Ventura (April 1943 – January 1946)
