= RAAF Base Darwin =

Airport in Darwin, Northern Territory, Australia

- Darwin, Northern Territory in Australia
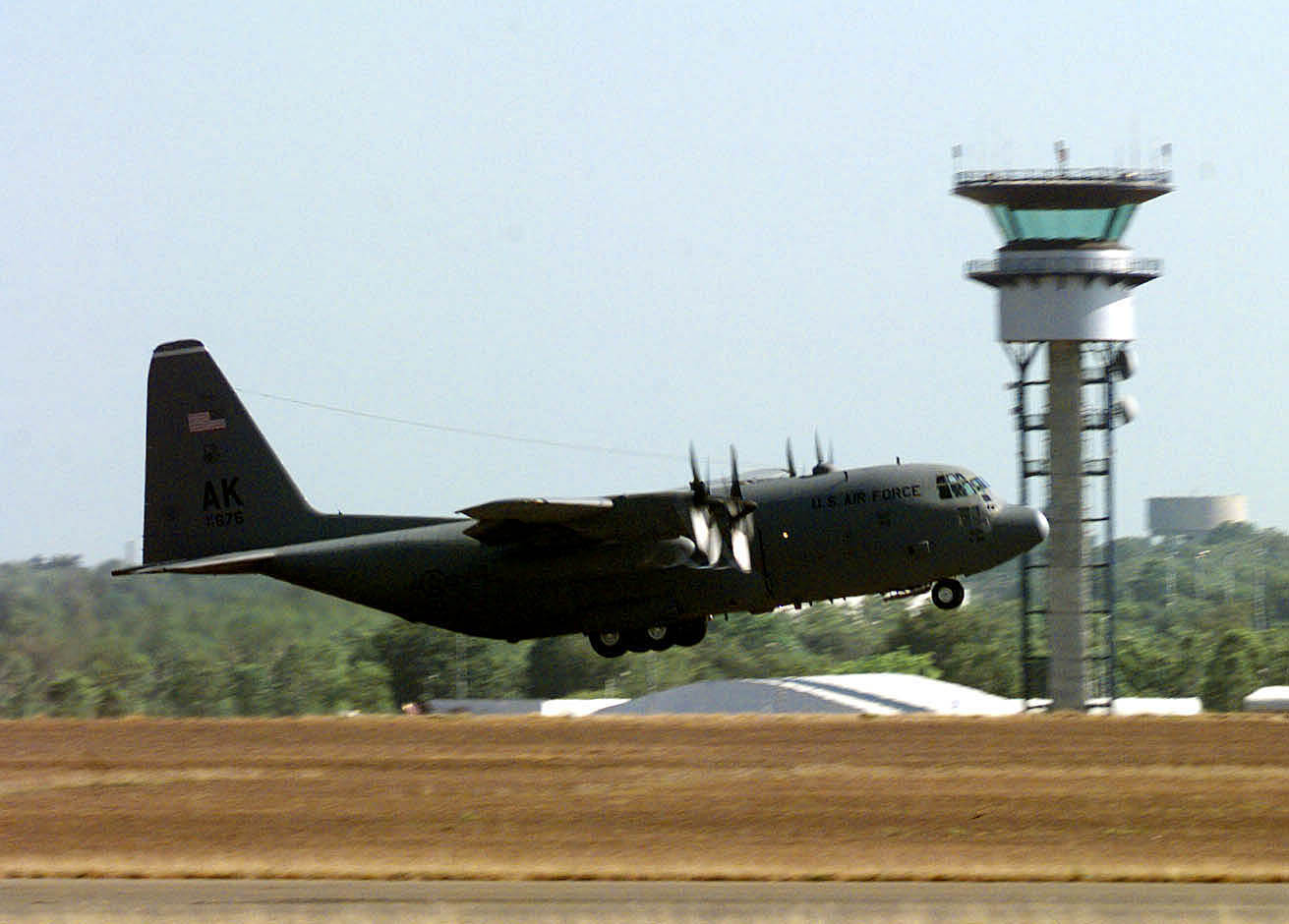
- A USAF C-130 taking off from RAAF Base Darwin in 1999

Site information
- Type: Military airfield
- Owner: Department of Defence
- Operator: Royal Australian Air Force
- Website: RAAF Base Darwin

Location
- Location in the Northern Territory
- Coordinates: 12°24′53″S 130°52′36″E

Site history
- In use: 1 June 1940 – present
- Battles/wars: Bombing of Darwin, World War II

Garrison information
- Occupants: No. 452 Squadron Darwin Flight; No. 92 Wing Detachment B; No. 114 Mobile Control and Reporting Unit; Headquarters No. 396 Combat Support Wing; No. 321 Expeditionary Combat Support Squadron; No. 1 Air Terminal Squadron Detachment Darwin; No 13 (City of Darwin) Squadron; 2 Security forces Squadron Detachment Darwin

Airfield information
- Identifiers: IATA: DRW, ICAO: YPDN
- Elevation: 31 metres (103 ft) AMSL
Runways
Direction	Length and surface
11/29	3,354 metres (11,004 ft) Asphalt
18/36	1,524 metres (5,000 ft) Asphalt
- Sources: Australian AIP and aerodrome chart

RAAF Base Darwin (IATA: DRW, ICAO: YPDN) is a Royal Australian Air Force (RAAF) military air base located in the city of Darwin, in the Northern Territory, Australia. The base shares its runway with Darwin International Airport, for civil aviation purposes. The heritage-listed RAAF Base Darwin is a forward operating base with year-round activity with approximately 400 personnel.

== History ==
Construction of the airfield began in 1938 and RAAF Station Darwin was established on 1 June 1940, from elements of No. 12 Squadron RAAF. No. 13 Squadron RAAF was also created at the same time and was based at the base. Charles Eaton was the first Commanding Officer between 1940 and 1941. No. 12 Squadron RAAF relocated from Parap Airfield, Northern Territory in April 1941 to RAAF Station Darwin. The base hosted a large number of RAAF and United States Army Air Forces (USAAF) units during World War II. The base was bombed by Japanese forces many times, beginning with two major air raids on 19 February 1942.

Parts of the 45-hectare (110-acre) site are listed on the Commonwealth Heritage List, since 2004, with the citation stating:

RAAF Base Darwin is historically significant for its direct association with the defence build up in Darwin in the period immediately before WWII. The base illustrates a change in Australian Defence policy with the Federal Government establishing a major military presence in the north of Australia. Importantly this action was material evidence of the development by Australia of an independent strategic policy in the years preceding WWII. The large scale of the base demonstrates the significance of the governments commitment to such a policy, and the scale of the perceived threat. This military development greatly accelerated Darwin's own development as a major centre in northern Australia.

The heritage items include several timber-framed and fibrous-cement clad houses, the timber-framed Sergeants Mess and Single Officer's Mess, the former Airmen's Mess, the Administrative Building, the Gymnasium and Canteen building, the Commanding Officers' Residence, the non-denominational chapel, the water tower, Guard House, the timber-framed School of Instruction, and various other residential quarters.

=== Units based at RAAF Darwin during World War II ===
- No. 12 Squadron RAAF
- No. 13 Squadron RAAF
- No. 34 Squadron RAAF

During World War II RAAF Base Darwin served as a first refuge for retreating USAAF units from the Philippines in 1941. The USAAF Far East Air Force and its subordinate commands, V Fighter and V Bomber established headquarters at Darwin in late December 1941. Later, the USAAF 49th Fighter Group and other units were assigned to Darwin before moving north to forward bases in 1943. From 9 August 1944 to 20 February 1945 the USAAF 380th Bombardment Group based four squadrons of long-range B-24 Liberator bombers at the base. From Darwin, the group received a Distinguished Unit Citation for a series of long-range attacks on oil refineries, shipping, and dock facilities in Balikpapan, Borneo, in August 1943. The unit repeatedly bombed enemy airfields in western New Guinea during April and May 1944 in support of American landings in the Hollandia area, being awarded another DUC for this action. Moved in February 1945 to Mindoro in the Philippines.

In 1975, during the aftermath of Cyclone Tracy, the base was the centre of the largest airlift in Australian history in which the majority of Darwin's inhabitants were evacuated.

The base was an emergency landing site for the NASA Space Shuttle due to the length of its runway. United States Air Force (USAF) B-1 Lancer and B-52 Stratofortress bombers, as well as KC-10 and KC-135 tankers can operate from RAAF Base Darwin.

In 2010 it was reported that some houses near the base required extra sound proofing to deal with the extreme sound levels of the low observable Joint Strike Fighter.

== Current units ==
Unit name	Force Element Group	Aircraft/equipment
Headquarters No. 452 Squadron	Surveillance and Response Group	
No. 452 Squadron Darwin Flight	Surveillance and Response Group	
No. 92 Wing Detachment B	Surveillance and Response Group	AP-3C Orion
No. 114 Mobile Control and Reporting Unit	Surveillance and Response Group	AN/FPS-117 radar
Headquarters No. 396 Combat Support Wing	Combat Support Group	
No. 321 Expeditionary Combat Support Squadron	Combat Support Group	
No. 1 Air Terminal Squadron Detachment Darwin	Combat Support Group	
No 13 (City of Darwin) Squadron	Combat Support Group (RAAF Active Reserve)	

== Gallery ==
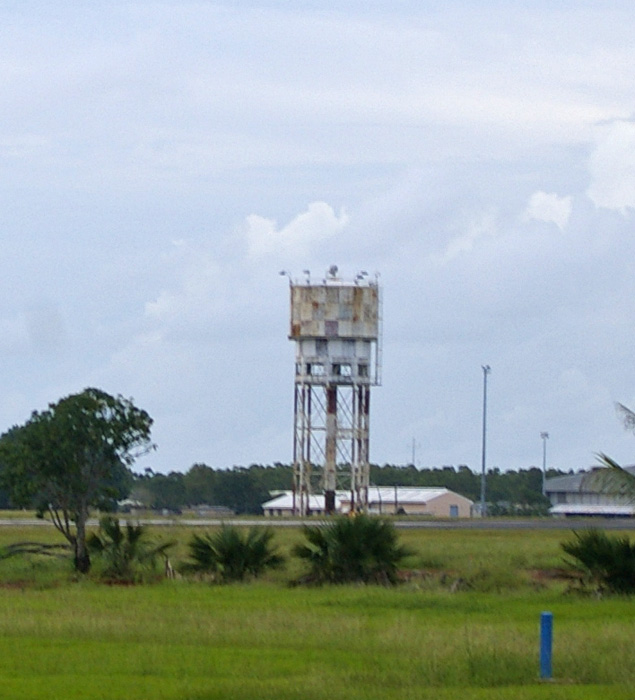
Former RAAF Base Darwin Control and Water Tower

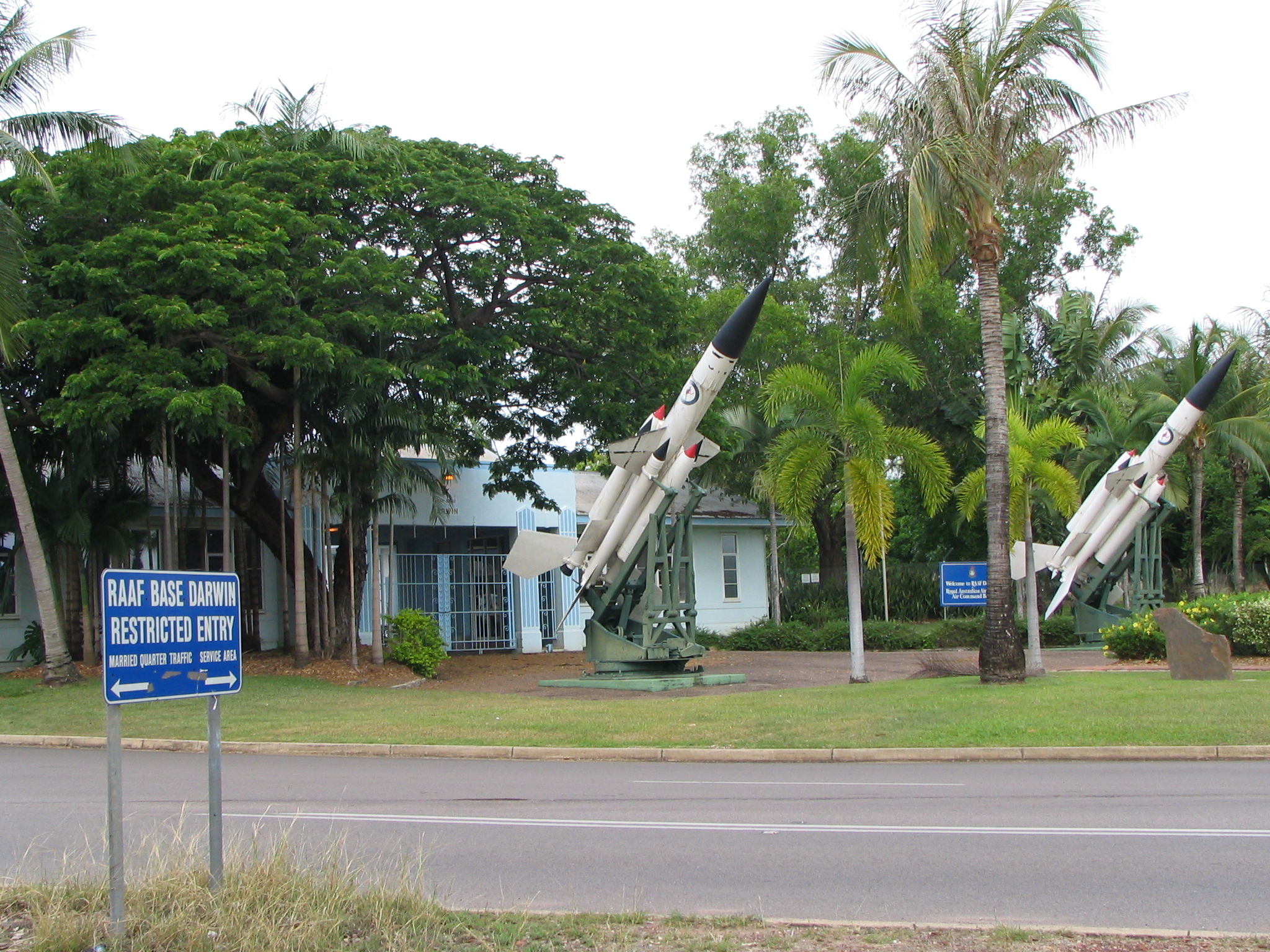
RAAF Base Darwin's main gate

== See also ==
- United States Army Air Forces in Australia (Lists all United States airbases during World War II)
- List of airports in the Northern Territory
- List of Royal Australian Air Force installations
- Marine Rotational Force - Darwin
