= No. 1 Airfield Operations Support Squadron RAAF =

No. 1 Airfield Operations Support Squadron
- Active: 1966–
- Branch: Royal Australian Air Force
- Part of: No. 395 Expeditionary Combat Support Wing RAAF
- Garrison/HQ: RAAF Base Townsville
- Motto(s): Strike Further

No. 1 Airfield Operations Support Squadron (1AOSS) is Headquartered at RAAF Base Townsville. The squadron has detachments at each of the major RAAF Bases around Australia. It is responsible for providing fixed-base and expeditionary Air Movements support, Explosive Ordnance Disposal (EOD) functions, Airfield Engineering, including vertical and horizontal construction capabilities, and 3rd line logistics support to the RAAF's Expeditionary Combat Support Squadrons.

Number 1 Airfield Operations Support Squadron was originally formed on 14 May 1966 as Base Support Flight (BASUPFLT), and the main body departed Sydney on 12 June 1966, via civil air, to Vietnam and Vung Tau where it operated in direct support to Number 35 Squadron. On 19 September 1968, the unit was renamed No. 1 Operational Support Unit (1OSU). On return to Australia in 1972 the unit was disbanded only to be reformed 12 years later at RAAF Richmond. The unit operated as a cadre of 10-12 specialists who rapidly re-developed new capabilities to support bare base and tactical deployments across Australia. Inducting assigned personnel through rapid training in preparation for almost non-stop multi- force exercises and humanitarian aid projects. Having built its capabilities The unit was assigned to its first major international peacekeeping task in East Timor.

As part of this transition it relocated to share facilities with No. 7 Stores Depot in Toowoomba, before eventually relocating in 1992 to new facilities at RAAF Townsville. Not long after arrival the unit was renamed as No. 1 Combat Logistics Squadron (1CLS).

On 1 January 2007 the unit merged with No. 1 Air Terminal Squadron (1ATS) to form into the unit it is today. 1AOSS is currently the most diverse and dispersed unit in the RAAF, with an approximate staff of 470 permanent, reserve and civilian personnel serving at 9 permanent detachments at bases all around Australia.
