= No. 396 Expeditionary Combat Support Wing RAAF =

- No. 396ECSW's crest
- Active: ?–2010
- Country: Australia
- Branch: Royal Australian Air Force
- Part of: Combat Support Group
- Headquarters: RAAF Base Darwin
- Motto(s): Steadfast in Support

No. 396 Expeditionary Combat Support Wing (396 ECSW) was a ground support wing of the Royal Australian Air Force (RAAF). Part of the Combat Support Group, it was responsible for the provision of combat and base support services and maintained the RAAF's "bare bases" at Weipa, Exmouth and Derby in the northern part of Australia's airspace. The wing consisted of three expeditionary combat support squadrons, one combat support squadron, an operations support squadron, a combat logistics squadron and two support units, which were located at various bases all around Australia, and in Malaysia at RMAF Butterworth.
