= No. 395 Expeditionary Combat Support Wing RAAF =

395ECSW
- Active: 1998–present
- Country: Australia
- Branch: Royal Australian Air Force
- Part of: Combat Support Group
- Garrison/HQ: RAAF Base Amberley
- Motto(s): Expeditionary Support

No 395 Expeditionary Combat Support Wing (395 ECSW) is a ground support wing of the Royal Australian Air Force (RAAF). Part of the Combat Support Group, it is responsible for the provision of combat and base support services, including command and control of airbases and airspace, force protection, communications and logistics. Consisting of 11 sub units, it is one of the largest RAAF units and is made up of one Combat Communications Squadron, two Expeditionary Combat Support Squadrons, two Security Forces Squadrons and seven Combat Support Units which are based at various locations around Australia.
