= Combat Support Group RAAF =

Force element group of the Royal Australian Air Force

Combat Support Group
- Active: Formed 18 May 1998
- Branch: RAAF
- Part of: Air Command
- Garrison/HQ: RAAF Base Amberley

Commanders
- Current commander: AIRCDRE “Dubbo” Graham

The Combat Support Group (CSG) is a component of the Royal Australian Air Force (RAAF), established in 1998, initially known as the Operational Support Group (OSG). The CSG's primary objective is to coordinate military airbases and squadrons within Australia. While its initial focus was on general operations, its purpose has evolved to encompass a broader range of military applications, leading to the change in nomenclature.

At present, the CSG operates on a centralised control model, complemented by decentralised execution, enabling it to provide essential military airbase capabilities. The group collaborates with wings and squadrons situated across various locations within Australia, ensuring the provision of necessary support for Australian Defence Force (ADF) operations in the Asia-Pacific region.

Throughout its history, the CSG has actively participated in ADF operations, including deployments to regions such as the Solomon Islands, East Timor, Afghanistan, and Iraq. The group has also played a pivotal role in offering Forward Control System (FCS) capabilities for Australian humanitarian missions.

Overall, the Combat Support Group contributes significantly to enhancing the operational effectiveness and support capabilities of the Royal Australian Air Force, reinforcing its commitment to regional security and national interests.

== Subordinate Units ==
As of 2017, Combat Support Group's main subordinate units were:

- No. 95 Wing RAAF
- No. 96 Wing RAAF
- Health Services Wing RAAF
- Combat Support Division
