= Structure of the Royal Australian Air Force =

The Royal Australian Air Force is organised into a number of operational, support and training formations located at bases across Australia.

Circa 1998, composite wings in the 95-97 series range were reported to be formed if necessary for operations overseas. In the event, No. 97 Wing RAAF was established on 24 October 1997 to command the RAAF elements deployed for drought relief purposes to Papua New Guinea during Operation Ples Drai. It was led by Wing Commander Chris Richards, who was also the commander of the Air Component of Joint Task Force 105 which had been established for this operation.

== Air Force structure ==
=== Formations ===
FORMATION	COMMANDER	RANK
Air Force	Chief of Air Force (CAF)	Air Marshal
Air Force Headquarters/HQ Air Command	DCAF/Air Commander	Air Vice Marshal
Force Element Group/Branch	Commander/Director General	Air Commodore
Wing/Directorate	Officer Commanding/Director	Group Captain/EL2
Squadron/Unit/Department	Commanding officer/deputy director/senior manager	Wing commander/EL1
Flight	Flight commander/manager	Squadron leader/APS6flight lieutenant/APS5*
Section	Officer in charge/coordinator	Junior officer~/SNCO/APS1-4

Note: Only select formations as promulgated by CAF are designated as official command (Military) or directorial (APS) appointments

*Rank/Title depends on size/complexity/purpose of the formation
~A junior officer of the Air Force is a pilot officer(O1), flying officer (O2) or flight lieutenant (O3). Air Force warrant officers (WOFF/E9) hold similar standing to a flying officer or flight lieutenant - depending on time/experience in rank.
- ~Air Force public servant non-executive leaders, depending on roles, are designated as; Manager FLTLT(APS5)/SQNLDR(APS6) responsibility depending on size/complexity), Coordinators WOFF(APS4)/FLGOFF(APS4) responsibility), and Officer (APS4 - FSGT/PLTOFF responsibility)
  - Air Force senior officers are squadron leader (APS6/O4), wing commander (EL1/O5), group captain (EL2/O6).
  - ~Air Force executive public servant officers are designated senior managers or deputy directors (EL1/O5), director (EL2) or executive director (EL2.1/O6) depending on role and level of responsibilities.
Air Force 'air officers' (flag rank (navy), general rank (army) are air commodore (1*), air vice marshal (2*), air marshal (3*) and air chief marshal (4*).
Air Force public servants of equivalent air officer rank are; (1*) - SES band-1/assistant secretary, (2*) - SES band-2/first assistant secretary, deputy secretary (DEPSEC - 3*), and secretary (SEC - 4*)

=== Other appointments ===
- Chief of the Defence Force (CDF) – Air Chief Marshal (when RAAF officer)
- Vice Chief of the Defence Force (VCDF) – Air Marshal (when RAAF officer)
- Chief of Joint Operations (CJOPS) – Air Marshal (when RAAF officer)
- Chief Capability Development Group (CCDG) – Air Marshal (when RAAF officer)
- Deputy Chief of Air Force (DCAF) – Air Vice Marshal
- Commander Integrated Air Defence System (CDR IADS) – Air Vice Marshal
- Deputy Chief of Joint Operations (DCJOPS)/Chief of Staff Headquarters Joint Operations Command (COS HQJOC) – Air Vice Marshal (when RAAF officer)
- Chief Joint Logistics (CJLOG) – Air Vice Marshal (when RAAF officer)
- Chief Information Officer (CIO) – Air Vice Marshal (when RAAF officer)
- Commander Joint Health (CJHLTH)- Air Vice Marshal (when RAAF officer)

== Air Force Headquarters ==
UNIT	FULL NAME	LOCATION	AIRCRAFT
CAF	Office of the Chief of Air Force	Russell Offices
WOFF-AF	Warrant Officer of the Air Force	Russell Offices
AFHQ	Air Force Headquarters	Russell Offices
28SQN	No. 28 Squadron	HMAS Harman, Canberra
== Air Command ==
HQAC	Headquarters Air Command	RAAF Base Glenbrook
=== Air Combat Group ===
UNIT	FULL NAME	LOCATION	EQUIPMENT
HQACG	Headquarters Air Combat Group	RAAF Base Williamtown
78 Wing
HQ78WG	Headquarters No. 78 Wing	RAAF Base Williamtown
76SQN	No. 76 Squadron	RAAF Base Williamtown	BAe Hawk 127
79SQN	No. 79 Squadron	RAAF Base Pearce	BAe Hawk 127
278SQN	No. 278 Squadron	RAAF Base Amberley
278SQN WLM	No. 278 Squadron Williamtown TTF	RAAF Base Williamtown
81 Wing
HQ81WG	Headquarters No. 81 Wing	RAAF Base Williamtown
81WG CWKS	81 Wing Combined Workshops	RAAF Base Williamtown
2OCU	No. 2 Operational Conversion Unit	RAAF Base Williamtown	F-35A Lightning II
2OCU	No. 2 Operational Conversion Unit PTC det (61st Fighter Squadron USAF)	Luke AFB	F-35A Lightning II
3SQN	No. 3 Squadron	RAAF Base Williamtown	F-35A Lightning II
75SQN	No. 75 Squadron	RAAF Base Tindal	F-35A Lightning II
77SQN	No. 77 Squadron	RAAF Base Williamtown	F-35A Lightning II
82 Wing
HQ82WG	Headquarters No. 82 Wing	RAAF Base Amberley
1SQN	No. 1 Squadron	RAAF Base Amberley	F/A-18F Super Hornet
4SQN	No. 4 Squadron	RAAF Base Williamtown	PC-21
6SQN	No. 6 Squadron	RAAF Base Amberley	EA-18G Growler
6SQN	No. 6 Squadron Training Det (VAQ-129)	NAS Whidbey Island
=== Air Mobility Group ===
UNIT	FULL NAME	LOCATION	AIRCRAFT
HQAMG	Headquarters Air Mobility Group	RAAF Base Richmond
84 Wing
HQ84WG	Headquarters No. 84 Wing	RAAF Base Richmond
34SQN	No. 34 Squadron	Defence Establishment Fairbairn	B737 BBJ / CL604
35SQN	No. 35 Squadron	RAAF Base Amberley	C-27J Spartan
37SQN	No. 37 Squadron	RAAF Base Richmond	C-130J Hercules
285SQN	No. 285 Squadron	RAAF Base Richmond
AMTDU	Air Movements Training & Development Unit	RAAF Base Richmond
86 Wing
HQ86G	Headquarters No. 86 Wing	RAAF Base Richmond
33SQN	No. 33 Squadron	RAAF Base Amberley	KC-30A
36SQN	No. 36 Squadron	RAAF Base Amberley	C-17 Globemaster III
=== Surveillance and Response Group ===
UNIT	FULL NAME	LOCATION	EQUIPMENT
HQSRG	Headquarters Surveillance and Response Group	RAAF Base Williamtown
41 Wing
HQ41WG	Headquarters No. 41 Wing	RAAF Base Williamtown
1RSU	No. 1 Remote Sensor Unit	RAAF Base Edinburgh
3CRU	No. 3 Control and Reporting Unit	RAAF Base Williamtown
114MCRU	No. 114 Mobile Control and Reporting Unit	RAAF Base Darwin
114MCRU DET	No. 114 Mobile Control and Reporting Unit Detachment	RAAF Base Tindal
SACTU	Surveillance and Control Training Unit	RAAF Base Williamtown
42 Wing
HQ42WG	Headquarters No. 42 Wing	RAAF Base Williamtown
2SQN	No. 2 Squadron	RAAF Base Williamtown	E-7A Wedgetail
44 Wing
HQ44WG	Headquarters No. 44 Wing	RAAF Base Williamtown	ATC radars etc.
452SQN	No. 452 Squadron	RAAF Base Darwin
452SQN DET AMB	No. 452 Squadron Detachment Amberley	RAAF Base Amberley
452SQN DET DAR	No. 452 Squadron Detachment Darwin	RAAF Base Darwin
452SQN DET OAK	No. 452 Squadron Detachment Oakey	Oakey Army Aviation Centre
452SQN DET TDL	No. 452 Squadron Detachment Tindal	RAAF Base Tindal
452SQN DET TVL	No. 452 Squadron Detachment Townsville	RAAF Base Townsville
453SQN	No. 453 Squadron	RAAF Base Williamtown
453SQN DET ESL	No. 453 Squadron Detachment East Sale	RAAF Base East Sale
453SQN DET EDN	No. 453 Squadron Detachment Edinburgh	RAAF Base Edinburgh
453SQN DET NWA	No. 453 Squadron Detachment Nowra	HMAS Albatross
453SQN DET PEA	No. 453 Squadron Detachment Pearce	RAAF Base Pearce
453SQN DET RIC	No. 453 Squadron Detachment Richmond	RAAF Base Richmond
453SQN DET WLM	No. 453 Squadron Detachment Williamtown	RAAF Base Williamtown
92 Wing
HQ92WG	Headquarters No. 92 Wing	RAAF Base Edinburgh
92WG DET A	No. 92 Wing Detachment A	RMAF Base Butterworth	P-8A Poseidon*
92WG DET B	No. 92 Wing Detachment B	RAAF Base Darwin	P-8A Poseidon*
9SQN	No. 9 Squadron	RAAF Base Edinburgh with aircraft based in RAAF Base Tindal	MQ-4C Triton
10SQN	No. 10 Squadron	RAAF Base Edinburgh	MC-55A
11SQN	No. 11 Squadron	RAAF Base Edinburgh	P-8A Poseidon
12SQN	No. 12 Squadron	RAAF Base Edinburgh	P-8A Poseidon
292SQN	No. 292 Squadron	RAAF Base Edinburgh	P-8A Poseidon*
=== Combat Support Group ===
UNIT	FULL NAME	LOCATION	AIRCRAFT
HQCSG	Headquarters Combat Support Group	RAAF Base Amberley
95 Wing RAAF
HQ395ECSW	Headquarters 95 Expeditionary Wing	RAAF Base Amberley
381ECSS	No. 381 Expeditionary Combat Support Squadron	RAAF Base Williamtown
382ECSS	No. 382 Expeditionary Combat Support Squadron	RAAF Base Amberley
321ECSS	No. 321 Expeditionary Combat Support Squadron	RAAF Base Darwin
322ECSS	No. 322 Expeditionary Combat Support Squadron	RAAF Base Tindal
	Bare Base Management Flight	RAAF Curtin
	Bare Base Management Flight	RAAF Learmonth
	Bare Base Management Flight	RAAF Scherger
323ECSS	No. 323 Expeditionary Combat Support Squadron	RAAF Base Townsville
324CSS	No. 324 Combat Support Squadron	RMAF Base Butterworth
325ECSS	No. 325 Expeditionary Combat Support Squadron	RAAF Base Richmond
1AOSS	No 1 Airfield Operations Support Squadron	RAAF Base Amberley
1CCS	No. 1 Combat Communications Squadron	RAAF Base Richmond
1AFDS	No. 1 Airfield Defence Squadron	RAAF Base Williamtown
2AFDS	No. 2 Airfield Defence Squadron	RAAF Base Amberley
396 Combat Support Wing
HQ396CSW	Headquarters No. 396 Expeditionary Combat Support Wing	RAAF Base Darwin
13SQN	No. 13 Squadron	RAAF Base Darwin
20SQN	No. 20 Squadron	RAAF Base Woomera (With Effect 1 April 2015)
21SQN	No. 21 Squadron	RAAF Williams
22SQN	No. 22 Squadron	RAAF Base Richmond
23SQN	No. 23 Squadron	RAAF Base Amberley
24SQN	No. 24 Squadron	RAAF Base Edinburgh
25SQN	No. 25 Squadron	RAAF Base Pearce
26SQN	No. 26 Squadron	RAAF Base Williamtown
27SQN	No. 27 Squadron	RAAF Base Townsville
29SQN	No. 29 Squadron	Anglesea Barracks, Hobart
30SQN	No. 30 Squadron	RAAF Base East Sale
31SQN	No. 31 Squadron	RAAF Base Wagga
Health Services Wing
HQHSW	Headquarters Health Services Wing	RAAF Base Amberley
1ATHS	No. 1 Air Transportable Health Squadron	RAAF Base Amberley
2ATHS	No. 2 Air Transportable Health Squadron	RAAF Base Williamtown
3CSH	No. 3 Combat Support Hospital	RAAF Base Richmond
=== Air Warfare Centre ===
UNIT	FULL NAME	LOCATION	EQUIPMENT/ROLE
AWC	RAAF Air Warfare Centre	RAAF Base Edinburgh	Integrated Group Command Formation
AWC Integrated Mission Support Directorate
IMSD	AWC Integrated Mission Support Directorate	RAAF Base Edinburgh	Development, coordination and delivery of integrated air warfare solutions
IMS-T	AWC Integrated Mission Support Tasking Branch	RAAF Base Edinburgh	Centralised tasking function for all AWC units
IMS-I	AWC Integrated Mission Support Integrated Projects Branch	RAAF Base Edinburgh	Coordination of AWC integrated air warfare projects
AWC Information Warfare Directorate
JEWOSU	Joint Electronic Warfare Operational Support Unit	RAAF Base Edinburgh	Joint service electronic warfare support
87SQN	No. 87 Squadron	RAAF Base Edinburgh	Air intelligence
460SQN	No. 460 Squadron	Russell Offices Canberra
462SQN	No. 462 Squadron	RAAF Base Edinburgh	Information operations
AWC Tactics & Training Directorate
TTD	AWC Tactics & Training Directorate	RAAF Base Williamtown	TTD operational capability management
AWC Test and Development Directorate
ARDU	Aircraft Research and Development Unit	RAAF Base Edinburgh with detachments at RAAF Bases Amberley and Williamtown	Defence Aerospace Systems Test & Evaluation (Air Platforms Systems Testing)
AWESQN	Air Warfare Engineering Squadron	RAAF Base Edinburgh	Aircraft Test and Evaluation Design & Engineering	Aircraft Stores Compatibility Clearance
IAM	RAAF Institute of Aviation Medicine	RAAF Base Edinburgh	Defence Aviation Medicine Training and Systems Testing
AIS	RAAF Aeronautical Information Service	Victoria Barracks, Melbourne	Australian aeronautical information services
AWC Air Force Ranges Directorate
AFRD	Air Force Ranges Directorate	RAAF Base Edinburgh	AFRD operational capability management
WTR SQN	Woomera Test Range Squadron	RAAF Base Edinburgh with a permanent detachment at RAAF Base Woomera	Squadron-level formation responsible for the day to day conduct of Defence activities at the WTR
WRC	Woomera Range Complex	RAAF Woomera Test Range and RAAF Base Woomera	Specialist defence systems test facility (122,000 sq km)
=== Air Force Training Group ===
UNIT	FULL NAME	LOCATION	AIRCRAFT
HQAFTG	Headquarters Air Force Training Group	RAAF Williams
Air Training Wing
HQATW	Headquarters Air Training Wing	RAAF Base East Sale
ADFBFTS	Basic Flying Training School	Tamworth, NSW	CT/4 Airtrainer
2FTS	No. 2 Flying Training School	RAAF Base Pearce	Pilatus PC-9/PC-21
CFS	Central Flying School	RAAF Base East Sale	Pilatus PC-9/PC-21
1FTS	No. 1 Flying Training School	RAAF Base East Sale
SATC	School of Air Traffic Control	RAAF Base East Sale
32SQN	No. 32 Squadron	RAAF Base East Sale	King Air 350
100SQN	No. 100 Squadron	RAAF Base Point Cook with a flight at Temora Aviation Museum	Historic aircraft display squadron
CSTS	Combat Survival Training School	RAAF Base Townsville
Ground Training Wing
Ground Training Wing	HQ Ground Training Wing	RAAF Base Wagga
ADFLANGS	ADF School of Languages	RAAF Williams
DITC	Defence International Training Centre	RAAF Williams
SALT	RAAF School of Administration and Logistics Training	RAAF Base Wagga
RAAFSTT	RAAF School of Technical Training	RAAF Base Wagga
RAAFSFS	RAAF Security and Fire School	RAAF Base Amberley
EOTS	RAAF Explosive Ordnance Training School	Defence Establishment Orchard Hills
RAAF College
RAAFCOL	Headquarters RAAF College	RAAF Base Wagga
1RTU	1 Recruit Training Unit	RAAF Base Wagga
OTS	Officer Training School	RAAF Base East Sale
SPS	School of Postgraduate Studies	RAAF Base Wagga
MUSEUM	RAAF Museum	RAAF Williams
RAAFBAND	Royal Australian Air Force Band	RAAF Williams
