= List of Royal Australian Air Force wings =

This is a list of the wings organised by the Royal Australian Air Force (RAAF).

== Numbered wings ==
- No. 1 Wing RAAF
- No. 21 Wing RAAF
- No. 22 Wing RAAF
- No. 24 Wing RAAF
- No. 34 Wing RAAF
- No. 41 Wing RAAF
- No. 42 Wing RAAF
- No. 44 Wing RAAF
- No. 61 Wing RAAF
- No. 62 Wing RAAF
- No. 71 Wing RAAF
- No. 72 Wing RAAF
- No. 73 Wing RAAF
- No. 75 Wing RAAF
- No. 76 Wing RAAF
- No. 77 Wing RAAF
- No. 78 Wing RAAF
- No. 79 Wing RAAF
- No. 80 Wing RAAF
- No. 81 Wing RAAF
- No. 82 Wing RAAF
- No. 83 Wing RAAF
- No. 84 Wing RAAF
- No. 85 Wing RAAF
- No. 86 Wing RAAF
- No. 90 Wing RAAF
- No. 91 Wing RAAF
- No. 92 Wing RAAF
- No. 94 Wing RAAF
- No. 95 Wing RAAF
- No. 96 Wing RAAF
- No. 97 Wing RAAF
- No. 301 Air Base Wing RAAF
- No. 302 Air Base Wing RAAF
- No. 303 Air Base Wing RAAF
- No. 304 Air Base Wing RAAF
- No. 305 Air Base Wing RAAF
- No. 306 Air Base Wing RAAF
- No. 307 Air Base Wing RAAF
- No. 321 Air Base Wing RAAF
- No. 322 Air Base Wing RAAF
- No. 323 Air Base Wing RAAF
- No. 324 Air Base Wing RAAF (contingency unit, not permanently established)
- No. 325 Air Base Wing RAAF (contingency unit, not permanently established))
- No. 326 Air Base Wing RAAF (contingency unit, not permanently established))
- No. 327 Air Base Wing RAAF (contingency unit, not permanently established))
- No. 395 Expeditionary Combat Support Wing RAAF
- No. 396 Expeditionary Combat Support Wing RAAF
- No. 402 Wing RAAF
- No. 481 Wing RAAF
- No. 501 Wing RAAF
- No. 503 Wing RAAF

== Named wings ==
- Airfield Defence Wing RAAF
- Air System Development and Test Wing RAAF
- Air Training Wing RAAF
- Ground Training Wing RAAF
- Health Services Wing RAAF
- Information Warfare Directorate RAAF
- INTERFET Combined Air Wing/No. 96 Combined Air Wing RAAF
- Operational Support Wing RAAF
- Reserve Training Wing RAAF
- Search and Rescue Wing RAAF

== See also ==
- Structure of the Royal Australian Air Force
