= Surveillance and Control Training Unit RAAF =

SACTU
- Active: August 9, 1999
- Branch: RAAF
- Role: 41WG training
- Part of: 41 Wing
- Garrison/HQ: RAAF Base Williamtown
- Motto(s): Versatility

The Surveillance and Control Training Unit is a training unit of the Royal Australian Air Force (RAAF). It is provides training and training development of air defence.

Formed in 1999 to provide training to the Surveillance and Control Group, the unit relocated in 2000 to the Eastern Regional Operations Centre at RAAF Base Williamtown and provides training for No. 41 Wing, which is one of four wings attached to the RAAF's Surveillance and Response Group.
