= No. 402 Wing RAAF =

- Active: 1 July 1996–30 October 1998
- Country: Australia
- Branch: Royal Australian Air Force
- Role: Aircraft maintenance and technical support
- Part of: Tactical Fighter Group
- Base: RAAF Base Williamtown

No. 402 Wing was a Royal Australian Air Force wing. Formed in July 1996, it maintained and provided technical support for Tactical Fighter Group's aircraft. The wing was disbanded in October 1998, with most of its functions being transferred to No. 81 Wing.

== History ==
No. 402 Wing was formed from No. 481 Wing on 1 July 1996. It was responsible for maintaining and providing technical support for the aircraft operated by the RAAF's Tactical Fighter Group. These mainly comprised the McDonnell Douglas F/A-18 Hornets operated by No. 81 Wing. The wing's establishment was the result of a review conducted to determine the best way of maintaining the Hornets. These tasks had previously been undertaken by No. 481 Wing, and No. 402 Wing replaced it.

The wing was made up of a headquarters, No. 481 Squadron, Weapons System Support Flight and Field Training Flight. No. 481 Squadron was established at the same time as No. 402 Wing was formed, and included the maintenance elements that hat previously been organised into two squadrons in No. 481 Wing. No. 402 Wing was mainly located at RAAF Base Williamtown.

No. 402 Wing as disbanded as a result of a decision by the Chief of Air Force that the RAAF's flying squadrons should undertake aircraft maintenance. The wing transferred most of its functions to No. 81 Wing and ceased operations on 31 July 1998. It and No. 481 Squadron were formally disbanded on 30 October 1998. Weapons System Support Flight and Field Training Flight were retained, with the former becoming part of the Tactical Fighter Group and the later reporting to No. 81 Wing's headquarters.
