= Tim Vigors =

Royal Air Force fighter pilot (1921–2003)

- Born: 22 March 1921; Hatfield, Hertfordshire
- Died: 14 November 2003 (aged 82); Cambridge, Cambridgeshire
- Military career
- Allegiance: United Kingdom
- Branch: Royal Air Force
- Service years: 1939–1946
- Rank: Wing Commander
- Service number: 33554
- Units: No. 222 Squadron RAF; No. 243 Squadron RAF
- Commands: No. 453 Squadron RAAF
- Conflicts: Second World War: Battle of Britain
- Awards: Distinguished Flying Cross
- Other work: Thoroughbred racehorse breeding

Wing Commander Timothy Ashmead Vigors, DFC (22 March 1921 – 14 November 2003) was a Royal Air Force fighter pilot and flying ace during the Second World War, in which he fought in the Battle of Britain and in the Far East. In civilian life, Vigors began the development of the Coolmore Stud that transformed the breeding of thoroughbred racehorses.

Vigors's account of his wartime experiences was published posthumously in 2006 as Life's Too Short to Cry: The Inspirational Memoir of an Ace Battle of Britain Fighter Pilot.

== Early life and education ==
Vigors was born at Hatfield, Hertfordshire, on 22 March 1921. Although Vigors's father worked as a stockbroker, the family were landowners in County Carlow in Ireland and owned Tullamaine Castle stud in County Tipperary.

He grew up near Melton Mowbray in Leicestershire and hunted with the Mendip from an early age. He was educated at Eton College.

== Military career ==
=== Battle of Britain ===
In January 1939 Vigors enrolled as a cadet at RAF Cranwell. He joined No. 222 Squadron RAF flying Spitfires at RAF Duxford in February 1940. He saw action over Dunkirk in May, shooting down his first Bf 109 on 30 May, at which he felt the same satisfaction, his obituary in The Daily Telegraph recorded him saying, as if he had "pulled down a high-flying pigeon flashing across the evening sky with the wind up his tail". On 1 June he shot down his first Heinkel He 111. He attended the Fourth of June at Eton having fought over Dunkirk that morning.

Through the summer of 1940, 222 Squadron flew from RAF Hornchurch in Essex. The squadron suffered heavy casualties and Vigors was himself twice forced to crash land. He once responded to a call for volunteers to intercept enemy bombers when still wearing his scarlet pyjamas under a green silk dressing gown, shooting down a Heinkel, and during night-time scrambles was in charge of attaching Douglas Bader's tin left leg. By the end of September he had destroyed at least six enemy aircraft, with a further six probable successes. In October 1940 he was awarded the Distinguished Flying Cross.

During the Battle of Britain, Vigors flew with the Irish tricolour painted on his Spitfire's fuselage.

=== Sinking of HMS Prince of Wales and HMS Repulse ===
Vigors was posted to Singapore in December 1940, joining No. 243 Squadron RAF as a flight commander, flying Brewster F2A Buffalo fighters. In December 1941, he took temporary command of No. 453 Squadron RAAF (also equipped with Buffalos).

453 Squadron, based at RAF Sembawang, was designated "fleet defence squadron" for Force Z – a Royal Navy task force, including a battleship, HMS Prince of Wales and a battlecruiser, HMS Repulse – commanded by Admiral Sir Tom Phillips. After the Imperial Japanese Army invaded British Malaya, Force Z moved north from Singapore to attack a Japanese convoy bound for Singora. 453 Squadron and Prince of Wales had previously agreed on a system of radio procedures, to facilitate air cover for Force Z. However, a plan proposed by Vigors to keep six aircraft above the ships in daylight hours was rejected. Moreover, Phillips insisted on maintaining radio silence after leaving port and did not keep 453 Squadron informed of his ships' position.

After failing to locate the Japanese convoy, Philips altered course, in response to reports of Japanese landings at Kuantan. At that point, Force Z came under attack from land-based Japanese bombers and torpedo bombers. No request for air cover was transmitted by the commander of Repulse, until an hour after the Japanese attack began. Pilots from 453 Squadron arrived over the battle area just as Prince of sank; Repulse had sunk 50 minutes earlier. Vigors later commented, "I reckon this must have been the last battle in which the Navy reckoned they could get along without the RAF. A pretty damned costly way of learning."

In December 1941, 453 Squadron was posted to northern Malaya. Vigors had just landed at RAF Butterworth when the airfield came under attack from Japanese aircraft. Vigors ordered the squadron to scramble and retaliate. As they attacked a large formation of bombers, Vigors was shot through the left thigh and his aircraft was hit in the fuel tank. He suffered burns while baling out and landed in a mountainous area near Penang. Two Malay civilians found the injured Vigors and carried him to safety.

=== India and return to UK ===
Vigors was evacuated to India, where he held a number of training appointments and then assumed command of RAF Yelahanka, with responsibility for converting Hurricane pilots to the Thunderbolt ground-attack fighter.

In 1945 he returned to England. He retired from the RAF as a wing commander in November 1946. His final tally of combat victories was 12.

=== Memoir ===
Vigors's account of his experiences in the war was published posthumously in 2006, 56 years after it was written, as Life's Too Short to Cry: The Inspirational Memoir of an Ace Battle of Britain Fighter Pilot.

== Business career ==
After retiring from the RAF, Vigors first set up a photographic agency in Ireland. He then joined the bloodstock auctioneers Goffs, leaving in 1951 to start his own bloodstock agency. Vigors was one of the first bloodstock agents to internationalise the racehorse breeding industry. In 1950 he was instrumental in the Irish horse Nasrullah, standing at stud in America at Claiborne Farm in Paris, Kentucky.

In the 1950s he also set up his own aviation company, based at Kidlington, near Oxford. The company specialised in providing private and executive planes and held the agency for Piper aircraft. The firm was taken over by CSE Aviation and Vigors returned to work in the bloodstock business.

=== Bloodstock ===
Tim Vigors Bloodstock was one of the leading bloodstock operations of the 1960s. In 1964 Vigors paid 37,000 guineas for Chandelier, breaking a 10-year record at Newmarket's December sales. Two years later, again at Newmarket, he paid a record 31,000 guineas on behalf of an international partnership for a yearling colt by Charlottesville. He also bought the fillies Glad Rags and Fleet, who won the 1,000 Guineas in 1966 and 1967 respectively. He was friends with Arthur B. Hancock, Jr., of Claiborne Farm, and Ogden Phipps.

When Vigors sold the firm it became The British Bloodstock Agency (Ireland).

=== Coolmore Stud ===
In 1945 Vigors's father had bought the 400-acre Coolmore farm in County Tipperary, where he trained racehorses. Vigors inherited Coolmore in 1968 and began the development of the farm into one of principal stud operations in thoroughbred horse breeding. In 1973 Vigors sold a 50 per cent share in Coolmore to the legendary Irish trainer Vincent O'Brien, whose Ballydoyle stables were nearby. The young John Magnier was brought in to run the farm.

In 1973 Vigors paid more than £1 million for the stallion Rheingold, winner of the Prix de l'Arc de Triomphe. The Coolmore Stud also stood the American-bred milers, Thatch and Home Guard, both trained by O'Brien, while Magnier brought with him the sprinters Green God and Deep Diver.

In January 1975, the Vigors and O'Brien partnership announced the amalgamation of the Coolmore Stud with the money of Robert Sangster and Magnier's Castle Hyde and Grange studs, creating Coolmore, Castle Hyde and Associated Studs. Coolmore became central to the transformation of thoroughbred horseracing, as Sangster, O'Brien and Magnier set out to capture the leading bloodstock lines, particularly of the stallion Northern Dancer, at increasingly dramatic auctions at the Keeneland Sales in Kentucky. Initially many of their most famous acquisitions, including The Minstrel and Alleged, trained to success on the track by O'Brien, were sold to American syndicates, but Coolmore soon began to increase the quality and size of its breeding operation. In 1982 their Be My Guest was named champion sire. Later horses, including Sadler's Wells and Danehill, have made Coolmore perhaps the most successful, and financially remunerative, stud operation in the world.

=== After Coolmore ===
Vigors sold his share in the Coolmore operation and moved to Spain. He continued to work as a bloodstock agent and in 1983 returned to Newmarket, Suffolk, handling the syndication of the successful sire Indian Ridge and helping to secure High Chaparral's dam, Kasora, at auction for Sean Coughlan.

In 1990, Vigors became racing adviser to Cartier, helping to initiate the annual Cartier Racing Awards.

== Personal life ==
Tim Vigors was married four times. In 1942, in the North West Frontier Province of India, he married Jan, with whom he had three daughters. They divorced in 1968 and that year Vigors married Atalanta Fairey, with whom he had a son. Atalanta Fairey was the widow of the aircraft pioneer Charles Richard Fairey. In 1972 Vigors married Heidi Bohlen, that marriage resulting in two daughters, and in 1982 he married Diana Bryan in Las Vegas.
