= Multi-role Electronically Scanned Array =

Type of aircraft radar

MESA
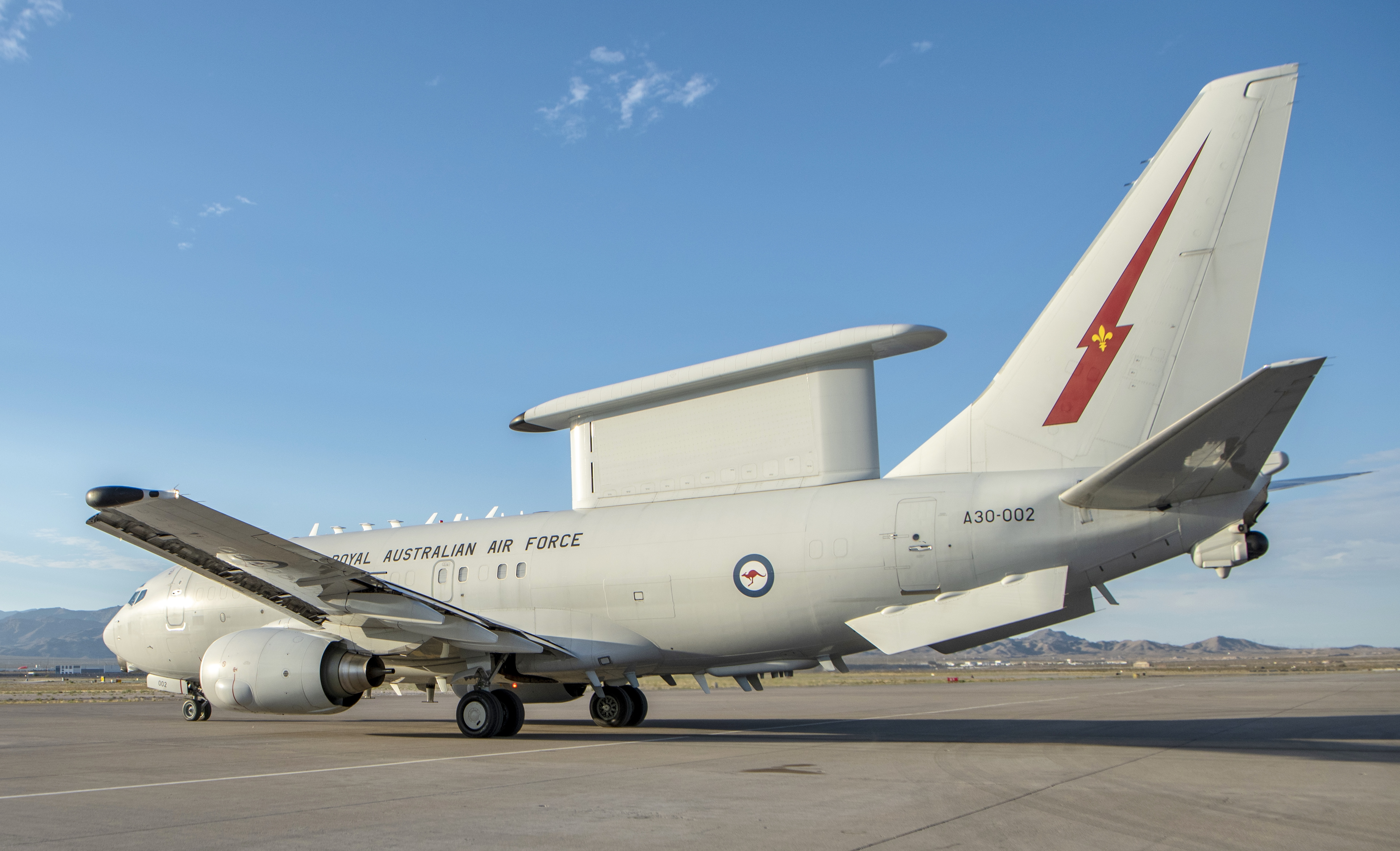
- An E-7 Wedgetail of the RAAF, with the MESA radar on the large dorsal fin on top of the fuselage
- Country of origin: United States
- Manufacturer: Northrop Grumman
- Type: Surveillance radar
- Frequency: L band

The Multi-role Electronically Scanned Array (MESA) is an active electronically scanned array surveillance radar system for the Boeing E-7 Wedgetail airborne early warning and control aircraft. The radar is produced by Northrop Grumman.

== Design and development ==
In the 1990s, Australia recognized a need for an airborne early warning and control (AEW&C) aircraft. In 1996, Australia issued a request for proposal (RFP) for the aircraft for the RAAF under Project Wedgetail, referring to the Wedge-tailed eagle. In 1999, Australia awarded Boeing Integrated Defense Systems a contract to supply four AEW&C aircraft with options for three additional aircraft.

The L band (1 to 2 GHz) electronically scanned AEW and surveillance radar is located on a dorsal fin on top of the fuselage, dubbed the "top hat", and is designed for minimal aerodynamic effect. The radar is capable of simultaneous air and sea search, fighter control and area search, with a maximum range of over 600 km (look-up mode). When operating in look-down mode against fighter-sized target, the maximum range is in excess of 370 km. When used against maritime targets, the maximum range is over 240 km for frigate-sized targets. MESA is capable of simultaneously tracking 180 targets and conducting 24 intercepts. In addition, the radar antenna array is also doubled as an ELINT array, with a maximum range of over 850 km at 30,000 feet (9,000 m) altitude.

The 10.8 m long by 3.4 m high antenna assembly incorporates 7.3 m long by 2.7 m high Side-Emitting Electronic Manifold array, with the top hat supporting array providing 120° coverage on port and starboard side, while the top hat array itself provides 60° fore and aft, thus providing a complete 360° coverage. The radar's beam can be set for a 2° to 8° width, while scan duration can be set from 3 s to 40 s. Radar signal processing equipment and central computer are installed directly below the antenna array.

The cabin features eight operator consoles with sufficient space for four more; the Australian fleet will operate ten consoles with space for two more (four on starboard side and six on the port side).

== Applications ==
- Boeing E-7 Wedgetail

== See also ==
- List of radars
