= Airfield Defence Wing RAAF =

Airfield Defence Wing
- Branch: RAAF
- Part of: Combat Support Group
- Garrison/HQ: RAAF Base Amberley
- Motto(s): Protect the Force

The Airfield Defence Wing of the Royal Australian Air Force (RAAF) was formed to provide command and control of the RAAFs Airfield Defence Squadrons (AFDSs). Between the end of World War II and 1983, the RAAF did not possess a formed unit of ground defence specialists. No. 2 Airfield Defence Squadron (2AFDS) was reformed as the sole AFDS in 1983; however, following the introduction of the Ready Reserve scheme in 1992, No. 1 Airfield Defence Squadron (1AFDS) was reformed at RAAF Base Tindal, Northern Territory. The establishment of two squadrons led to the requirement for a parent headquarters to provide appropriate command and control, with AFDW being formed in 1994. No. 3 Airfield Defence Squadron was raised in 1996 as a further subordinate unit of AFDW. The wing was disbanded in 2006 and its function absorbed by No. 395 Expeditionary Combat Support Wing. 3AFDS was disbanded as part of the same process.
