= No. 26 Squadron RAAF =

Royal Australian Air Force squadron

- Founded: 1 July 1981
- Country: Australia
- Branch: Royal Australian Air Force
- Role: Reserve unit
- Size: 170 personnel
- Part of: No. 96 Wing
- Headquarters: RAAF Base Williamtown
- Motto(s): "Enterprise"

No. 26 (City of Newcastle) Squadron RAAF is a Royal Australian Air Force Reserve squadron, headquartered at RAAF Base Williamtown in New South Wales, Australia. The squadron's role is to provide trained personnel to regular RAAF units during operations and on exercise.

== History ==
It was formed on 1 July 1981, initially as an Auxiliary unit of the Citizens Air Force. In September 1983, the unit was redesignated as an active Reserve squadron. The unit consists of a small cadre of Regular personnel who administer the unit's contingent of around 170 Reservists.

Forming part of No. 96 Wing, the unit is tasked with various base support roles, and is responsible for Air Force Reservists in the Hunter Region of New South Wales, providing trained personnel to regular RAAF units during operations and exercises. The unit's motto is Enterprise.

== Bibliography ==
- Barnes, Norman (2000). The RAAF and the Flying Squadrons. St Leonards, New South Wales: Allen & Unwin. ISBN 1-86508-130-2.
