= No. 453 Squadron RAAF =

Royal Australian Air Force squadron

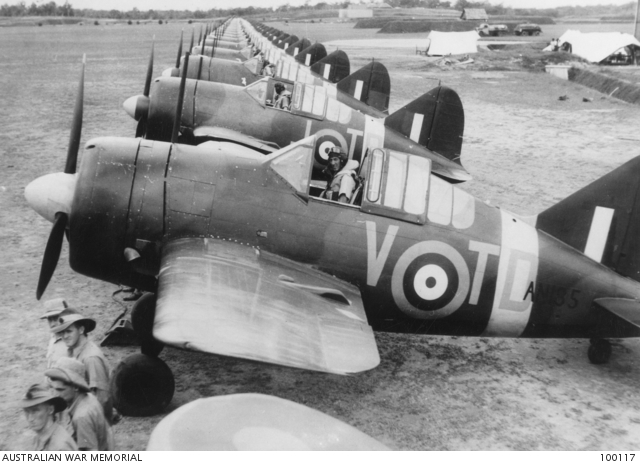
- Brewster Buffalo aircraft at Sembawang Airbase, Singapore, November 1941
- Active: 23 May 1941 – 15 March 1942; 18 June 1942 – 21 January 1946; 16 February 2011–current
- Country: Australia
- Branch: Royal Australian Air Force
- Role: Fighter (1941–1946); Air traffic control (2011–current)
- Part of: No. 44 Wing
- Motto(s): Ready to strike
- Battle honours: English Channel and North Sea, 1939–1945; Fortress Europe, 1940–1944; France and Germany, 1944–1945; Normandy, 1944; Rhine; Malaya, 1941–1942

Insignia
- Squadron badge heraldry: Perched on a branch a kookaburra
- Squadron codes: TD (May 1941 – March 1942); FN (June 1942 – August 1942); FU (June 1942 – January 1946)

Aircraft flown
- Fighter: Brewster Buffalo; Supermarine Spitfire

No. 453 Squadron is an air traffic control unit of the Royal Australian Air Force. It was established at Bankstown, New South Wales, in 1941 as a fighter squadron, in accordance with Article XV of the Empire Air Training Scheme for overseas service with the Royal Air Force during World War II. No. 453 Squadron saw combat first in the Malayan and Singapore campaigns of 1941–42. Severe aircraft losses effectively destroyed the squadron and it was disbanded in March 1942. A successor unit by the same name was raised in Britain from mid-1942, to take part in fighting against Nazi Germany in Europe until 1945. The squadron was disbanded in 1946. It was re-formed in its current role in 2011.

== History ==
=== World War II ===
==== Malaya and Singapore ====
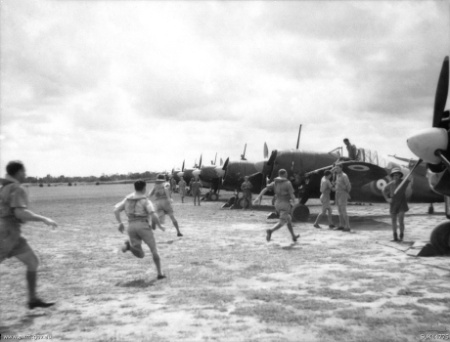
No. 453 Squadron pilots run to their Buffalos in response to a scramble order

No. 453 Squadron was raised as an Article XV squadron under the terms of the Empire Air Training Scheme, at Bankstown, New South Wales, on 23 May 1941. It was deployed to Singapore in August 1941, as fears of war with Japan increased. No. 453 Squadron, along with No. 21 Squadron RAAF, No. 243 Squadron RAF and No. 488 Squadron RNZAF, converted to Brewster F2A Buffalo fighters, which proved to be poorly built, unreliable and unpopular with the pilots. The squadron was initially deployed to Sembawang.

When the Japanese invasion of Malaya began on 8 December (7 December in the Western Hemisphere, coinciding with the attack on Pearl Harbor), the commanding officer of No. 453 Squadron, Squadron Leader William Harper was visiting Australia. A British officer, Flight Lieutenant Tim Vigors of No. 243 Squadron RAF, was attached to No. 453 Squadron as acting commanding officer.

The squadron was ordered to provide air cover for the two British battleships making up Admiral Tom Phillips' Force Z: Repulse and Prince of Wales. However, Phillips' actions, including a resistance to liaise with the Allied air forces (see Force Z#Air cover), exposed the battleships to a Japanese air attack that occurred on 10 December. Tim Vigors, the acting commanding officer of No. 453 Squadron was not notified of the location of Force Z until an hour after the Japanese attack had begun. Repulse and Prince of Wales were both sunk. Three days later, the squadron's 16 aircraft were ordered to move to Ipoh; during the move, three aircraft were lost as a result of accidents. On arrival, the squadron was "scrambled" to defend the airfield against a Japanese bomber attack and in the ensuing dogfight, five Japanese aircraft were destroyed. The following day, the squadron was again scrambled to defend its airbase against a large formation of 40 Japanese fighters; three Japanese aircraft were shot down for the loss of one aircraft in the air, and several on the ground. After this, No. 453 Squadron moved to Kuala Lumpur where they received a batch of replacement aircraft.

No. 453 Squadron strove to support Allied ground troops in Malaya by providing air cover and attacking Japanese troops and transport, but the outnumbered Allied squadrons suffered high losses in the air and on the ground. The heaviest losses came on 22 December when five Buffalos were destroyed and another four damaged, with three pilots being killed. On 24 December, with only three working aircraft remaining, No. 453 Squadron withdrew to Singapore and merged with 21 Squadron, which was brought up to strength with an allocation of replacement aircraft. The amalgamated unit continued to fight on, until late January when they were separated again. No. 21 Squadron was then sent to the Netherlands East Indies, while No. 453 continued to operate the remaining six Buffaloes. In early February, only four aircraft remained operational and they were flown to Java while the squadron's ground crew were evacuated by ship. When No. 453 Squadron arrived in Java it could not be brought up to operational readiness again due to lack of serviceable aircraft. It was ordered back to Australia, and was officially disbanded at Adelaide on 15 March 1942. In spite of many technical problems, and being outmatched by the Japanese Zero, the Buffalo squadrons claimed a 2:1 kill ratio against Japanese aircraft in 1941–42.

==== Europe ====
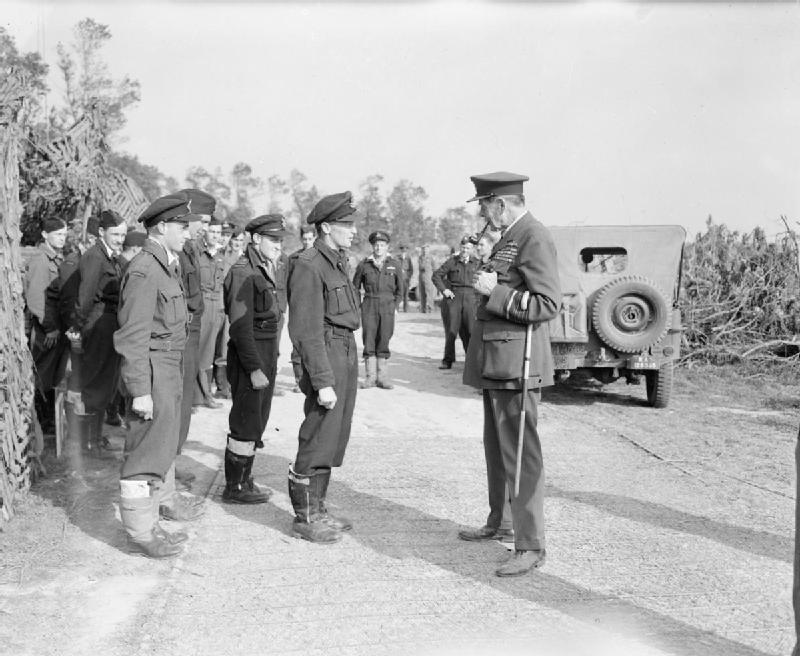
Members of No. 453 Squadron meet Marshal of the Royal Air Force Lord Hugh Trenchard (right), at landing ground B11 near Longues-sur-Mer, in 1944. The squadron had just completed an armed reconnaissance mission during which 22 German vehicles were destroyed. Trenchard is talking to the squadron's Commanding Officer, Squadron Leader Donald Smith.

The squadron was reformed from Australian personnel in the United Kingdom at RAF Drem, near Edinburgh, in Scotland on 18 June 1942. The squadron was equipped with Supermarine Spitfire aircraft, and joined RAF Fighter Command. The squadron provided defensive air patrols over Britain and surrounding waters, escorted Allied bombers over Europe, and conducted offensive strikes in its own right attacking targets on both land and sea. Its first engagement with German aircraft came on 31 October 1942, after it had moved to Hornchurch; during this action the squadron accounted for three German fighters and one bomber, and lost one of its own aircraft. At the end of the year, the squadron relocated to Southend and continued operations from there until mid-1943 when it moved to Ibsley, remaining there until August when it moved once again to Perranporth. While operating from there, on 8 October, the squadron engaged a formation of eight German Messerschmitt Bf 110 fighter-bombers, during which five German aircraft were shot down and two Spitfires were destroyed.

In January 1944, the squadron joined the Allies Second Tactical Air Force, attached to No. 125 Wing RAF (part of No. 83 Group RAF). Further moves occurred over subsequent months, as the squadron began to focus on ground attack sorties, in the lead up to the Allied invasion of North West Europe. Soon after D-Day, the squadron moved to France, where it operated from the hastily constructed landing ground B11 at Longues-sur-Mer, close to the front line. On 16 June, a large-scale dogfight was fought with 12 Messerschmitt Bf 109s over Caen, during which several were shot down. As the Allies advanced, the squadron moved forward so that it could continue to provide close support to the ground troops. This continued until September 1944 when the squadron was withdrawn back to the United Kingdom. From November 1944 to March 1945, No. 453 Squadron was heavily engaged in striking at assembly and launch sites used by the Germans in their V-1 and V-2 rocket attacks against Britain.

On 2 May 1945, the squadron escorted the aircraft that returned Queen Wilhelmina to The Netherlands after three years in exile. This was No. 453 Squadron's last mission of the war; it moved between several bases in Britain in the months immediately following the end of hostilities before deploying to Germany in September. After the war it was planned that the squadron would form a long-term Australian presence among the occupation forces but sufficient volunteers could not be found to make this a viable proposition. Thus, on 21 January 1946 the squadron disbanded. During the war the squadron suffered 29 fatalities, all but one of them Australian.

=== Since 2011 ===
No. 453 Squadron was re-raised, as an air traffic control unit, on 16 February 2011. It forms part of No. 44 Wing and is headquartered at RAAF Base Williamtown, New South Wales. The squadron maintains subordinate flights at Williamtown, RAAF Base Richmond, RAAF Base East Sale, RAAF Base Edinburgh, RAAF Base Pearce and the Royal Australian Navy air base HMAS Albatross, providing air traffic control for these bases.

== Aircraft operated ==
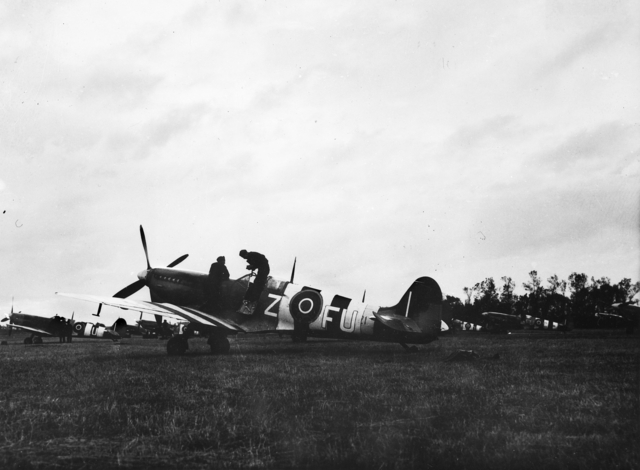
No. 453 Squadron Spitfires, featuring invasion stripes on their wings, at an airfield in Normandy in mid/late 1944

No. 453 Squadron operated the following aircraft:

From	To	Aircraft	Version
August 1941	February 1942	Brewster Buffalo	Mk.I
June 1942	April 1943	Supermarine Spitfire	Mk.Vb
March 1943	June 1943	Supermarine Spitfire	Mk.IXb
June 1943	October 1943	Supermarine Spitfire	Mk.Vc
June 1943	January 1944	Supermarine Spitfire	Mk.Vb
January 1944	July 1944	Supermarine Spitfire	Mk.IXb
July 1944	September 1944	Supermarine Spitfire	Mk.IXe
September 1944	November 1944	Supermarine Spitfire	Mk.IXb
November 1944	June 1945	Supermarine Spitfire	LF.XVI
August 1945	January 1946	Supermarine Spitfire	LF.XIV

== Commanding officers ==
Flight Lieutenant Tim Vigors on the loss of Prince of Wales and Repulse:

I reckon this must have been the last battle in which the [Royal] Navy reckoned they could get along without the RAF. A pretty damned costly way of learning. I had worked out a plan with the liaison officer on the Prince of Wales, by which I could keep six aircraft over him all daylight hours within 60 miles of the east coast to a point north of Kota Bharu. This plan was turned down by Admiral Phillips. Had I been allowed to put it into effect, I am sure the ships would not have been sunk. Six fighters could have made one hell of a mess of even 50 or 60 slow and unescorted torpedo-bombers.

As we could do nothing else, we kept virtually the whole squadron at readiness at Sembawang while the Fleet was out. I was actually sitting in my cockpit when the signal eventually reached us that the Fleet was being attacked. Phillips had known that he was being shadowed the night before, and also at dawn that day. He did not call for air support. He was attacked and still did not call for help. Eventually it was the captain of Repulse who called for air support just before his ship sunk.

No. 453 Squadron was commanded by the following officers:

From	To	Name
23 May 1941	17 August 1941	Flight Lieutenant William Keith Wells
17 August 1941	6 September 1941	Squadron Leader William Faulkiner Allshorn
6 September 1941	2 December 1941	Squadron Leader William John Harper
2 December 1941	15 December 1942	Squadron Leader Timothy Ashmead Vigors
15 December 1941	15 March 1942	Squadron Leader William John Harper
12 June 1942	4 August 1942	Squadron Leader Francis Victor Morello
4 August 1942	13 January 1943	Flight Lieutenant John Richard Ratten
13 January 1943	14 March 1943	Wing Commander James Hogarth Slater, AFC (KIA)
14 March 1943	11 May 1943	Squadron Leader John Richard Ratten
11 May 1943	28 September 1943	Squadron Leader Kelvin Milne Barclay
28 September 1943	2 May 1944	Squadron Leader Donald George Andrews, DFC
2 May 1944	28 September 1944	Squadron Leader Donald Hamilton Smith
28 September 1944	27 August 1945	Squadron Leader Ernest Arthur Roy Esau, DFC
27 August 1945	6 January 1946	Squadron Leader Douglas Mackenzie Davidson, DFC
7 January 1946	21 January 1946	Flight Lieutenant Toderick Edmund Hilton, DFC
