= No. 381 Expeditionary Combat Support Squadron RAAF =

381 Expeditionary Combat Support Squadron
- Active: 1998-
- Branch: RAAF
- Role: Garrison Airbase Operations and Expeditionary Combat Support
- Part of: 395ECSW
- Garrison/HQ: RAAF Base Williamtown
- Motto(s): Lead the Way

Insignia
- Callsign: The Night Owl

381ECSS is an expeditionary combat support squadron of the RAAF formed at RAAF Williamtown, NSW in May 1998. It is a fully deployable airbase operations unit that provides airbase-specific operations support and common 'close' combat support functions to one or more collocated flying units at a forward operating base. Effectively an ECSS runs the base support to ensure lodger flying units are able to concentrate on the projection of the required air power to support directed RAAF missions.

To date 381ECSS has assisted in Operations Warden/Stabilize (East Timor), Gold (Sydney Olympics), Relex (bare base activation to support maritime interdiction operations), Gaberdine (Immigration Support), Guardian (CHOGM Support), Slipper (Global War on Terrorism), Bastille and Falconer (Iraq War). These activities have included defence aid to the civilian community, activation of bare bases, support to the UN peacekeeping missions, support to border protection, coalition force activities in the Fight Against Terrorism and the War in Iraq.

381ECSS's in-garrison role is to provide specialist military airbase operations at Williamtown in concert with other airbase service providers such as Defence Support Group and Joint Logistics Command. At its 'home' base 381ECSS does not provide all base support services, but when deployed it has the capability (see above) to support a bare base, a greenfield airfield or to augment operations on an existing main base as required, providing all the services to make it a fully operational base.
