= No. 3 Control and Reporting Unit RAAF =

No. 3 Control and Reporting Unit
- Active: 1 November 1967-
- Branch: RAAF
- Role: Surveillance and Air Battle Management
- Part of: 41 Wing
- Garrison/HQ: RAAF Base Williamtown, RAAF Base Tindal
- Motto(s): Unite
- Equipment: AN/TPS-77 (phasing out), Vigilare

No. 3 Control and Reporting Unit (3CRU) is a Royal Australian Air Force surveillance unit. 3CRU is currently headquartered at RAAF Base Williamtown near Newcastle, New South Wales and is primarily responsible for conducting surveillance of Australia's airspace and air battle management for RAAF flying squadrons. Operating from the Eastern Region Operations Centre, known commonly as EROC, 3CRU is the premier ADGE unit. A detachment of 3CRU, 3CRU DET TDL, operates from the Northern Region Operations Centre (NROC) at RAAF Base Tindal and currently operates the Vigilare air surveillance system.

By 2024, the unit will have received one of its new CEAFAR HPAR-64SG AESA radars, replacing the TPS-77.
