= No. 1 Combat Communications Squadron RAAF =

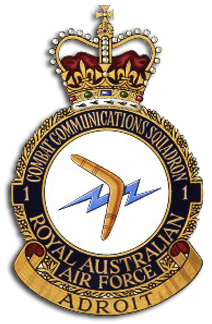
- 1CCS Squadron badge
- Active: 1965–present
- Country: Australia
- Branch: Royal Australian Air Force
- Role: Communications
- Size: 350 Personnel
- Part of: Air Command
- Headquarters: RAAF Base Amberley
- Nickname(s): 1CCS
- Motto(s): Adroit

Insignia
- Unofficial motto: No Comms, No Bombs!

The Royal Australian Air Force's No. 1 Combat Communications Squadron (1CCS) is a squadron within No. 95 Wing and is responsible for the provision of expeditionary Communications and Information Systems (CIS) to support Air Force and Australian Defence Force operations and exercises.

== History ==
1CCS was formed on 20 September 1965 as the Air Transportable Telecommunications Unit (ATTU). ATTU's role was to provide simple Communication Centres (COMCENs) in the field in support of air operations. Over the years, the role has evolved to also include Air Traffic Control systems, navigational aids, and CIS required to establish a fully functioning military air base.

On 1 July 1999, after providing communications support for 34 years, ATTU was retitled No 1 Combat Communications Squadron, however the role of the squadron remained the same.

1CCS has a long and distinguished record of providing tactical Communications and Information Systems in support of Australian Defence Force operations and exercises. 1CCS has grown significantly over the years, from 12 people in 1965 to the present day, where about 380 personnel provide tactical and temporary CIS support to operations, exercises, and other activities in support of Air Force and the Australian Defence Force.

Capabilities that 1CCS can provide are many and varied. These include the deployable provision of radio systems, ICT systems, and air traffic control support systems. This can be provided from established Air Force bases, remote locations or anywhere in the world. 1CCS is often required to provide tactical and temporary communications during disaster relief operations local to Australia or overseas.

1CCS's personnel are primarily network technicians (NETECH) managed by electrical engineers (ELECTR). The squadron also has a cadre of administration, logistics and ground support personnel.

The Squadron Headquarters and the Amberley Flight are located at RAAF Base Amberley on the outskirts of Brisbane in Queensland. Flights of personnel and equipment are also located at RAAF Base Williamtown in New South Wales and RAAF Base Edinburgh in South Australia.

On 20 September 2015, 1CCS celebrated its 50th anniversary.

== Active service ==
Personnel and equipment from 1CCS and ATTU have deployed on nearly every major operation, humanitarian assistance mission and exercise that the Air Force has been involved in since 1965.

Major operational deployments include:

- Afghanistan (Large-scale Combat mission)
- Timor Leste 2006 (Counter-insurgent mission)
- Solomon Islands 2003 (Small-scale mission)
- Iraq 2003 (Large-scale combat mission)
- Kyrgyzstan 2002 (Medium to large scale combat mission)
- East Timor 1999–2000 (Medium scale combat mission)
- Cambodia 1991 (Medium to Large scale combat mission)
- Sumatra Assist 2004-2005 (Humanitarian)
- Papua New Guinea Assist 2007 (Humanitarian)
- Pakistan Assist II 2010-2012 (Humanitarian)
- Kabul Evacuation 2021 (Humanitarian)
- Bushfire Assist 2020 (Domestic Support)
- COVID Assist (Domestic Support)
- Flood Assist 22 (Domestic Support)

== Honours and awards ==
- 2019 Markowski Cup
- 2009 Markowski Cup
- 2003 Meritorious Unit Citation
- 1995 Duke of Gloucester Cup (ATTU)

== Meritorious Unit Citation ==
For sustained outstanding service in warlike operations in providing expeditionary communication and information systems support during Operations BASTILLE and FALCONER.

Number 1 Combat Communications Squadron is based at Royal Australian Air Force Base Richmond, and was given the mission of providing communications and information systems support to deployed elements of the Royal Australian Air Force, on deployment on combat operations in the Middle East Area of Operations. During Operations BASTILLE and FALCONER, the Squadron provided meritorious service to the Royal Australian Air Force mission through the provision of expeditionary combat communications to elements which were deployed to four separate locations in the Middle East Area of Operations.

The successful provision of this vital communications support was only achieved after the Squadron completed detailed tactical planning and identified and completed some extensive modifications to existing and new communications equipment in a very short timeframe to meet the planned mission. The requirement for the communications packages and personnel to be able to integrate with the Coalition Theatre communications plan meant the Squadron was required to mobilise all of its Australian-based communications assets and trained personnel. In addition, the Squadron had to undertake specialised force and battle preparation activities of personnel and equipment. Under considerable time pressure, the Squadron worked very long hours and showed outstanding ingenuity and resourcefulness to provide the right communications packages capable of supporting air combat operations. The Unit demonstrated the highest levels of professional excellence, technical expertise and dedication throughout the hectic preparation period.

Once deployed to the Area of Operations, the Squadron elements provided manning and specialist expertise in the delivery of the full range of communications and data requirements for the Australian aviation elements. The Squadron successfully provided air-ground-air voice nets, satellite communications bearers, classified and restricted information systems and conduits for the delivery of joint command and control and logistics systems. The communications provided by Number 1 Combat Communications Squadron ensured that the functions of command, air combat, air transport and logistics could be carried out with speed and confidence by all levels of the Australian command team and the operational elements. In addition, that these critical communications and network links were sustained under heavy usage and in a harsh and demanding environment is a credit to the hard work, professional skills and ingenuity of the Squadron personnel. Their efforts played a major part in the success of the Australian contribution to the Coalition to disarm Iraq.

Through the combined efforts of the Squadron's command, planning, maintenance, logistics and technical sections, Number 1 Combat Communications Squadron provided meritorious service to the Royal Australian Air Force in the provision of expeditionary communications support during Operations BASTILLE and FALCONER.

Members that were posted to the Squadron and deployed on Operation FALCONER in 2003 are entitled to wear the Meritorious Unit Citation Badge with Federation Star for life. Personnel who joined the Squadron after Operation FALCONER are entitled to wear the Meritorious Unit Citation Badge without Federation Star for the duration of their posting to 1CCS.

== Squadron badge ==
Original Unit Badge: February 1973 (Air Transportable Telecommunications Unit)

Background and Description: In front of a flash of lightning fessways a boomerang.

Motto: Adroit (Dextrous, Skillful)

Close Copy: 26 April 2000 (No 1 Combat Communications Squadron)

Status: Active Unit, Richmond NSW

Crown Bound by: St Edwards

Monarch: Elizabeth R

The Design: The flash of lightning is intended to refer to radio communications by the use of electrical energy signifying the basic function of the unit which is to provide tactical communications and navigation aids in support of air operations in forward areas. The boomerang, in flight, refers to the use of air transportation as the normal means of deployment of unit personnel and equipment to the tactical areas and, consequently the need for all unit equipment to be air transportable.

== Governor-General's Banner ==
The Governor-General's Banner is awarded by the Governor-General, to non-operational Squadrons for 25 years service to the Royal Australian Air Force. The 1CCS Governor-General's Banner was consecrated in 2003.

On the 90th anniversary of the formation of the Royal Australian Air Force, 31 March 2011, 1CCS was awarded an operational streamer to attach to the Governor-General's Banner in recognition of the Meritorious Unit Citation it was awarded in 2003 for warlike operations on Operation FALCONER.
