= No. 42 Wing RAAF =

No. 42 Wing
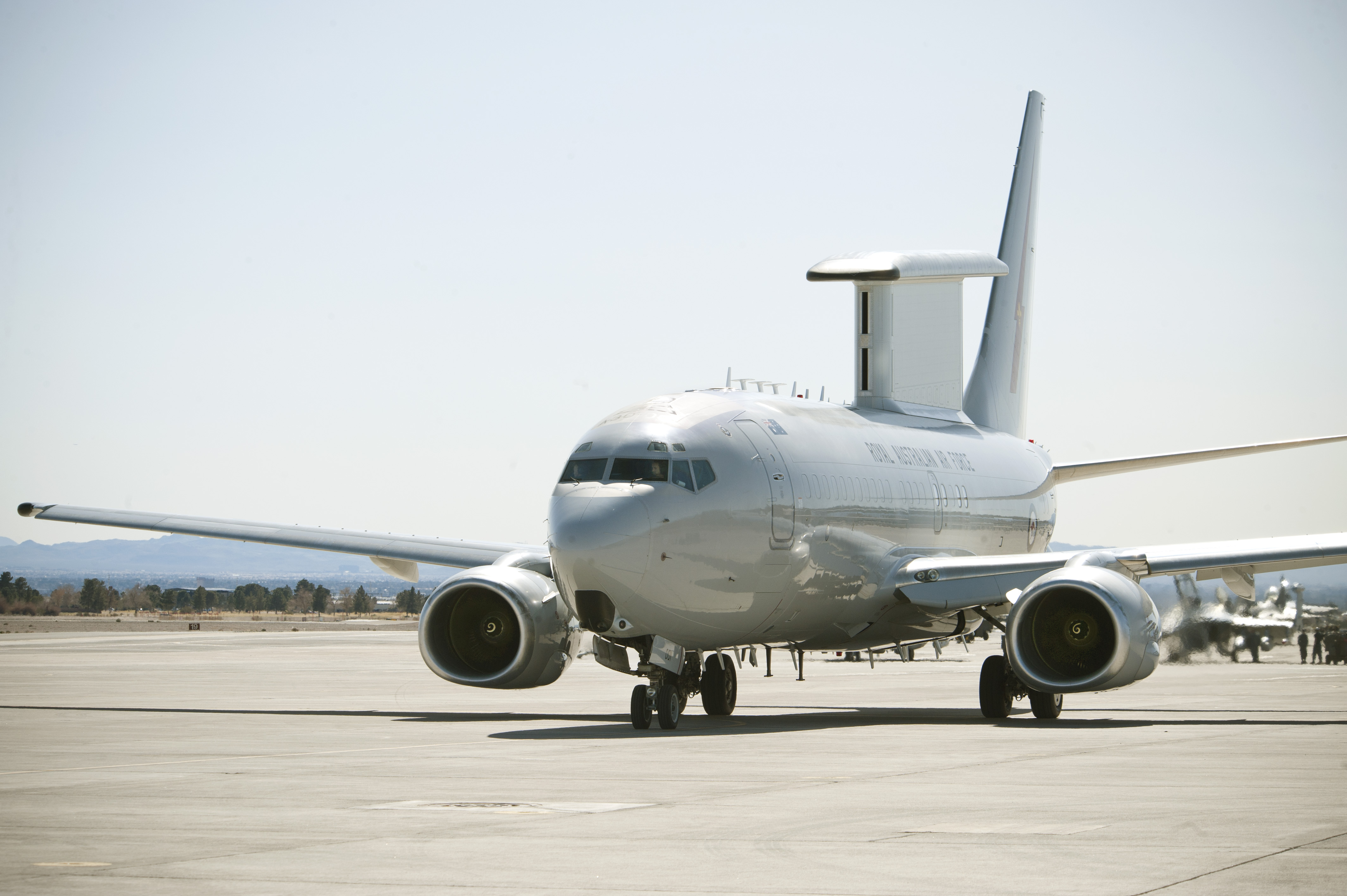
- A RAAF Boeing E-7A Wedgetail in 2013
- Active: 1943–44; 2006–2023
- Branch: Royal Australian Air Force
- Role: Airborne Early Warning & Control
- Part of: Surveillance & Response Group
- Garrison/HQ: RAAF Base Williamtown
- Motto: "Defend From Above"
- Aircraft: Boeing E-7A Wedgetail

No. 42 Wing was a Royal Australian Air Force (RAAF) wing responsible for supporting the service's Boeing E-7A Wedgetail aircraft. It was first formed in February 1943, and commanded RAAF radar stations in north Queensland and the south coast of Dutch New Guinea until being disbanded in October 1944. It was re-raised in its current role in 2006 and disbanded in 2023.

== History ==
No. 42 Wing was established at Townsville, Queensland, on 1 February 1943. It was one of three radar wings formed at around this time (along with No. 41 and No. 44 Wings) to improve the command and control arrangements for the RAAF's large network of radar stations. No. 42 Wing had responsibility for the radar stations located in northern Queensland and the south coast of Dutch New Guinea. As well as controlling their activities, the wing headquarters coordinated the movement of replacement personnel, medical services, mail and supplies to the stations. In addition, the wing established new stations and moved existing units in consultation with the local operational RAAF commands in the area.

By mid-1944 it was judged that the radar wings were not suited to supporting the rapid Allied advance in the South West Pacific. As a result, it was decided to disband all three units and transfer the radar stations to mobile fighter control units. No. 42 Wing was disbanded on 1 October 1944, and its subordinate radar stations were transferred to No. 113 Mobile Fighter Control Unit.

During the mid-2000s it was decided to re-establish No. 42 Wing as part of the process of introducing the RAAF's six Boeing E-7A Wedgetail airborne early warning and control aircraft into service. The unit was reformed at RAAF Base Williamtown on 1 January 2006. The intention of this structure was to allow No. 2 Squadron to focus on operating the Wedgetails. As of 2015, No. 42 Wing's headquarters and No. 2 Squadron were based in a highly secure facility at RAAF Base Williamtown.

No. 10 Squadron was transferred to the control of No. 42 Wing on 2 May 2019. This unit is located at RAAF Base Edinburgh and operated two Lockheed AP-3C(EW) Orions that had been modified for an electronic warfare role until December 2023.

No. 42 Wing was disbanded on 4 September 2023 as part of reforms to streamline the RAAF's Surveillance & Response Group. No. 2 Squadron was transferred to No. 41 Wing and No. 10 Squadron returned to No. 92 Wing.
