= No. 97 Wing RAAF =

No. 97 Wing was a temporary formation established on 24 October 1997 to command the Royal Australian Air Force (RAAF) elements deployed for drought relief purposes to Papua New Guinea during Operation Ples Drai. It was led by Wing Commander Chris Richards, who was also the commander of the Air Component of Joint Task Force 105 which had been established for this operation.

The size of the Air Component varied over time, but the RAAF aircraft assigned to it typically included two Lockheed C-130 Hercules and three de Havilland Canada DHC-4 Caribou transport aircraft. The Air Component usually also included three Sikorsky S-70 Black Hawk and two Boeing CH-47 Chinook helicopters provided by the Australian Army, and was staffed by around 100 personnel.

All of the aircraft assigned to Operation Ples Drai returned to Australia in April 1998.
