= No. 44 Wing RAAF =

No. 44 Wing
- Active: 1942–44; 2000–current
- Branch: Royal Australian Air Force
- Role: Air traffic control
- Part of: Surveillance and Response Group
- Garrison/HQ: RAAF Base Williamtown
- Motto: Steadfastness

No. 44 Wing is a Royal Australian Air Force (RAAF) wing responsible for providing air traffic control services to the Australian Defence Force. It directly commands two squadrons, which in turn command eleven air traffic control flights located across the country at nine RAAF bases, HMAS Albatross (Naval Air Station) and Oakey Army Aviation Centre. The wing was formed during World War II, in December 1942, and was disbanded in August 1944. It was re-established in its current form in November 2000.

== History ==
=== World War II ===
No. 44 Wing, known initially as No. 44 Radio Wing then as No. 44 RDF Wing and later as No. 44 Radar Wing, was formed on 14 December 1942 in the Northern Territory with Wing headquarters at the 58½ mile point on the Stuart Highway. This location is south of Coomalie Creek located 85 km (53 mile) south of the city of Darwin, and 12.3 km (7.5 mile) east of the town of Batchelor. The Wing location has sometimes been simplified to be at Adelaide River, which is 100 kilometres (62 mi) south of Darwin, Northern Territory. Coming under the control of North-Western Area Command, the wing was responsible for controlling the radar stations that acted as an early warning system for Japanese air raids. North-Western Area Command had a nearby local headquarters at the 57 mile point on the Stuart Highway. The North-Western Area Campaign was, in the words of the official history of the RAAF in the Pacific theatre, "almost entirely an air war, with raid and counter-raid". The Wing was commanded by Flight Lieutenant Harold William Hannam (021940) (14 December 1942 to 18 January 1943), Flight Lieutenant Rex Wright Wadsley (252244) (18 January 1943 to 5 November 1943) and Flight Lieutenant Robert Ralph Chilton (263101) (5 November 1943 to 22 August 1944), and by March 1943 had a staff of 77 officers and other ranks. 44 Wing Headquarters strength at 58½ Mile from June 1943 to August 1944 varied in the ranges 10 - 15 Officers and 80 - 160 Airmen.

On formation, No. 44 Wing controlled six radar stations in the Darwin area. Over the next two years it established seventeen new stations throughout the North-Western Area, relocated ten, and disbanded two others, and also set up twelve homing beacons. It further established supply, maintenance and repair facilities, as well as communications with No. 5 Fighter Sector Headquarters to coordinate air defence in the region. Hannam was mentioned in despatches for his achievements. After the fighting in New Guinea had ceased, the threat of air raids on mainland Australia eased, and No. 44 Wing was disbanded on 22 August 1944. Its radar stations and other facilities were divested to various fighter, radio and maintenance units in the area.

The heritage values of the site at 58½ mile have been assessed.

=== Re-establishment ===
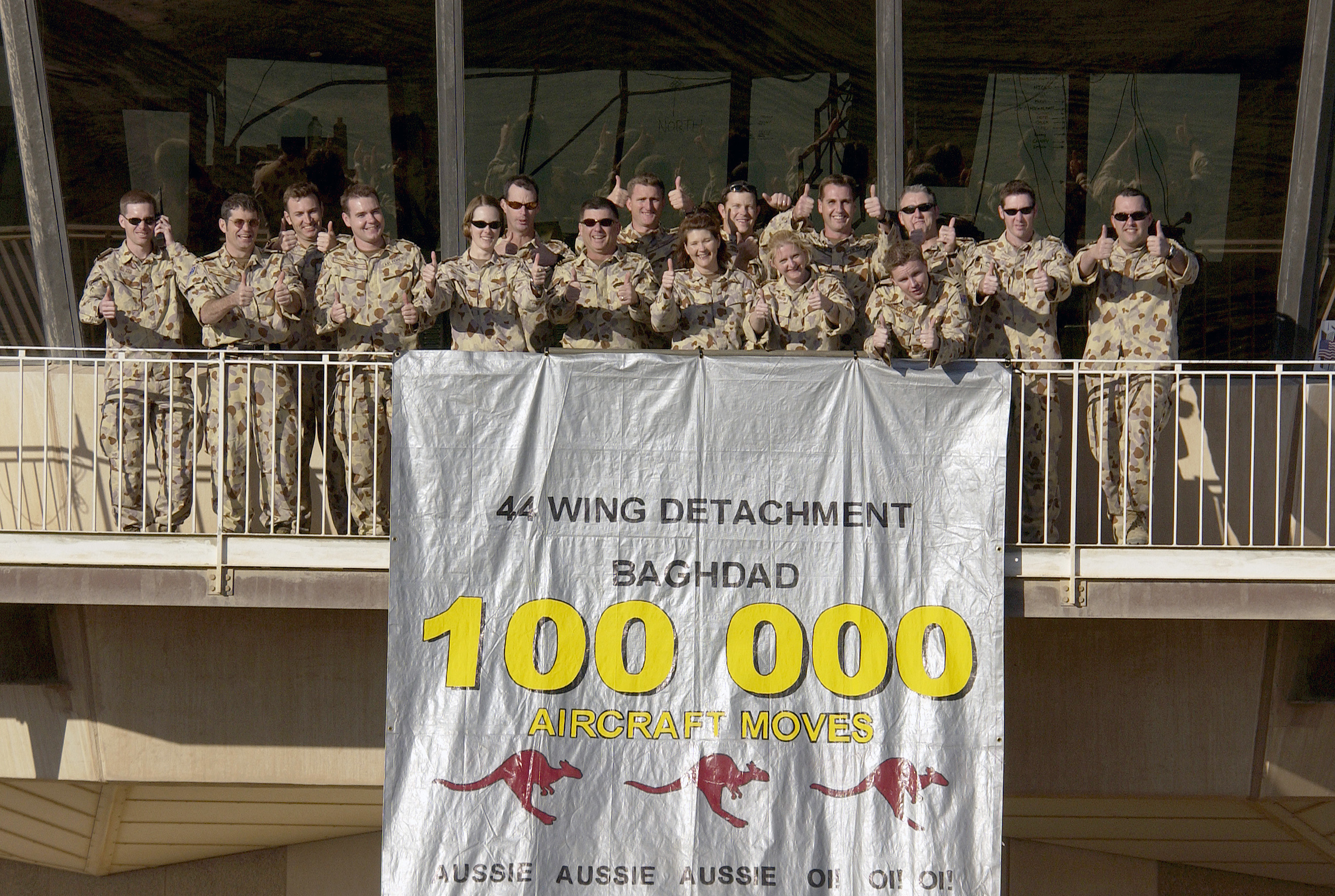
Members of the No. 44 Wing detachment responsible for air traffic control at Baghdad International Airport celebrate their 100,000th air movement in January 2004

On 27 November 2000, the air traffic control (ATC) elements of No. 41 Wing were split off to become a re-formed No. 44 Wing, with headquarters at RAAF Base Williamtown, New South Wales. Responsible for ATC services to the Australian Defence Force, the new wing controlled eleven detachments throughout the country at RAAF, Royal Australian Navy and Australian Army airfields, as well as Darwin and Townsville international airports.

In August 2008 it was reported that No. 44 Wing had 237 air traffic controllers and was below its target strength and having difficulty retaining controllers. As a result, the RAAF was unable to monitor the movements of all its planes.

On 16 February 2011, No. 452 Squadron and No. 453 Squadron were re-raised as subordinate units of No. 44 Wing. The two squadrons were to command the existing RAAF air traffic control detachments at Australian Defence Force-run airports, freeing No. 44 Wing Headquarters to focus on higher-level tasks. In December 2012 the wing had a strength of 500 personnel, including 280 JBACs. Many of the wing's other personnel are technicians who are responsible for setting up and maintaining the unit's specialised equipment.

In February 2013, No. 44 Wing and two other former radar wings of World War II, Nos. 41 and 42, celebrated their 70th anniversaries at Williamtown, where the Governor of New South Wales, Marie Bashir, was guest of honour. As of then, No. 44 Wing staff were deployed in Afghanistan. Since its re-establishment in 2000, its detachments have also deployed to Sudan, East Timor, Iraq, the Solomon Islands, and Indonesia.
