= No. 41 Wing RAAF =

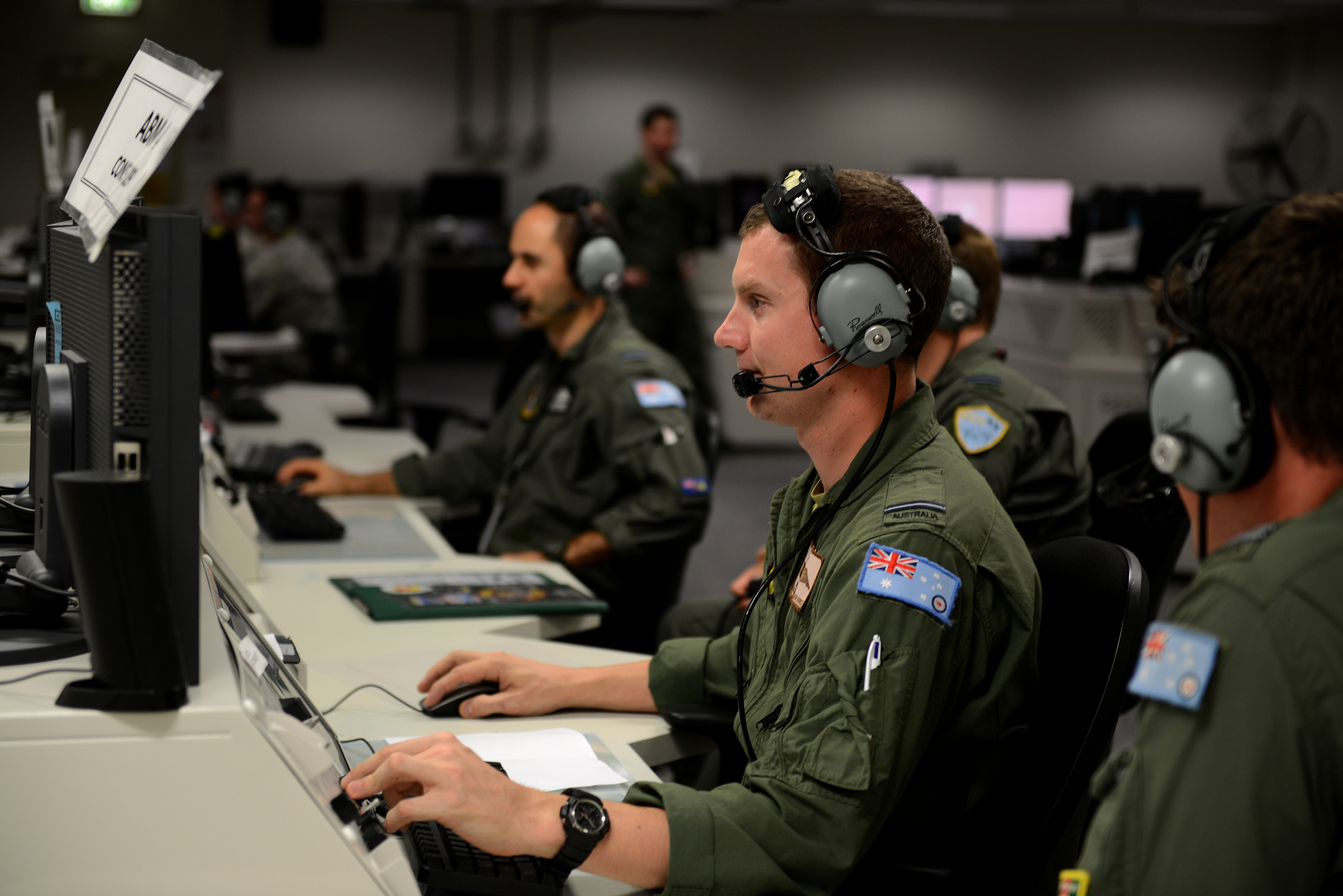
- No. 41 Wing air battle managers during an exercise in 2017
- Active: 1943–
- Country: Australia
- Branch: Royal Australian Air Force
- Role: Surveillance & air defence
- Part of: Surveillance & Response Group
- Base: RAAF Base Williamtown
- Motto: "Pass Not Unseen"

No. 41 Wing of the RAAF is one of four wings attached to the Royal Australian Air Force's Surveillance and Response Group. The others are Nos. 42, 44 and 92 Wings. The No. 41 Wing Unit is divided into four sub units that are responsible for Air Surveillance both within Australia and abroad; No. 1 Remote Sensor Unit (1 RSU), No. 3 Control and Reporting Unit (3 CRU), No. 114 Mobile Control and Reporting Unit (114 MCRU) and the Surveillance and Control Training Unit (SACTU). No. 2 Squadron was transferred to the wing in September 2023 when No. 42 Wing was disbanded.

Component units:

- No. 1 Remote Sensor Unit RAAF
- No. 2 Squadron RAAF
- No. 3 Control and Reporting Unit RAAF
- No. 114 Mobile Control and Reporting Unit RAAF
- Surveillance and Control Training Unit RAAF
