= RAAF Base Williamtown =

Royal Australian Air Force base in New South Wales

- Part of Newcastle Airport
- Williamtown, New South Wales in Australia
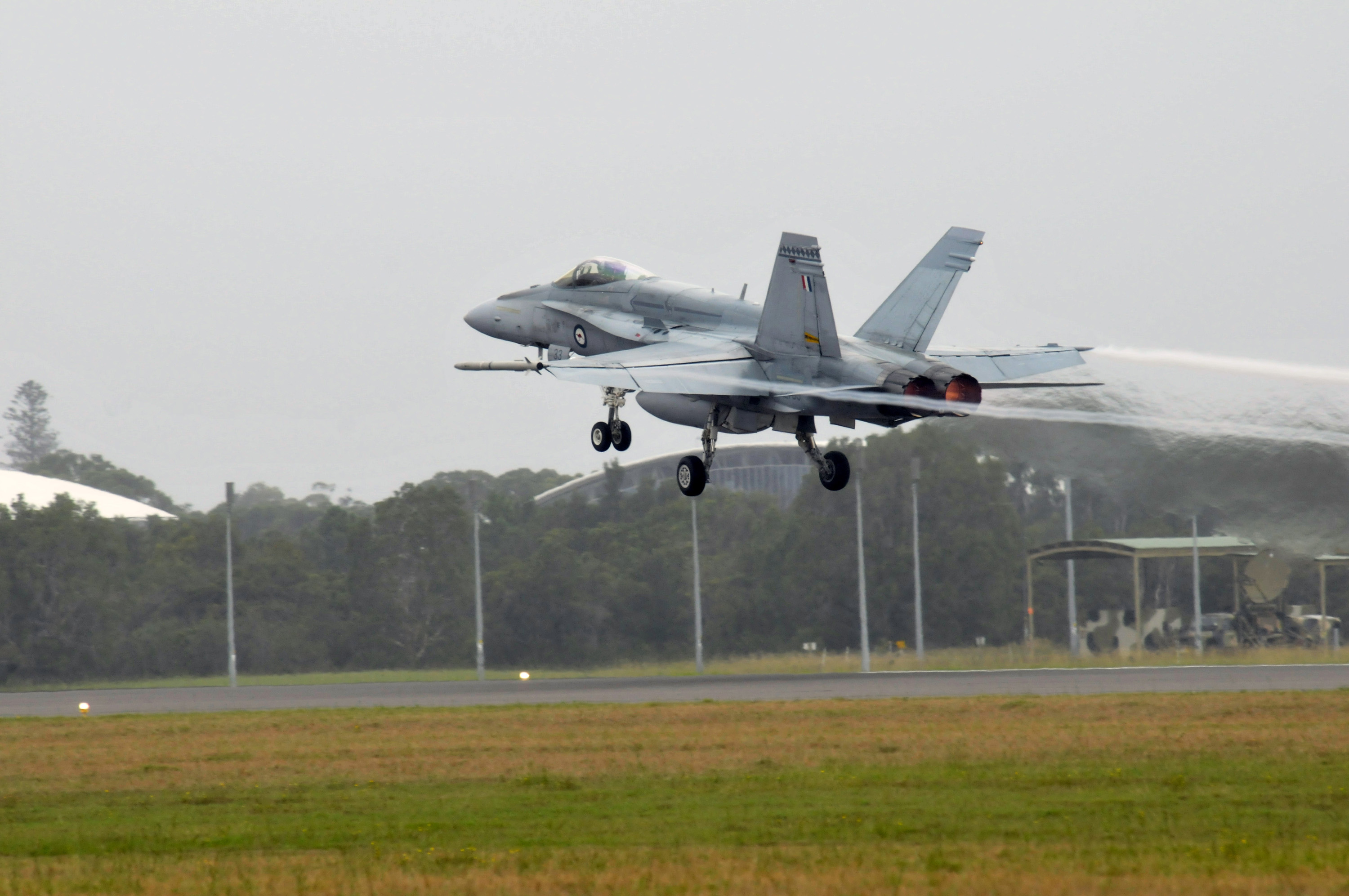
- F/A-18 Hornet taking off from RAAF Base Williamtown

Site information
- Type: Military air base
- Owner: Department of Defence
- Operator: Royal Australian Air Force
- Website: RAAF Base Williamtown

Location
- Location of RAAF Williamtown in New South Wales
- Coordinates: 32°47′42″S 151°50′04″E

Site history
- In use: 15 February 1941 – present

Garrison information
- Garrison: Headquarters Air Combat Group; Headquarters Surveillance and Response Group
- Occupants: No. 81 Wing; No. 78 Wing; No. 453 Squadron Williamtown Flight; No. 3 Squadron; No. 77 Squadron; No. 2 Operational Conversion Unit; No. 76 Squadron; No. 4 Squadron; No. 2 Squadron; No. 2 Expeditionary Health Squadron; No. 1 Combat Communications Squadron Detachment Williamtown; Headquarters No. 453 Squadron; No. 26 (City of Newcastle) Squadron; No. 381 Expeditionary Combat Support Squadron; No. 1 Security Forces Squadron RAAF

Airfield information
- Identifiers: IATA: NTL, ICAO: YWLM
- Elevation: 9 metres (31 ft) AMSL
Runways
Direction	Length and surface
12/30	3,058 metres (10,033 ft) Asphalt
- Sources: Australian AIP and aerodrome chart

RAAF Base Williamtown (IATA: NTL, ICAO: YWLM) is a Royal Australian Air Force (RAAF) military air base located 8 nautical miles (15 km; 9.2 mi) north of Newcastle in New South Wales, Australia. The base serves as the headquarters to both the Air Combat Group and the Surveillance and Response Group of the RAAF.

The base operates a single runway which is shared with Newcastle Airport with the Department of Defence leasing rights to use the runway.

== History ==
RAAF Station Williamtown was established on 15 February 1941 to provide protection for the strategic port and steel manufacturing facilities in Newcastle. The base originally had four runways, each 1,100 m (3,600 ft) in length to meet the needs of the Williamtown Flying School. The school consisted of 62 buildings which accommodated 366 officers and men.

A number of Australian Empire Air Training Scheme squadrons were formed at Williamtown before proceeding overseas and No. 4 Operational Training Unit was located at Williamtown from October 1942 until the unit was disbanded in April 1944. Following World War II, Williamtown was retained as the RAAF's main fighter base and was equipped with squadrons of Gloster Meteor and CAC Sabre fighters.

In 1961, the squadron of Meteors were replaced with the Dassault Mirage IIIs. On-base facilities were gradually expanded post war and through until the late 1960s.

In 1983, the role of Williamtown was upgraded to a tactical fighter base in preparation of the replacement of the Mirages with 75 F/A-18 Hornets in 1989. The following year, Williamtown became headquarters for the Tactical Fighter group and acquired new headquarter buildings, hangars, workshops, stores, medical facilities and a base chapel.

== Base Activity ==
RAAF Williamtown has several aircraft operating within it, including Boeing E-7 Wedgetail Airborne Early Warning and Control Aircraft, F-35A Multirole Fighter, Hawk 127 Trainer, and PC-21 Trainer aircraft all operated by various squadrons. Williamtown formerly operated F/A-18 Hornets and Pilatus PC-9 Trainers.

RAAF Base Williamtown has sporting fields, recreation facilities, cinema and a fortnightly newspaper. RAAF Williamtown is the home to Fighter World, a museum dedicated to Australian fighter aircraft.

In 2014, the Australian Government announced that Williamtown would be the home base for the F-35 Lightning II Joint Strike Fighters; the first of which arrived in December 2018, and entered service with the RAAF in 2020. Redevelopment works to prepare the base for the F-35, including a 2000 ft runway extension, began in January 2015. This runway extension allows fighters to take off without the use of their afterburners, minimising noise for local communities. Fifty-six of the seventy-two F35s will be based at Williamtown.

The use of firefighting chemicals over a sustained period has resulted in contamination of the groundwater in the area surrounding the base, with residents initiating a class action lawsuit and expressing ongoing concern in national media over the impact on their properties. Nationally, there are 90 sites impacted by PFAS contamination, with more internationally.

The viewing area on the east side of the airport is a popular place for people to watch airplanes' movements

== Units ==
The following units are located at RAAF Base Williamtown:

Unit	Full name	Force Element Group	Wing	Aircraft	Notes
1ATS DET WLM	No. 1 Air Terminal Squadron Detachment Williamtown	Combat Support Group		N/A	
1CCS DET WLM	No. 1 Combat Communications Squadron Detachment Williamtown	Combat Support Group		N/A	
1RSU	No. 1 Remote Sensor Unit	Surveillance and Response Group		N/A	
1SECFOR	No. 1 Security Forces Squadron	Combat Support Group		N/A	
2SQN	No. 2 Squadron	Surveillance and Response Group	42	E-7A	
2EHS	No. 2 Expeditionary Health Squadron	Combat Support Group		N/A	
2OCU	No. 2 Operational Conversion Unit	Air Combat Group	81	F-35A	
3SQN	No. 3 Squadron	Air Combat Group	81	F-35A	
4SQN	No. 4 Squadron	Air Combat Group	78	PC-21	
3CRU	No. 3 Control and Reporting Unit	Surveillance and Response Group		N/A	
26SQN	No. 26 (City of Newcastle) Squadron	Combat Support Group		N/A	Airbase operations
HQ453SQN	Headquarters No. 453 Squadron	Surveillance and Response Group		N/A	Airbase operations
453SQN WLM FLT	No. 453 Squadron Williamtown Flight	Surveillance and Response Group		N/A	Airbase operations
76SQN	No. 76 Squadron	Air Combat Group	78	BAE-Hawk 127	Airbase operations
77SQN	No. 77 Squadron	Air Combat Group	81	F-35A	Airbase operations
278SQN	No. 278 Squadron	Air Combat Group		N/A	
381ECSS	No. 381 Expeditionary Combat Support Squadron	Combat Support Group		N/A	Contingency operations
CSU-WLM	Combat Support Unit – Williamtown	Combat Support Group		N/A	
HQ41WG	Headquarters No. 41 Wing	Surveillance and Response Group		N/A	
HQ42WG	Headquarters No. 42 Wing	Surveillance and Response Group		N/A	
HQ44WG	Headquarters No. 44 Wing	Surveillance and Response Group		N/A	
HQ78WG	Headquarters No. 78 Wing	Air Combat Group		N/A	
HQ81WG	Headquarters No. 81 Wing	Air Combat Group		N/A	
HQACG	Headquarters Air Combat Group	Air Combat Group		N/A	
HQSRG	Surveillance and Response Group	Surveillance and Response Group		N/A	
SACTU	Surveillance and Control Training Unit	Surveillance and Response Group		N/A	
335SQN AAFC	No. 335 Squadron Australian Air Force Cadets	Australian Air Force Cadets		N/A	
AEWCSPO	Airborne Early Warning Control System Program Office	Capability Acquisition and Sustainment Group		N/A	
GTESPO	Ground Telecommunications Equipment Systems Program Office	Capability Acquisition and Sustainment Group		N/A	
TFSPO	Tactical Fighter System Program Office	Capability Acquisition and Sustainment Group		N/A	
