= Boeing E-7 Wedgetail =

Airborne early warning and control aircraft

E-7 Wedgetail
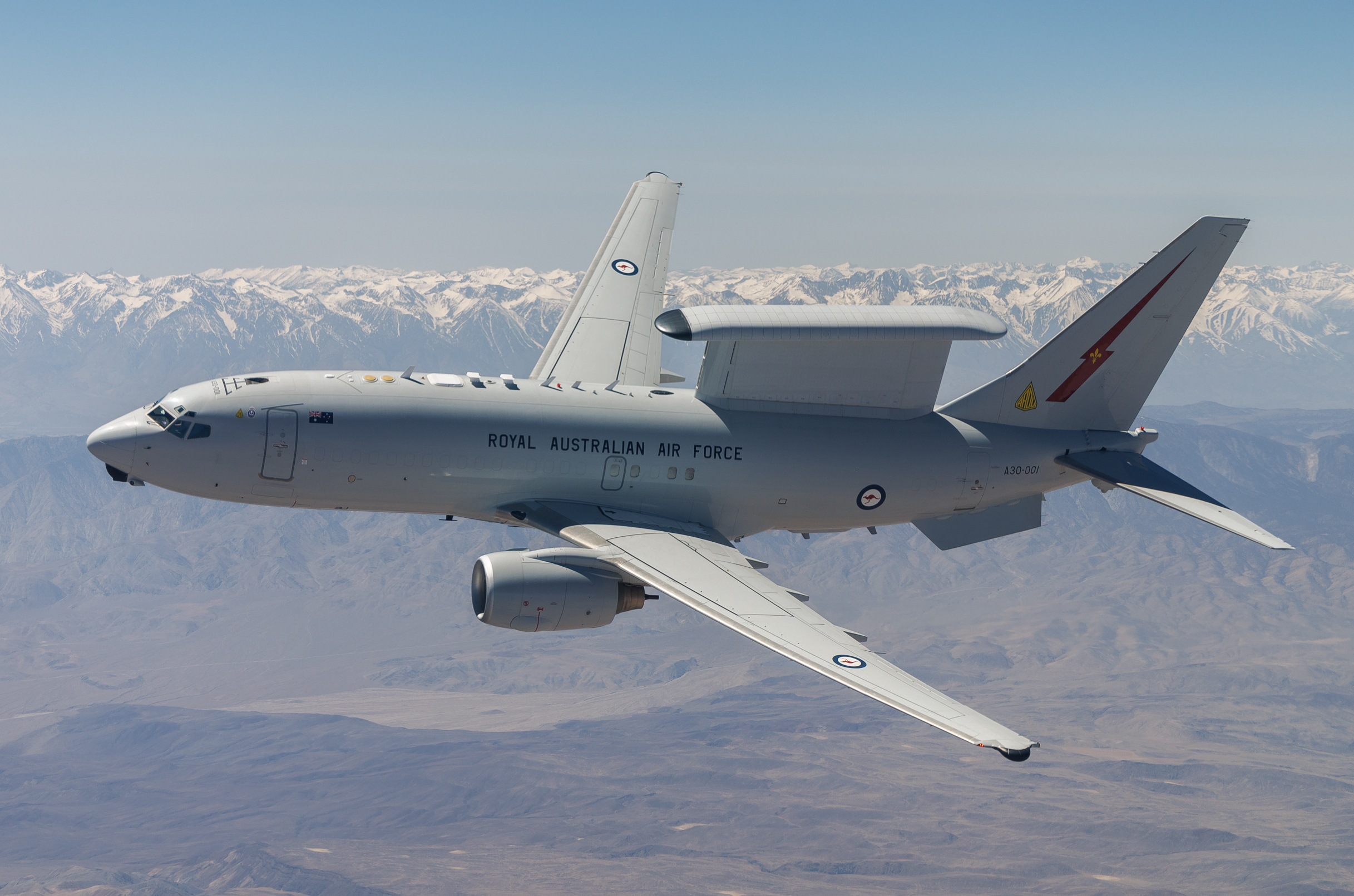
- A Royal Australian Air Force Boeing E-7A Wedgetail

General information
- Type: Airborne early warning and control (AEW&C)
- National origin: Australia; United States
- Manufacturer: Boeing Defense, Space & Security
- Status: In service
- Primary users: Royal Australian Air Force: Turkish Air Force; Republic of Korea Air Force; Royal Air Force
- Number built: 15

History
- Introduction date: November 2012
- First flight: 2004
- Developed from: Boeing 737 Next Generation

The Boeing E-7 Wedgetail, also marketed as the Boeing 737 AEW&C, is a twin-engine airborne early warning and control aircraft originally designed for the Royal Australian Air Force (RAAF). Based on the Boeing 737 Next Generation design, it has a fixed active electronically scanned array (AESA) radar antenna instead of a rotating one as with the 707-based Boeing E-3 Sentry. The E-7 was designed for the RAAF under "Project Wedgetail" and designated E-7A Wedgetail.

The 737 AEW&C has also been selected by the Turkish Air Force (under "Project Peace Eagle", Turkish: Barış Kartalı, designated E-7T), the Republic of Korea Air Force ("Project Peace Eye", 피스 아이), and the United Kingdom (designated Wedgetail AEW Mk1).

The United States Air Force (USAF) had previously announced that the E-7 would replace the E-3 starting from 2027, but in June 2025 the Defense Department announced that they planned to cancel the purchase in favor of space-based solutions, including the proposed Golden Dome, and the E-2D Advanced Hawkeye. In the Continuing Appropriations Act of 2026 passed by the US Congress in November 2025, additional funding was allocated to keep E-7 development on track.

== Design and development ==
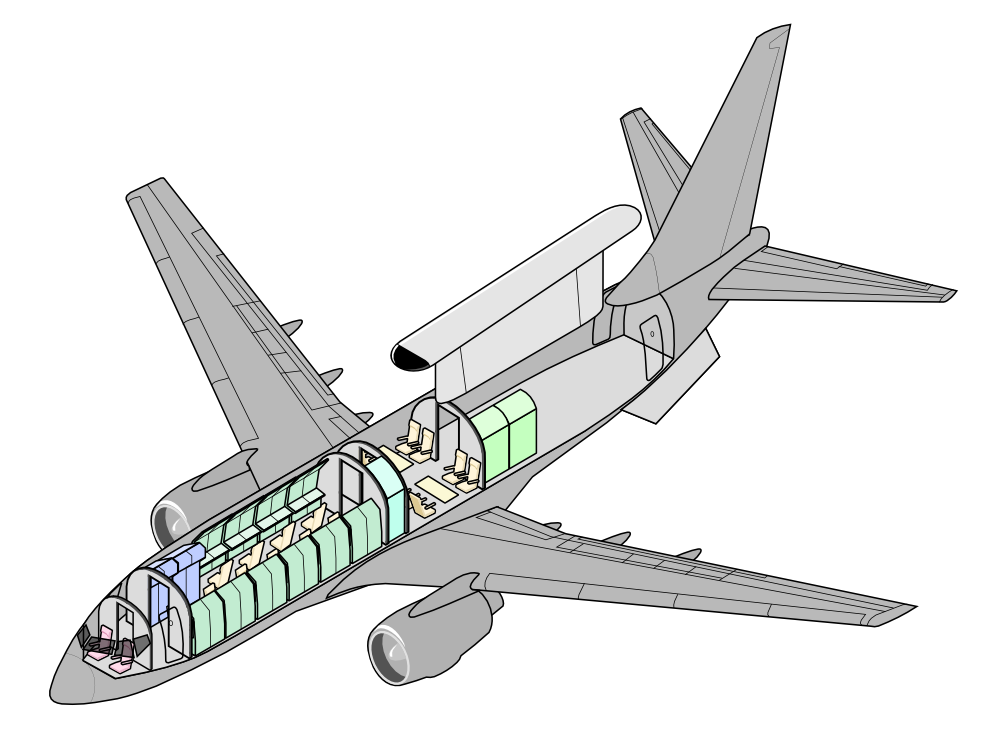
Cutaway drawing

As early as 1986, the Australian Department of Defence evaluated industry proposals for airborne surveillance and early warning systems. In 1994, further studies led to the approval of the first phase of Project AIR 5077. In 1996, Australia issued a request for proposal (RFP) for the aircraft for the RAAF under Project Wedgetail, which refers to the indigenous eagle. In 1999, Australia awarded Boeing Integrated Defense Systems a contract to supply four AEW&C aircraft with options for three additional aircraft.

The 737 AEW&C is roughly similar to the 737-700ER. It uses the Northrop Grumman Electronic Systems Multi-role Electronically Scanned Array (MESA) radar. The electronically scanned AEW and surveillance radar is located on a dorsal fin on top of the fuselage, dubbed the "top hat", and is designed for minimal aerodynamic effect. The radar is capable of simultaneous air and sea search, fighter control and area search, with a maximum range of over 600 kilometres (370 mi) (look-up mode). The MESA radar is fixed, unlike the hydraulically rotated AN/APY-1/2 of the E-3 Sentry, which the 737 AEW&C is set to replace. Despite this, the radar is still able to offer 360-degree azimuth scan using two broadside (side-emitting) electronic manifold arrays, each covering a 120° sector to starboard and port, and an end-fire array housed within the top hat that covers a 60° front and aft of the aircraft.

The radar antenna array also serves as an ELINT array, with a maximum range of over 850 kilometres (530 mi) at 9,000 metres (30,000 ft) altitude. Radar signal processing equipment and a central computer are installed directly below the antenna array.

Other modifications include ventral fins to counterbalance the radar and countermeasures mounted on the nose, wingtips and tail. Inflight refueling is via a receptacle on top of the forward fuselage. The cabin has eight operator consoles with sufficient space for four more. The Australian fleet will operate ten consoles with space for two more, four on the starboard side and six on the port side.

== Operational history ==
=== Australia ===
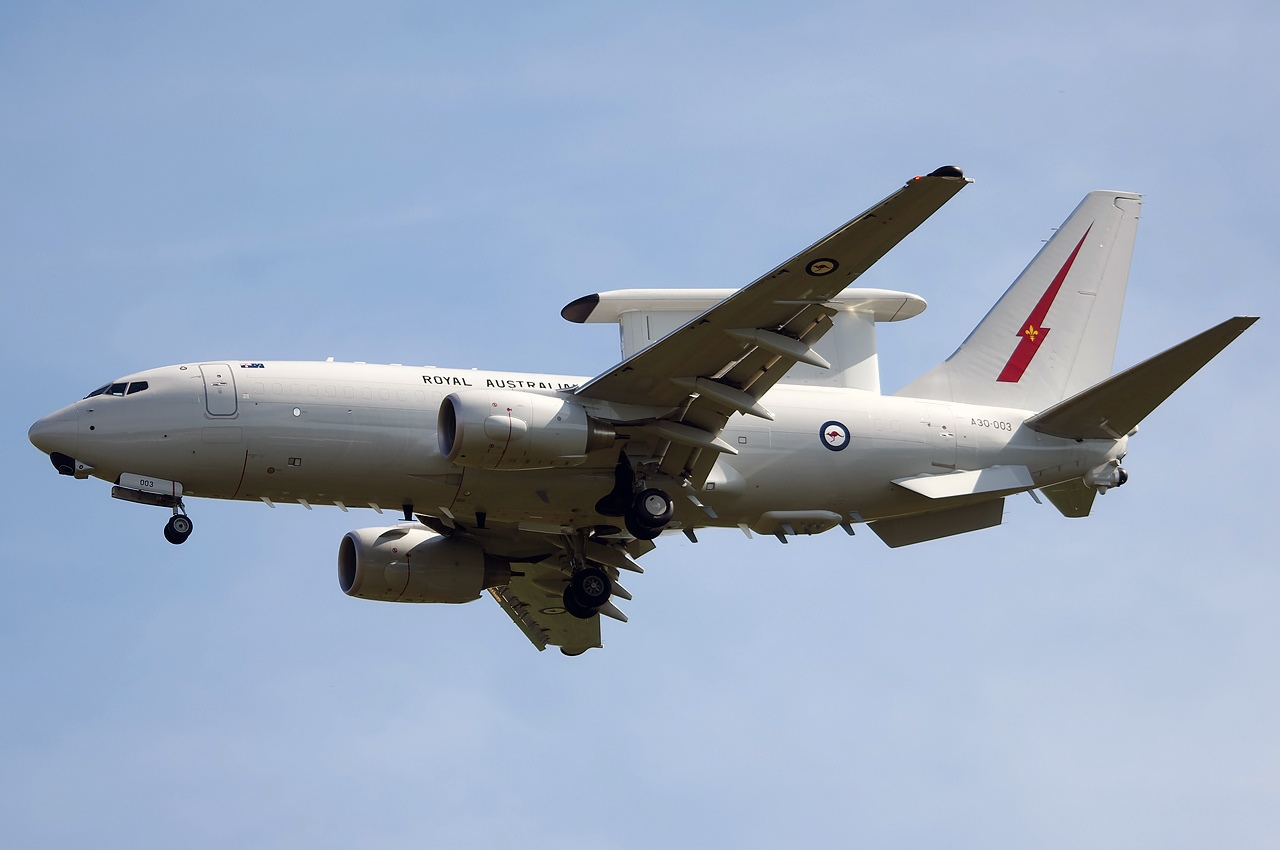
A Royal Australian Air Force Wedgetail

Australia ordered four AEW&C aircraft with options for three additional aircraft, two of which have since been taken up. The first two Wedgetails were assembled, modified and tested in Seattle, Washington, while the remainder were modified by Boeing Australia, with deliveries once set to begin in 2006. Boeing and Northrop teamed with Boeing Australia, and BAE Systems Australia. Boeing Australia provides training, maintenance and support, BAE provides EWSP systems, Electronic Support Measures (ESM) systems and ground support systems.

In June 2006, the Australian Minister for Defence, Brendan Nelson, stated that the Wedgetail was delayed despite Boeing's prior assurance that work was on schedule. Boeing announced an 18-month delay due to problems integrating radar and sensor systems, and did not expect delivery until early 2009. Boeing incurred $770 million (~$1.18 billion in 2025) in charges over the delay in 2006. In June 2008, Boeing announced a further delay due to integration issues with the radar and ESM systems.

In November 2009, Boeing delivered the first two 737 AEW&Cs to the RAAF. These aircraft remained Boeing owned and operated prior to the RAAF's formal acceptance in May 2010. The RAAF accepted its sixth and last 737 AEW&C in June 2012. All RAAF Wedgetails are operated by No. 2 Squadron RAAF and based at RAAF Base Williamtown. In November 2012, the Wedgetail achieved Initial Operational Capability.

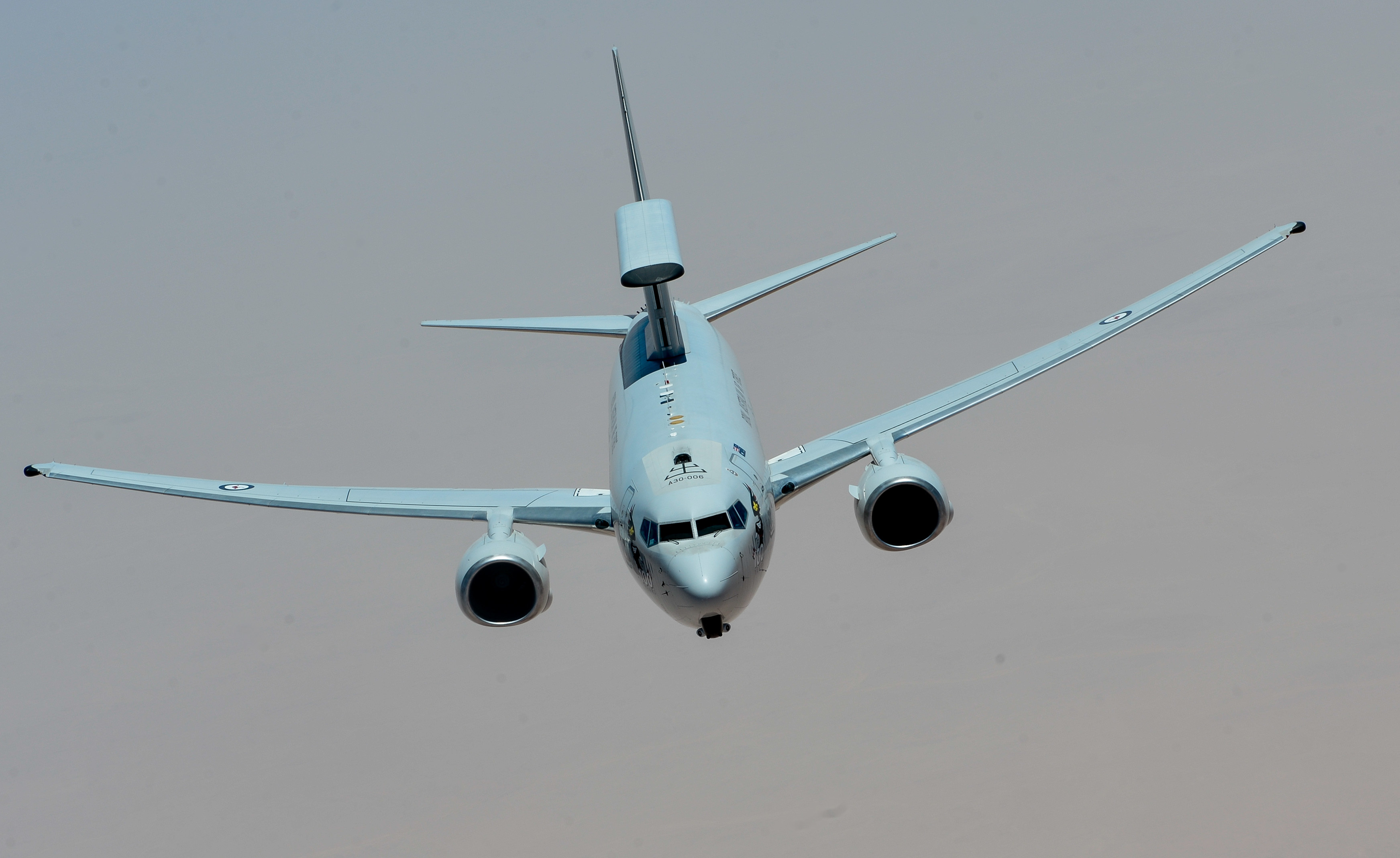
A RAAF Wedgetail flying over the Middle East, 2017

On 1 April 2014, the Wedgetail's first operational sortie occurred in the search for Malaysia Airlines Flight 370, helping control maritime patrol aircraft off Western Australia's coast. On 1 October 2014, a Wedgetail conducted the first Australian sortie over Iraq supporting coalition forces conducting airstrikes against Islamic State (ISIL). In May 2015, the Wedgetail fleet achieved final operational capability (FOC).

In November 2015, the Wedgetail performed the longest Australian command and control mission in a war zone during a 17-hour, 6-minute combat mission, requiring two air-to-air refuelings to stay aloft. Australian Wedgetail crews routinely perform 13-hour missions. In early April 2016, Rotation 5 of aircrew and maintenance personnel that had been operating the RAAF Wedgetail in the Middle East, achieved a record 100 percent mission success rate in Coalition operations against ISIS. The E-7A successfully conducted all 36 missions, each lasting upwards of 12 hours, amounting to nearly 500 hours of flying for the one aircraft. The final Wedgetail rotation to the Middle East ended in early 2019.

In October 2023, an Australian Wedgetail was deployed to Europe to contribute to international efforts to protect the flow of supplies to Ukraine following the Russian invasion of the country. The deployment was scheduled to last for six months. The Wedgetail returned to Australia in early April 2024. A second RAAF Wedgetail deployment to Europe began in August 2025.

The Australian Government's 2024 Integrated Investment Program included a commitment to allocate $A5 billion to $A7 billion to replace the Wedgetail fleet between the 2024–25 and 2033–34 financial years.

On 10 March 2026, the Australian government announced that an E-7A Wedgetail aircraft and 85 supporting personnel would be deployed to the United Arab Emirates as part of the Australian involvement in the 2026 Iran war. The Wedgetail will likely operate from the Al Minhad Air Base.

=== Turkey ===
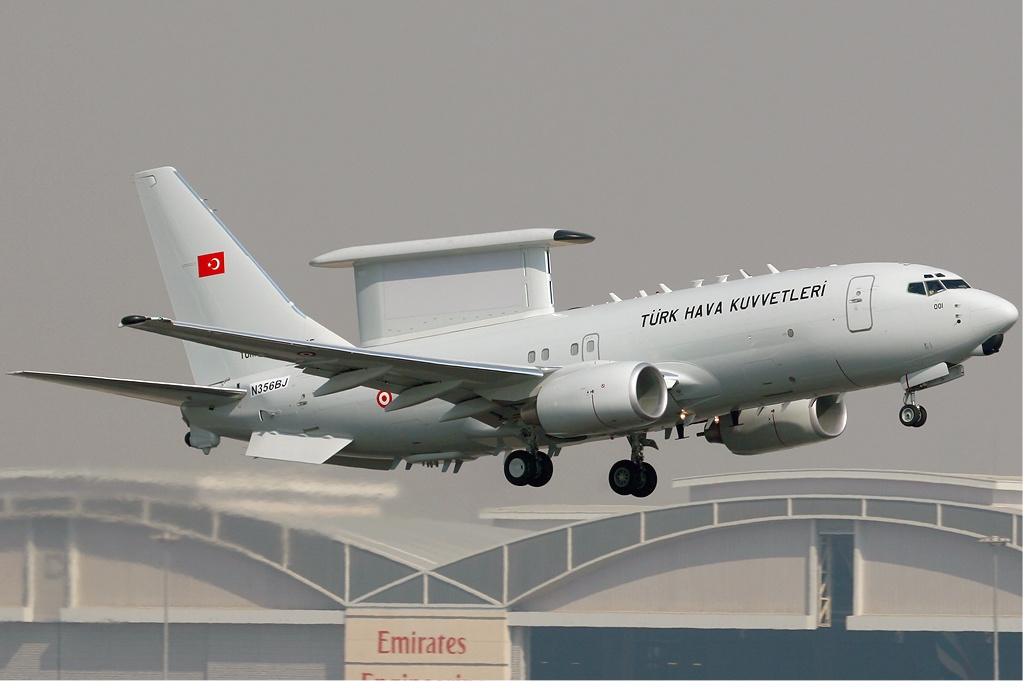
A Boeing 737 AEW&C of the Turkish Air Force

Four Boeing 737 AEW&C Peace Eagle aircraft along with ground support systems were ordered by the Turkish Air Force, with an option for two more. Turkish Aerospace Industries (TAI) is the Peace Eagle's primary subcontractor, performing parts production, testing, aircraft assembly and conversion. Another Turkish subcontractor, HAVELSAN, is responsible for ground support elements, system analysis and software support. HAVELSAN is the only foreign company licensed by the U.S. government to receive critical source codes. Peace Eagle 1 was modified and tested by Boeing in the US. Peace Eagle 2, 3 and 4 were modified and tested at TAI's facilities in Ankara, Turkey, in partnership with Boeing and several Turkish companies. In 2006, the four Peace Eagles were scheduled to be delivered in 2008.

In September 2007, Boeing completed the first Peace Eagle test flight. In June 2008, it was announced that Peace Eagle 2, the second 737 AEW&C, had completed modifications. Flight and mission system checks were completed in the third quarter of 2008. In 2013, Israel delivered EW equipment for the Peace Eagle under US pressure. On 21 February 2014, the first Peace Eagle, named Kuzey (meaning North), was formally accepted by the Turkish Air Force. The remaining three aircraft are named Güney (South), Doğu (East) and Batı (West). The fourth and final Peace Eagle was delivered in December 2015.

In IDEF 2023 was a signed project contract, for the modernization of the E-7 Peace Eagle aircraft in the inventory of Turkish Air Force to meet the current operational needs of Air Force and to eliminate the obsolescence in the software. Within the scope of modernization, the aircraft will be equipped with IFF Mode 5 Responder, Karetta CRPA Antenna, Mission Computer Hardware developed by Aselsan.

=== South Korea ===
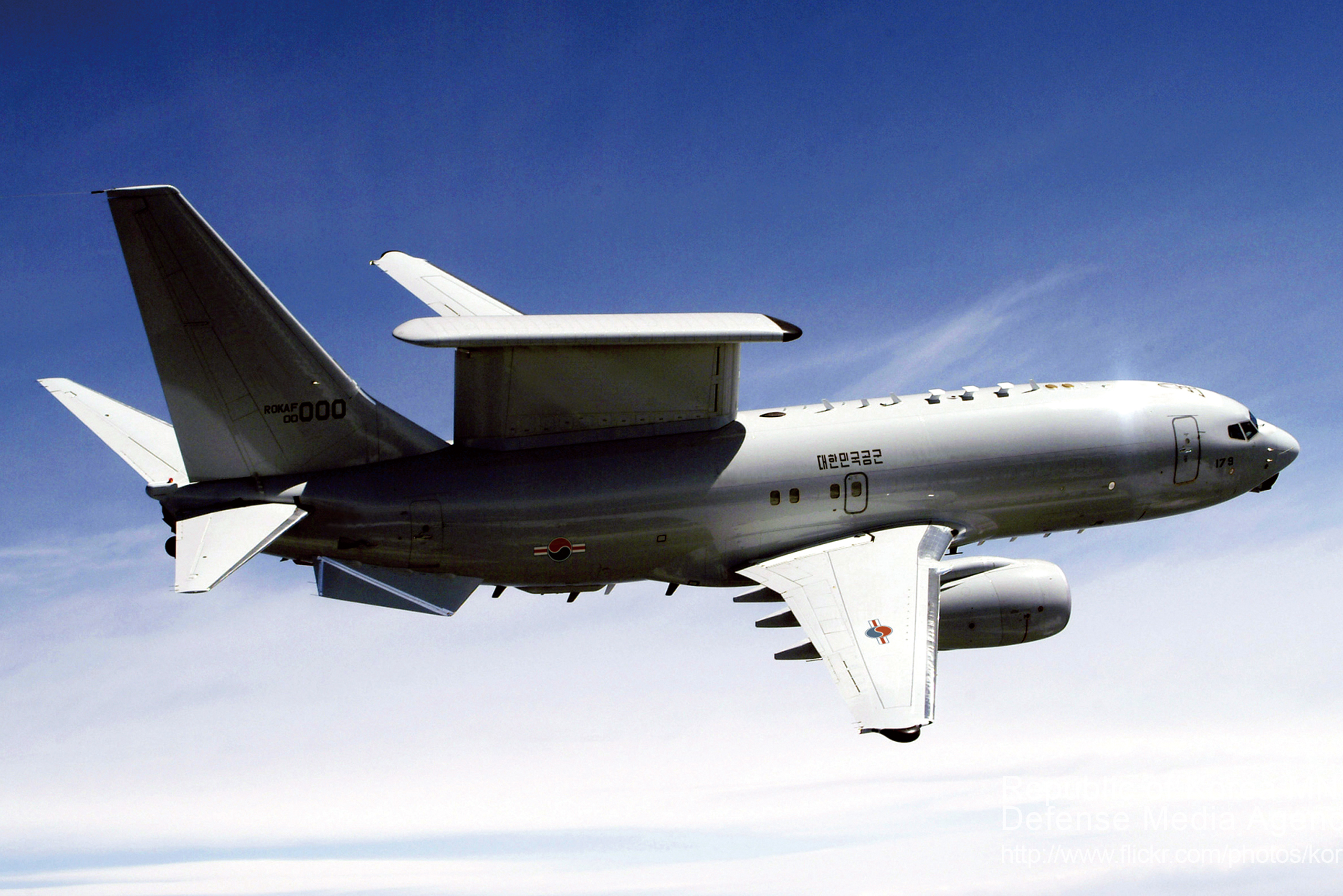
A Republic of Korea Air Force Boeing 737 AEW&C

In November 2006, Boeing won a $1.6 billion contract with South Korea to deliver four aircraft by 2012. Boeing beat the other entrant, IAI Elta's Gulfstream G550-based aircraft, which was eliminated from the competition in August 2006. The first Peace Eye aircraft was delivered to Gimhae Air Base, Busan for acceptance testing in August 2011 with the remaining three aircraft delivered every six months until 2012. The second aircraft was modified into an AEW&C configuration by Korea Aerospace Industries (KAI), then delivered to Gimhae Air Base in December 2011. After receiving AEW&C modifications by KAI, the third aircraft was delivered in May 2012 to Gimhae Air Base. The fourth aircraft was delivered in October 2012.

In October 2019, the South Korean newspaper Munwha reported that the four E-7 aircraft had suffered from frequent breakdowns from 2013 to 2019, incurring costs of 350 billion Korean won, comparable to the 400 billion Korean won each aircraft cost to procure. The fleet availability between 2015 and 2019 was 63-73%, below the 75% target operating rate.

In 2023, South Korea initiated a competitive program to acquire four additional AEW&C aircraft. The Boeing E-7, Saab Global Eye, and a L3Harris Gulfstream-based variant competed for the contract, with the L3Harris/ELTA bid winning in 2025.

=== United Kingdom ===
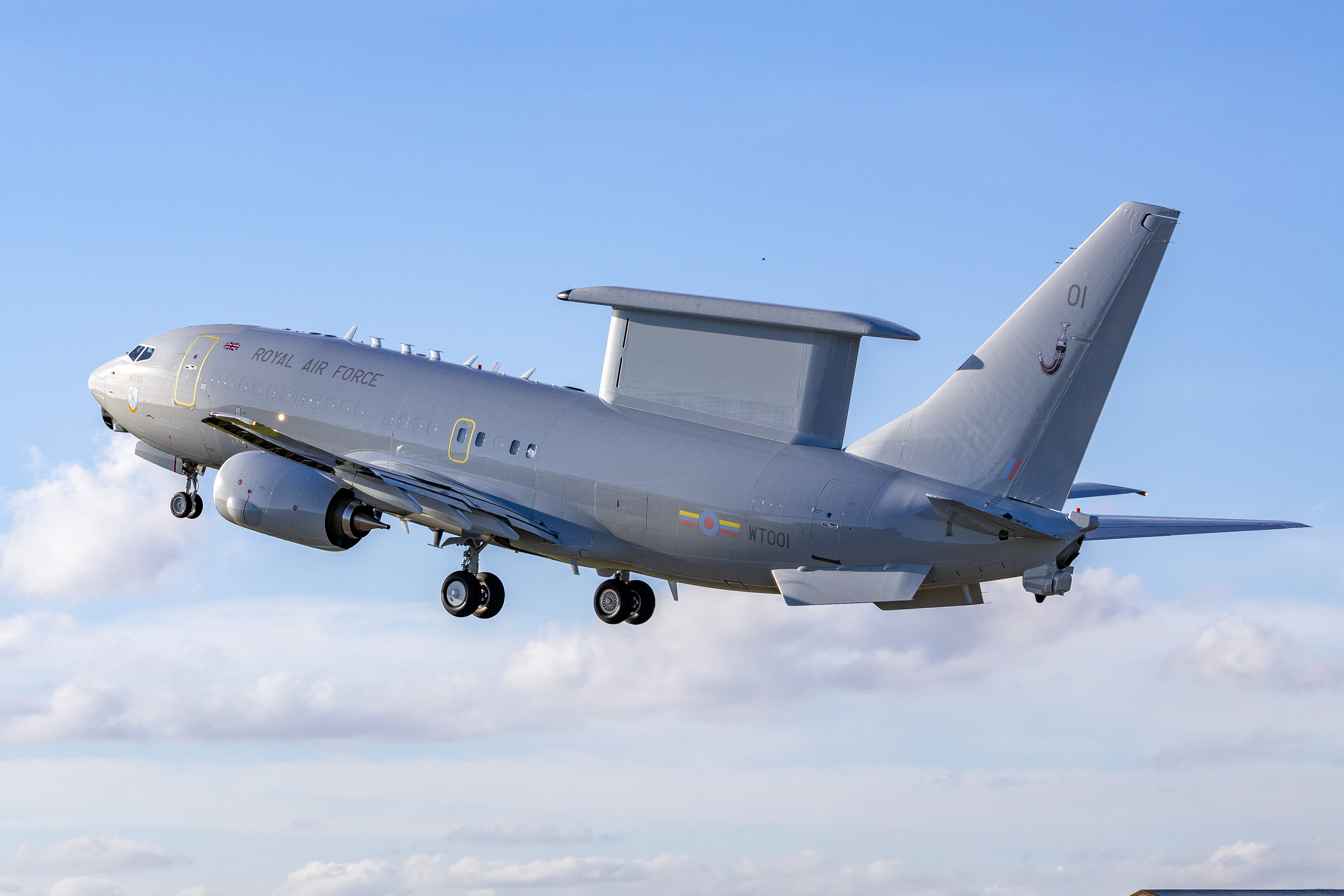
A Wedgetail of the Royal Air Force

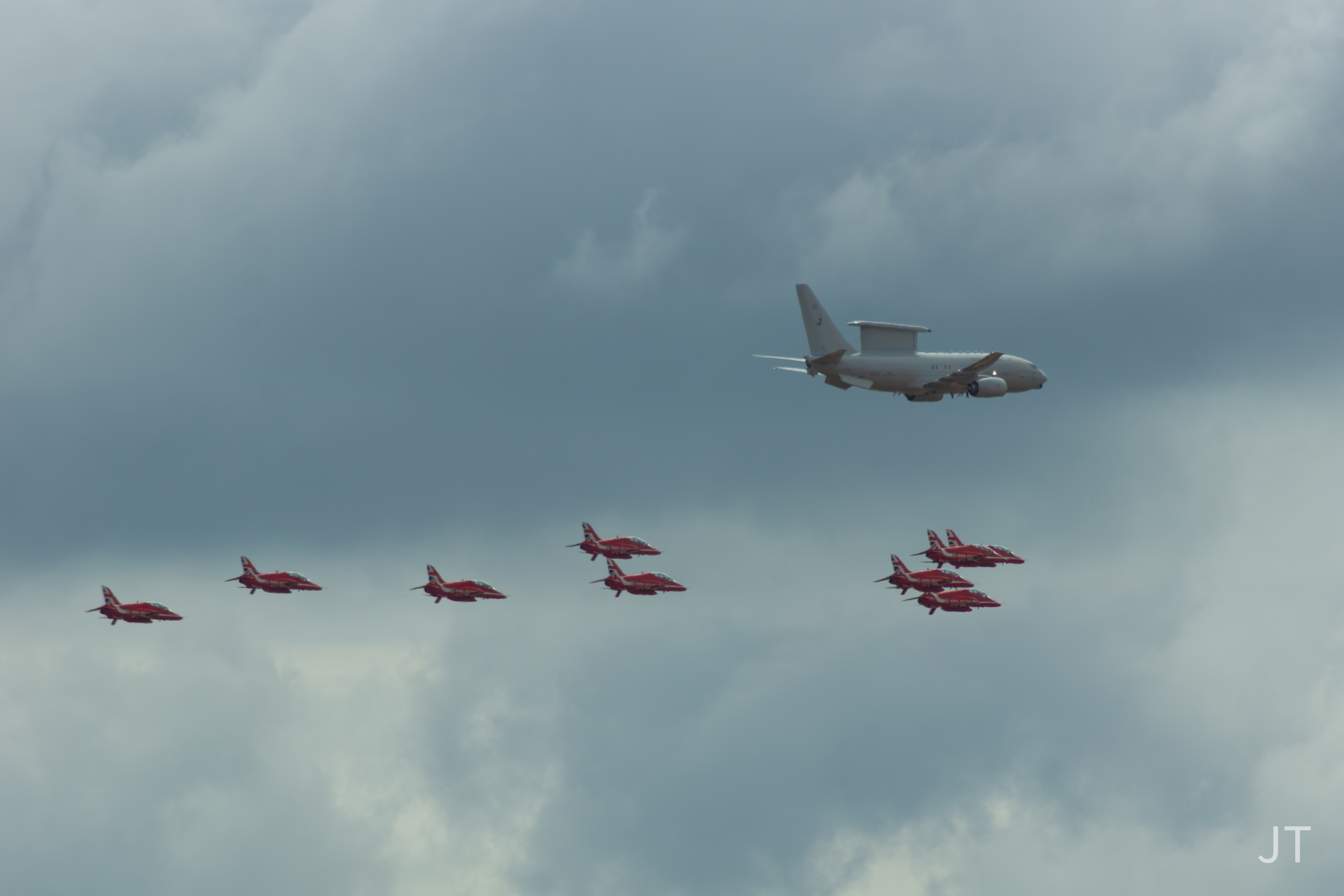
Wedgetail AEW1 of the RAF with the RAF's Red Arrows

In October 2018, the British Government (May ministry) announced that it was in talks with Boeing about the potential for the E-7 Wedgetail to replace its E-3D fleet. Talks about using the aircraft were also taking place with Australia. The apparent decision to proceed with procurement without a competition received some criticism, with the Ministry of Defence accused of displaying favouritism towards Boeing, while Saab voiced its opposition to the "non-competitive" deal as it could offer the Erieye system mounted on Airbus A330 MRTT aircraft. In March 2019, the UK signed a $1.98 billion (~$2.46 billion in 2025) deal to purchase five E-7 Wedgetails. The aircraft will be designated the "Wedgetail AEW1".

Airframe modification was expected to be performed by Marshall Aerospace, but it withdrew in May 2020, thus Boeing selected STS Aviation Group's UK branch on 20 May 2020. Two of the five aircraft are to be converted commercial airliners and the rest are to be new. Each conversion takes about 24 months, with work on the first aircraft starting in 2021 and the last to be completed in 2026. In June 2020, the first Wedgetail delivery was expected in 2023.

In December 2020, Air Forces Monthly reported that the UK was considering reducing its Wedgetail purchase from five to three aircraft and stated that such a move "could often mean just one aircraft would be available for operational tasking." The 2021 Integrated Defence Review confirmed the reduced order of three aircraft. In late 2022, it was reported that initial operating capability for the aircraft had slipped to 2024. Then in 2024 it was indicated that service entry was now anticipated in 2025. The in-service date then slipped further into 2026. In February 2023, Air Chief Marshal Michael Wigston stated that the order of three aircraft may gradually rise back to five airframes. The 2025 defence review recommended the procurement of additional aircraft, though this might proceed in conjunction with other NATO allies.

The first AEW Mk1 was received by the RAF and bore the markings of the No. 8 Squadron RAF, who are operating the aircraft in its first service, on 18 October 2024. It was then seen for the first time in public at the Royal International Air Tattoo in 2025, where it flew in Formation flight with the RAF's Red Arrows display group.

=== United States ===
In February 2021 General Kenneth S. Wilsbach, the Commander of the United States Pacific Air Forces, proposed that the USAF rapidly acquire E-7s to replace the E-3s deployed to the Indo-Pacific region. In March 2022, Wilsbach stated that the E-3 had insufficient detection range against aircraft like the Chinese Chengdu J-20. In April 2021, Aviation Week & Space Technology reported that Gen. Jeffrey Harrigian, commander of U.S. Air Forces in Europe and Air Forces Africa, also voiced support for a near-term E-7 acquisition. In October 2021, the USAF published a "Notice of Contract Action", stating its intent to award Boeing a sole-source contract to study the E-7 to determine if it can meet USAF configuration standards and mandates.

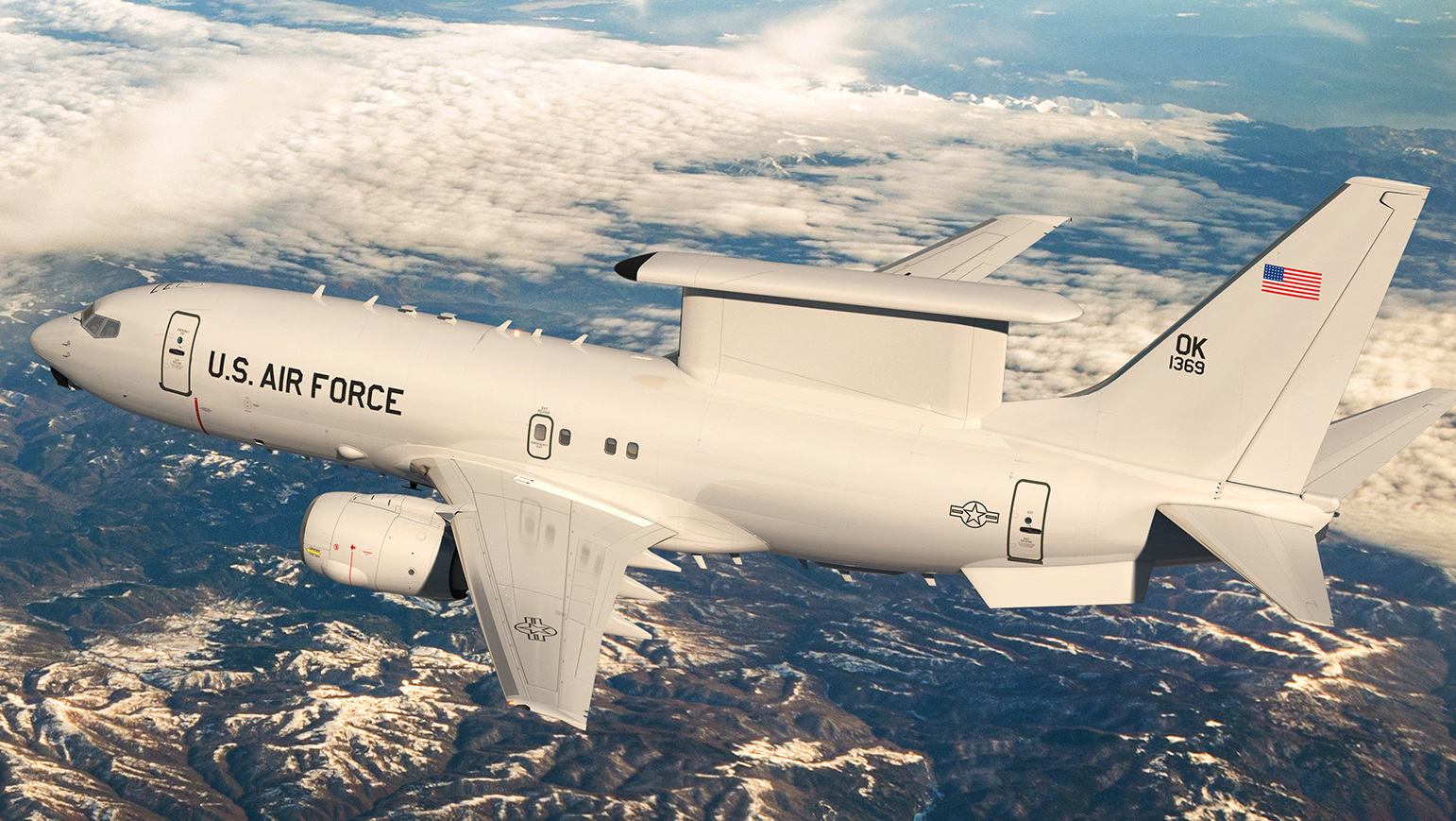
A USAF E-7A in flight, artist's depiction

In April 2022, the USAF announced that the E-7 would replace the E-3, as it "is the only platform capable of meeting the requirements for the Defense Department's tactical battle management, command and control and moving target indication capabilities within the timeframe needed..." In 2023, an initial $1.2 billion contract was awarded to develop two new US-specific variants of the E-7. A final production decision for a total fleet of 26 aircraft was planned for 2025, with the first USAF E-7 intended to enter service in 2027.

In June 2025, it was reported that the Trump Administration was considering cancelling the E-7 procurement due to concerns that the aircraft would be vulnerable in future conflicts. During an appearance before Congress, Secretary of Defense Pete Hegseth gave the E-7 as an example of "systems and platforms that are not survivable in the modern battlefield, or they don't give us an advantage in a future fight" and said that "tough decisions" needed to be made.

On 26 June 2025, it was reported that the USAF had canceled the E-7 program due to ballooning costs and concerns about survivability. The termination, announced as part of the fiscal 2026 budget rollout, came after months of rumors that the program was in danger as the Trump administration increasingly set its sights on instead using space-based capabilities to help warplanes find and track enemy aircraft, known as the air moving target indicator (AMTI) mission. However, in September 2025 it was announced that two existing Boeing 737 passenger aircraft would be significantly overhauled and upgraded to create two prototype early-warning surveillance aircraft for delivery to the USAF.

In March 2026 the USAF awarded Boeing two deals totaling $2.43 billion to continue development of two E-7A prototypes.

In June 2026, the Trump administration requested $1.55 billion in fiscal year 2027 funding to continue the E-7A program, including completion of the two prototype aircraft and development of five engineering and manufacturing development aircraft. The proposal would transfer $651 million from the U.S. Navy's E-2D Hawkeye procurement account and $899 million from classified U.S. Air Force procurement programs. The House Appropriations Committee approved the funding request while restoring the Navy's E-2D procurement funding, stating that both aircraft fulfilled complementary operational roles.

=== Potential customers ===
==== Saudi Arabia ====
As of December 2023, Saudi Arabia was in the middle of a two-phase mid-life upgrade to its existing fleet of E-3 Sentry aircraft. In August 2022, the USAF revealed that Saudi Arabia has expressed interest in the E-7.

=== Failed bids ===
==== Italy ====
In 2004, the Italian Air Force was considering the purchase of a total of 14 Wedgetail and P-8 MMA aircraft, with aircraft support to be provided by Alitalia. In 2008, owing to budget constraints, Italy chose not to proceed with either aircraft and chose a smaller, less expensive, interim solution in place of the P-8, the ATR 72MP. In 2012, Italy acquired two Gulfstream G550 CAEW as part of a counter-deal to Israel's $1 billion (~$1.38 billion in 2025) order for 30 Alenia Aermacchi M-346 advanced jet trainers, followed by an additional order of two more aircraft in 2022.

==== NATO ====
In 2022, NATO issued a "Request for Information" (RFI) for a capability to replace its 14 E-3A AWACS aircraft by 2035, with an "initial operational capability" by 2031. Boeing stated that it had responded to the request, offering an E-7-based solution. Saab and Northrop Grumman also responded to the RFI, offering, the GlobalEye and the Northrop Grumman E-2D Advanced Hawkeye, respectively.

In November 2023, NATO stated that the goal was to procure six E-7s to replace their E-3s, to begin operations in 2031. The E-7 was expected to be based at Geilenkirchen and could have operated from several forward locations across Europe. In November 2025, the Dutch Ministry of Defence on behalf of NATO announced the cancellation of the acquisition of the E-7. Due to the E-7 program losing its "strategic and financial basis" along with the US leaving the program in July has resulted in significant changes to NATO's AWACS program. NATO opted for GlobalEye instead.

==== United Arab Emirates ====
The Wedgetail was a competitor for the United Arab Emirates' AEW&C program in 2007. In 2015, UAE selected the Saab GlobalEye over the Wedgetail and the E-2D Advanced Hawkeye.

==== Qatar ====
In 2014, Qatar stated it planned to purchase three 737 AEW&C aircraft. In 2018, Qatar decided not to proceed with the planned purchase.

==== Canada ====
In April 2024, Canada announced it would be investing CA$5 billion on AEW&C capabilities. The GlobalEye may be a competitor to the E-7. In May 2026, Canada announced it would buy Saab's GlobalEye.

== Operators ==
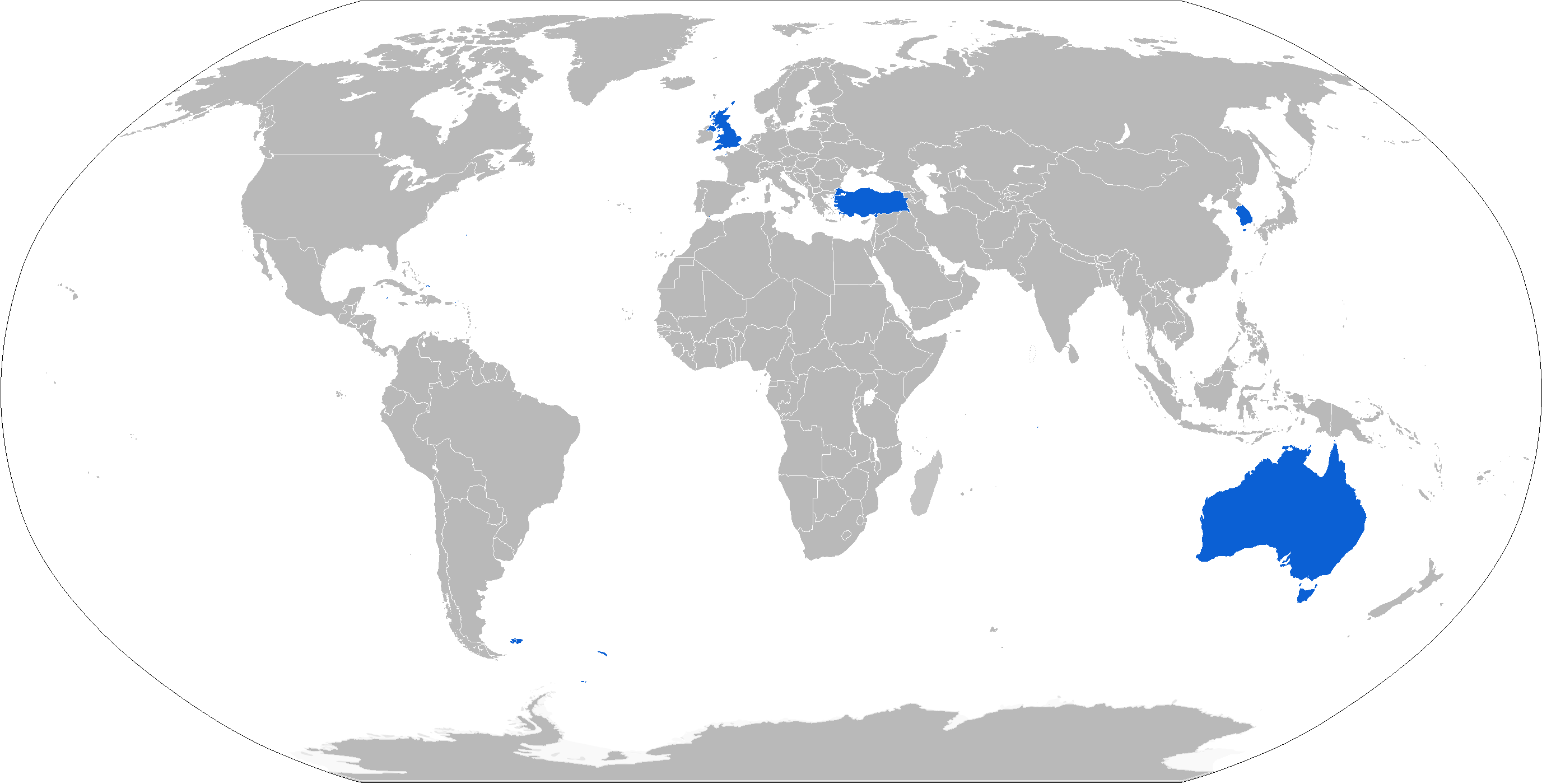
A map with 737 AEW&C operators in blue

Australia

- Royal Australian Air Force – 6 in service, designated "E-7A Wedgetail"
  - RAAF Base Williamtown, New South Wales
    - No. 2 Squadron

South Korea

- Republic of Korea Air Force – 4 in service, designated "Peace Eye".
  - 51st Air Control Group
    - 271th Airborne Air Control Squadron

Turkey

- Turkish Air Force – 4 in service, designated "E-7T Peace Eagle"
  - Airborne Warning Control Group Command.

United Kingdom

- Royal Air Force – 3 on order, with potentially another 2 in the future. Designated "Wedgetail AEW1".
  - No. 8 Squadron - 2 in service

=== Future operators ===
United States

- United States Air Force – 2 aircraft on order. In June 2025, the Pentagon cancelled USAF plans to acquire 26 aircraft, with the September 2025 Continuing Appropriations Act allocating $400 million to continue development of two prototypes.

== Specifications ==
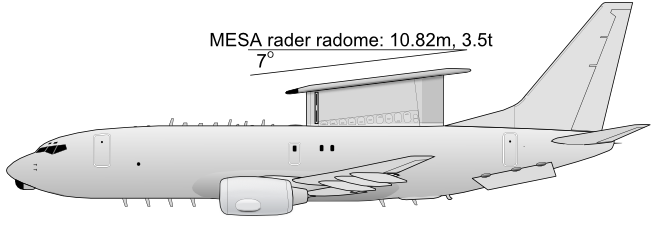
Side view

Data from Boeing

General characteristics

- Crew: Flight crew: 2; mission crew: 19
- Capacity: 43,720 lb (19,830 kg)
- Length: 110 ft 4 in (33.6 m)
- Wingspan: 117 ft 2 in (35.8 m)
- Height: 41 ft 2 in (12.5 m)
- Wing area: 980 sq ft (91 m^{2})
- Airfoil: B737D
- Empty weight: 102,750 lb (46,606 kg)
- Max takeoff weight: 171,000 lb (77,600 kg)
- Powerplant: 2 × CFM International CFM56-7B27A turbofan engines, 27,300 lbf (121 kN) thrust each

Performance

- Cruise speed: 530 mph (853 km/h, 460 kn)
- Range: 4,000 mi (6,500 km, 3,500 nmi)
- Service ceiling: 41,000 ft (12,500 m)

Avionics

- Northrop Grumman Multi-role Electronically Scanned Array radar

== See also ==
Related development

- Boeing 737
- Boeing C-40 Clipper
- Boeing P-8 Poseidon

Aircraft of comparable role, configuration, and era

- Boeing E-767
- Boeing E-3 Sentry
- Embraer R-99
- Gulfstream G550 CAEW
- GlobalEye
