= Surveillance and Response Group RAAF =

Force element group of the Royal Australian Air Force

Surveillance & Response Group
- Active: 30 March 2004 – present
- Branch: RAAF
- Part of: Air Command
- Garrison/HQ: RAAF Base Williamtown
- Motto: Foremost Sentinel

Surveillance and Response Group is a force element group (FEG) of the Royal Australian Air Force with its headquarters at RAAF Base Williamtown. The current commander of SRG is Air Commodore Louise DesJardins.

The group was formed on 30 March 2004 through an amalgamation of Maritime Patrol Group and Surveillance and Control Group. At this time, it had a strength of over 2,100 personnel, and comprised No. 41, No. 44 and No. 92 Wings. No. 42 Wing became part of the group when it was re-formed on 1 January 2006. This wing was disbanded in 2023.
