= List of Royal Australian Air Force installations =

This is a list of current and previous Royal Australian Air Force airstrips, aerodromes and bases. The Air Force also owns and maintains "bare bases" in remote areas of Australia. These bases have runways and buildings, but only a caretaker staff. They are generally only used for exercises as there are no units permanently based there.

== Current bases ==
=== Australian Capital Territory ===
- Air Force Headquarters, Canberra
- Defence Establishment Fairbairn, Canberra

=== New South Wales ===
- RAAF Base Glenbrook, Glenbrook (near Sydney)
- Defence Establishment Orchard Hills, Orchard Hills (near Sydney)
- RAAF Base Richmond, Richmond (near Sydney)
- RAAF Base Wagga, Wagga Wagga
- RAAF Base Williamtown, Williamtown (near Newcastle)

=== Northern Territory ===
- RAAF Base Darwin, Darwin
- RAAF Base Tindal, Katherine

=== Queensland ===
- RAAF Base Amberley, Ipswich (near Brisbane)
- RAAF Scherger near Weipa (bare base)
- RAAF Base Townsville, Townsville

=== South Australia ===
- RAAF Base Edinburgh, Edinburgh (near Adelaide)
- RAAF Woomera Range Complex, a large military and civil aerospace facility in the Far North region
  - RAAF Base Woomera, an air base contained within the complex, near Woomera Village

=== Victoria ===
- RAAF Base East Sale, Sale
- RAAF Williams, Laverton Base, Laverton (near Melbourne)
- RAAF Williams, Point Cook Base, Point Cook (near Melbourne)

=== Western Australia ===
- RAAF Base Curtin near Derby (bare base)
- RAAF Base Gingin, Gingin (airfield only)
- RAAF Base Learmonth near Exmouth (bare base)
- RAAF Base Pearce, Bullsbrook (near Perth)

== Former Headquarters ==
- RAAF Area Combined Headquarters, North-Eastern area, Townsville, Queensland. Relocated from Port Moresby, Papua New Guinea
- RAAF Area Combined Headquarters, North-Western area, Darwin, Northern Territory
- RAAF Area Combined Headquarters, South-Eastern area, Melbourne, Victoria
- RAAF Area Combined Headquarters, South-Western area, Fremantle, Western Australia

== Former bases in Australia ==
=== Australian Capital Territory ===
- RAAF Base Fairbairn, Canberra – now Fairbairn Business Park and part of Canberra Airport. Decommissioned as an RAAF base in 2003 although No. 34 Squadron (VIP transport) is still based there.

=== New South Wales ===
- RAAF Base Albion Park, Albion Park
- RAAF Base Coffs Harbour, Coffs Harbour
- RAAF Base Evans Head, Evans Head
- RAAF Jervis Bay, Jervis Bay
- RAAF Base Moruya, Moruya
- RAAF Base Nabiac, Nabiac
- RAAF Base Rathmines, Rathmines – The largest flying boat base in Australia
- RAAF Base Temora, Temora
- RAAF Base Uranquinty, Uranquinty – 1941–45 Pilot training, and 1947–52 No.1 Basic Flying Training School for RAAF & RAN

=== Northern Territory ===
- RAAF Base Daly Waters, Daly Waters

=== Queensland ===
- RAAF Base Bowen, Bowen
- RAAF Base Cairns, Cairns

=== South Australia ===
- RAAF Base Mallala, Mallala

=== Victoria ===
- RAAF Base Mildura, Mildura
- RAAF Base West Sale, Sale
- RAAF Tottenham (Stores Depot), Maribyrnong
- RAAF Ballarat, Ballarat

== Stations in Australia ==
RAAF Stations were principally civil airfields with a permanent RAAF Station Headquarters and used for operational flying.

- RAAF Station Archerfield, Archerfield Airport, Brisbane, Queensland
- RAAF Station Bairnsdale, Bairnsdale, Victoria
- RAAF Station Bowen, Bowen, Queensland. Disbanded and reformed as RAAF Base Bowen.
- RAAF Station Bulga, Bulga, New South Wales
- RAAF Station Bundaberg, Bundaberg, Queensland
- RAAF Station Camden, Camden, New South Wales
- RAAF Station Cunderdin, Cunderdin, Western Australia
- RAAF Station Deniliquin, Deniliquin, New South Wales
- RAAF Station Evans Head, Evans Head, New South Wales
- RAAF Station Guildford, Guildford, Western Australia
- RAAF Station Mascot, Mascot, New South Wales
- RAAF Station Narrandera, Narrandera, New South Wales
- RAAF Station Narromine, Narromine, New South Wales
- RAAF Station Nowra, Nowra, New South Wales
- RAAF Station Pokolbin, Cessnock, New South Wales
- RAAF Station Sandgate, Brisbane, Queensland
- RAAF Station Schofields, Schofields, New South Wales
- RAAF Station Tocumwal, Tocumwal, New South Wales
- RAAF Station Wagga, Wagga Wagga, New South Wales
- RAAF Station West Sale, West Sale, Victoria

== Airfields in Australia ==
Civil or temporary airfields used by the RAAF and allied air forces during World War II for operational flying but which did not have a permanent RAAF Station Headquarters.

=== New South Wales ===
==== Sydney Basin ====
- Bankstown Aerodrome, Bankstown
- Bargo
- Bringelly Emergency Landing Ground, Bringelly
- Calwalla
- Camden see RAAF Station Camden
- Castlereagh Aerodrome, Castlereagh
- Fleurs Aerodrome, Kemps Creek
- Hoxton Park Landing Ground, Hoxton Park – Emergency and training field
- Marsden Park Aerodrome, Marsden Park
- Mascot see RAAF Station Mascot
- Menangle Aerodrome, Menangle Park – Satellite of Schofields
- Mittagong Aerodrome
- Moss Vale
- Mount Druitt Aerodrome, Mount Druitt
- Nepean Dam
- Pitt Town
- Ravenswood – Satellite of Fleur (not proceeded with)
- Richmond Aerodrome see RAAF Base Richmond
- Schofields Aerodrome see RAAF Station Schofields
- The Oaks Aerodrome, The Oaks – Satellite of Camden
- Wallgrove Aerodrome (Doonside), Doonside

==== Hunter & Central Coast ====
- Broke Aerodrome, Broke, satellite of RAAF Station Bulga
- Bulga Aerodrome, see RAAF Station Bulga
- Cessnock Aerodrome
- Dungog Aerodrome, Wallarobba, satellite of RAAF Base Williamtown
- Glendon Aerodrome
- Hexham Aerodrome
- Hotham Aerodrome
- Newcastle Aerodrome (Broadmeadow, District Park), Broadmeadow, Newcastle
- Pokolbin Aerodrome see RAAF Station Pokolbin
- Rathmines see RAAF Base Rathmines
- Rothbury Aerodrome, Rothbury, satellite of RAAF Station Pokolbin (not proceeded with)
- Ringwood Aerodrome, Eagleton
- Nandowra Aerodrome, Scone
- Strowan Aerodrome, Jerrys Plains, satellite of RAAF Station Bulga
- Tuggerah Aerodrome, Tuggerah, satellite of Fleurs Aerodrome
- Williamtown see RAAF Base Williamtown
- Warkworth Aerodrome, Warkworth, satellite of RAAF Station Bulga
- Weston Aerodrome, Weston, satellite of RAAF Station Pokolbin (not proceeded with)
- Woy Woy Aerodrome, Woy Woy, satellite of RAAF Station Schofields and HMS Nabthorpe

==== North Coast & New England ====
- Coffs Harbour Aerodrome, Coffs Harbour
- Clairville Aerodrome, Glen Innes
- Evans Head Aerodrome, see RAAF Station Evans Head
- Glen Innes Aerodrome, Glen Innes
- Guyra Aerodrome, Guyra
- Nabiac Aerodrome, see RAAF Base Nabiac
- Wellingrove Aerodrome, Wellingrove

==== Darling Plains ====
- Burroway
- Buckwoodlands
- Calala
- Dandaloo
- Dubbo
- Gidley
- Iowa
- Jones
- Minore
- Mogriguy
- Narromine, see RAAF Station Narromine
- Piggot
- Tamworth
- Timbrebongie
- Trangie
- Trescowthick
- Woodlands

==== Central West ====
- Blowclear
- Brolgan
- Copper Ridge
- Fish River Aerodrome, Fish River
- Goobang East
- Goulburn Landing Ground, Goulburn
- Lake Cargelligo
- Millthorpe
- Orange
- Parkes, see RAAF Station Parkes
- Raglan
- Spring Creek Reservoir
- Tichbourne

==== Murrumbidgee ====
- Belfrayden
- Bundidjarie
- Combaning
- Cootamundra
- Cudjello
- Forest Hill
- Gobbabaula
- Grong Grong Road
- Junee Road
- Kendalls
- Lake Albert
- Lake Coolah
- Narrandera, see RAAF Station Narrandera
- Pucawan
- Temora
- Tootool
- Uranquinty, see RAAF Base Uranquinty
- Wagga Road
- Wagga Wagga RAAF
- Yarragundry
- Young Road

==== Murray ====
- Allandale
- Albury
- Bradley Field
- Corowa
- Deniliquin, see RAAF Station Deniliquin
- Denison
- Dry Forest
- Hopefield
- Leetham Field
- Morocco
- Stud Park
- Tocumwal
- Wait O While
- Wandook
- Wangonilla
- Warbreccan

==== South Coast ====
- Albion Park Aerodrome, see RAAF Base Albion Park
- Cordeaux Aerodrome, Cordeux Dam
- Jervis Bay, see RAAF Base Jervis Bay
- Moruya Airfield (World War II installations), Moruya Airport
- Nowra, see RAAF Station Nowra
- Vineyards Aerodrome

==== Western Plains ====
- Broken Hill
- Cobar
- Lake Victoria
- North Bourke
- Roto
- Wentworth

=== Norfolk Island ===
- Norfolk Island Airfield, Norfolk Island

=== Northern Territory ===
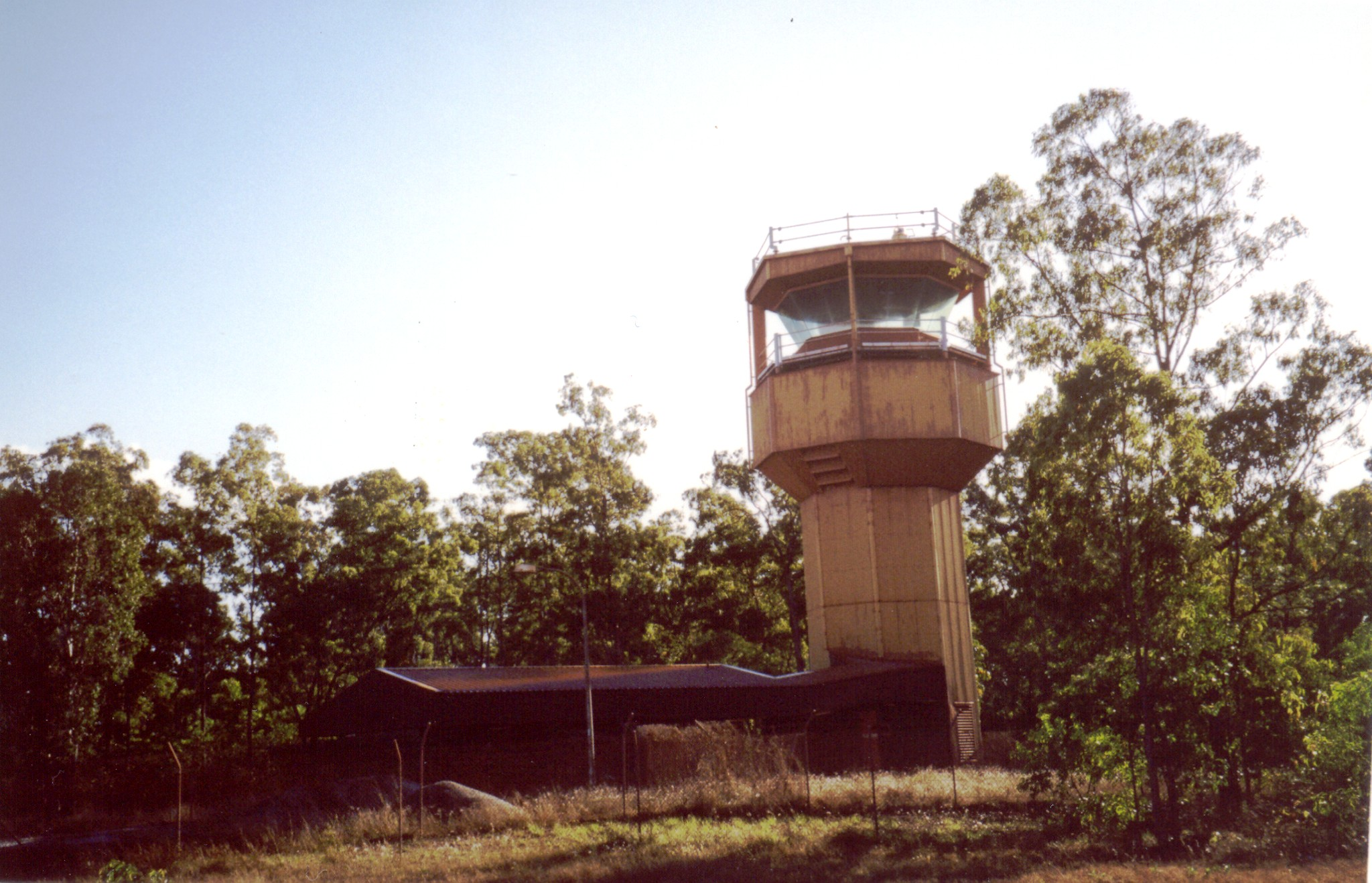
Decommissioned control tower at the former Airfield Gove.

- Adelaide River Emergency Landing Ground, near Adelaide River
- Alice Springs Airfield (7 Mile), Alice Springs
- Austin Strip (RAAF Melville Island), Milikapiti, Melville Island
- Batchelor Airfield, Batchelor
- Bathurst Island Airfield, Bathurst Island
- Berry Springs
- Birdum Airfield, Birdum
- Blyth No. 1 E.L.G
- Brunette Downs
- Coomalie Creek Airfield, Coomalie Creek
- Cape Fourcroy
- Carson's Field, Katherine
- Daly Waters Airfield, see RAAF Daly Waters
- Fenton Airfield, Hayes Creek
- Gorrie Airfield, Larrimah
- Gould Airfield, Batchelor
- Gove Airfield (Melville Bay Airfield), Gove Peninsula
- Groote Eylandt Airfield, Groote Eylandt
- Hughes Airfield (32 Mile), Noonamah
- Katherine Airfield, Katherine
- Koolpinyah H.S. E.L.G
- Livingstone Airfield (34 Mile), Livingstone
- Long Airfield, Hayes Creek
- Manbulloo Airfield, Manbulloo Station, Katherine
- MacDonald Airfield, north of Pine Creek
- Maranboy E.L.G
- Milingimbi Airfield, Milingimbi Island
- O'Connor's Field, Howard Island
- Oenpelli Emergency Landing Ground, Alligator River
- Parap Airfield (Darwin Aerodrome/Ross Smith Aerodrome), Parap
- Pell Airfield, SE of Batchelor, east of Stuart Highway
- Pine Creek Airfield, Pine Creek
- Port Keats Airfield, Port Keats
- Reynolds No. 4 Emergency Landing Ground, Reynolds
- Strauss Airfield (27 Mile Field, Humpty Doo Strip), Noonamah
- Tennant Creek Airfield, Tennant Creek
- Tipperary No. 9 Emergency Landing Ground
- Venn
- Willing
- Woolyanna No. 8B Emergency Landing Ground

=== Queensland ===
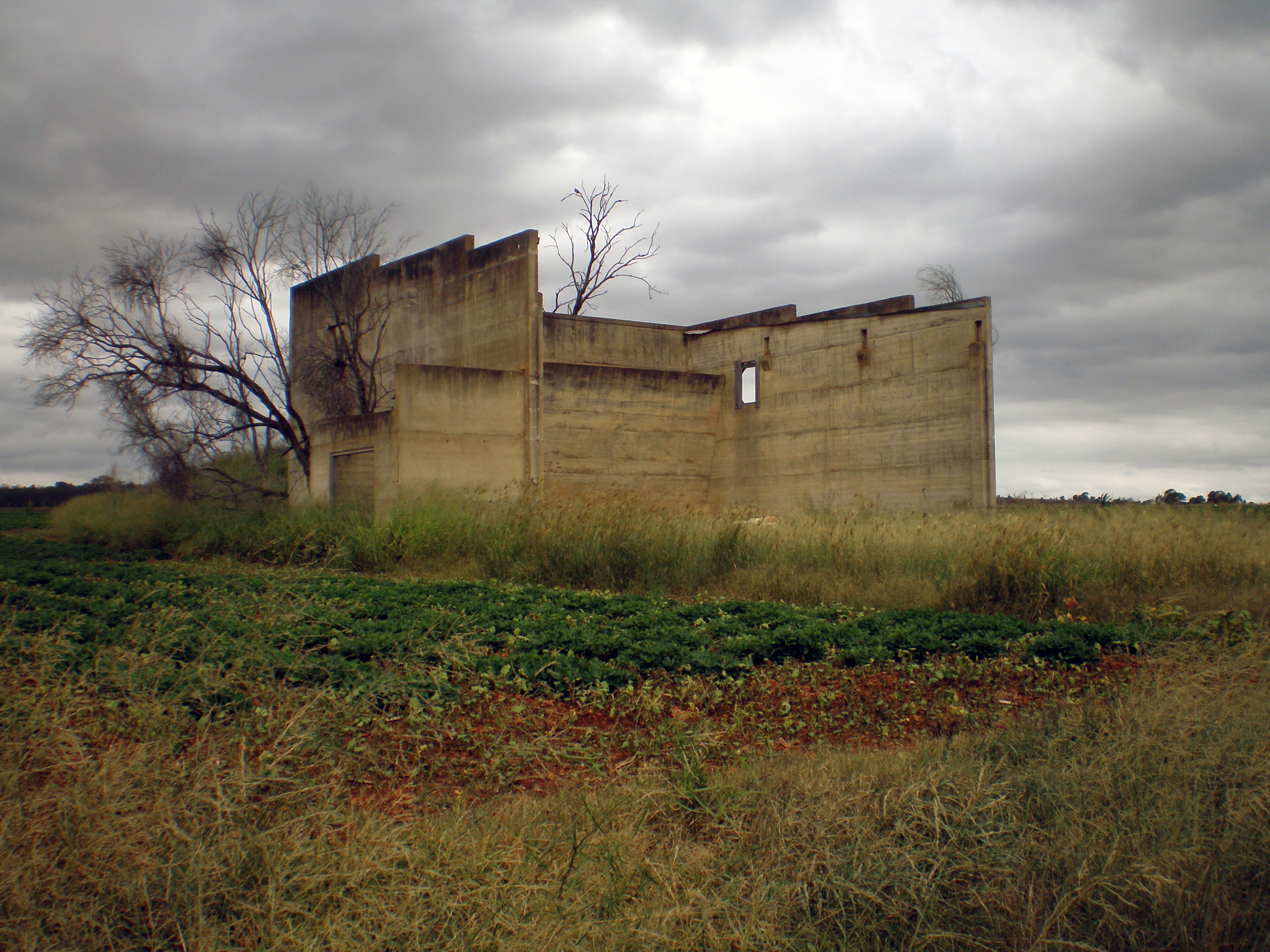
Aircraft firing butts, Kingaroy, Queensland, photographed 2008.

- Aitkenvale Aerodrome (Weir), Aitkenvale, Townsville
- Antil Plains Aerodrome, Antill Plains
- Amberley, see RAAF Base Amberley
- Archerfield, see RAAF Station Archerfield
- Augustus Downs
- Balfe's Creek
- Barcaldine
- Beenleigh
- Blackall
- Bohle River Aerodrome, Townsville
- Bowen, see RAAF Base Bowen
- Breddan Aerodrome, Breddan, Charters Towers
- Brunette Downs
- Brymaroo
- Bundaberg, see RAAF Station Bundaberg
- Cairns, see RAAF Base Cairns
- Camooweal
- Canobie Station
- Carpentaria Downs
- Cecil Plains
- Charleville Aerodrome, Charleville
- Charters Towers
- Cloncurry Aerodrome, Cloncurry
- Coen
- Condamine
- Cooktown Aerodrome (Cooktown Mission), Cooktown
- Coominya
- Cunnamulla
- Dunk Island
- Eagle Farm Airfield, Brisbane
- Elliot
- Fanning
- Gailes
- Garbutt, see RAAF Base Garbutt
- Giru
- Goolman
- Higgins Field (aka Jacky Jacky, Red Island Point, Red Point, or Bamaga; now Northern Peninsula Airport)
- Horn Island Aerodrome, Horn Island
- Inverleigh
- Jondaryan
- Kingaroy
- Kingston (Woodridge)
- Iron Range Aerodrome (Claudie & Gordon), Kutini-Payamu National Park
- Laura
- Leyburn Airfield, Leyburn
- Loganlea
- Longreach
- Lowood
- Mackay
- Macrossan
- Mareeba
- Maryborough
- Milgarra station
- Mount Hedlow
- Mitchell River Mission
- Mornington Island Airfield, Mornington Island
- Mount Isa
- Mount St John
- Mount Surprise
- Normanton
- Oakey
- Palm Island
- Petrie
- Powlathunga
- Reid River
- Rockhampton
- Ross River
- Runcorn (ELG)
- Southport Waterfield
- Strathglass
- Strathpine
- Stock Route
- Toogoolawah
- Toowoomba
- Torrens Creek
- Upper Ross River (Kelso Field)
- Waterford
- Winton
- Wivenhoe
- Wondoola Station
- Woodstock
- Wrotham Park

=== South Australia ===
- Ceduna Airfield, Ceduna
- Gawler Aerodrome, Gawler
- Kingscote Airfield, Kangaroo Island
- Mount Gambier Airfield, Mount Gambier
- Oodnadatta Airfield, Oodnadatta
- Parafield Airfield, Adelaide
- Port Lincoln Airfield, Port Lincoln
- Port Pirie Airfield, Port Pirie

=== Tasmania ===
- Auburn Landing Ground (not proceeded with)
- Cambridge Aerodrome, Hobart
- Currie Aerodrome, Currie, King Island
- Nile Relief Landing Ground, Nile
- Pats River Aerodrome, Flinders Island
- Quorn Hall Aerodrome, Campbell Town
- Tunbridge Aerodrome, Tunbridge
- Valleyfield Aerodrome, Valleyfield (near Epping Forest)
- Western Junction Aerodrome, Launceston

=== Victoria ===
- Ararat Aerodrome, Ararat
- Bacchus Marsh Aerodrome, Bacchus Marsh
- Bairnsdale, see RAAF Station Bairnsdale
- Ballarat, see RAAF Station Ballarat
- Benalla Aerodrome, Benalla
- Craigieburn Aerodrome, Craigieburn
- Cranbourne
- Cressy Aerodrome, Cressy
- Dutson
- East Stratford, not proceeded with
- Essendon Aerodrome, Essendon
- Exford, dispersal aerodrome for Laverton
- Fishermen's Bend Aerodrome, Fishermans Bend
- Flynn's Creek, not proceeded with
- Gifford
- Glengarry
- Greenhills
- Hamilton Airport
- Heath Hill
- Koo-wee-rup
- Lakeside
- Lara
- Little River
- Mallacoota Aerodrome, Mallacoota
- Mangalore West Aerodrome, Mangaloe
- Maryvale
- Mildura, see RAAF Base Mildura
- Monomeith Park Airfield, Monomeith
- Mordialloc, emergency landing aerodrome
- Murchison East Aerodrome, Murchison
- Nambrok
- Nhill Aerodrome, Nhill
- Oaklands
- Point Cook
- Swan Hill Aerodrome, Swan Hill
- Truganina, dispersal aerodrome for Laverton
- Warrnambool Aerodrome, Warrnambool
- Werribee Satellite Aerodrome, Werribee
- West Sale, see RAAF Base West Sale
- Wilsons Promontory Aerodrome, Wilsons Promontory
- Wooloomanata Aerodrome, Wooloomanata Station
- Yelta, relief landing ground for Mildura

=== Western Australia ===
- Agnew
- Ajana
- Albany Airfield, Albany
- Anna Plains
- Argyle Downs
- Bald Hill
- Bamboo Spring
- Beverley
- Big Bell
- Bindoon
- Bonnie Downs
- Boologooro
- Boorabbin
- Broome Airfield, Broome
- Bunbury Aerodrome, Bunbury
- Busselton Airfield, Busselton
- Callawa Station
- Campbell
- Cape Leveque
- Carlton Station
- Carnarvon Airfield, Carnarvon
- Coolawanyah
- Corunna Downs Airfield, Corunna Downs
- Christmas Creek
- Cue
- Cunderdin
- Darlot
- De Grey
- Derby
- Dowerin South
- Durey
- Drysdale Mission Airfield see Kalumburu
- Edjudina
- Esperance Airfield, Esperance
- Exmouth Gulf
- Exmouth Gulf No. 2
- Fitzroy Crossing
- Flora Valley
- Forrest
- Forrest River Mission, see Oombulgurri
- Georgina
- Geraldton
- Gingin North see RAAF Gingin
- Goomalling
- Gordon Downs
- Guildford, Western Australia, see RAAF Station Guildford
- Halls Creek
- Hamelin Pool, see Hamelin Pool Station
- Hillman
- Hillside
- Ivanhoe, see Kununurra
- Kalgoorlie
- Karungie Station
- Katanning
- Kimberley Downs
- Kojarena
- Kununoppin
- Lagrange, see Lagrange Bay
- Laverton
- Learmonth, see RAAF Learmonth and Exmouth
- Leonora see Leonora Airport
- Lissadell
- Liveringa Station
- Lyndon
- Maylands Airfield, Maylands
- Marble Bar
- Mardie
- Margaret River, Kimberley
- Marrillana
- Meckering
- Meekatharra
- Meka Station
- Merredin ELG
- Middle Swan (Caversham), Caversham
- Mileura
- Minchins Soak
- Minderoo
- Minilya North
- Moola Bulla
- Mooliabeenee
- Moora
- Monkey Mia see Shark Bay Airport
- Mount House see Mount House Station
- Mount Magnet
- Mount Sir Samuel see Sir Samuel
- Muchea East
- Muccan Station
- Mulga Downs see Mulga Downs Station
- Mulyie
- Munja
- Nannine
- Narrogin West
- Narrogin East
- Nicholson Station
- Nilli Bubbaca
- Nookanbah (Noonkanbah) Airfield, Noonkanbah Station
- Norseman
- North West Cape
- Onslow
- Pearce
- Perth
- Pinjarra North
- Port Hedland
- Reedy
- Rockwell
- Roebourne
- Rottnest Island
- Roy Hill
- Sandstone
- Southern Cross
- Sturt River
- Tableland Station
- Tenindewa
- Three Springs
- Thundelburra
- Turkey Creek
- Turner River
- Truscott Airfield, Anjo Peninsula
- Upper Swan
- Wagin
- Walkaway
- Warrawagine
- Weebo
- Whim Creek
- Wiluna
- Winning Pool
- Wittenoom
- Wollal
- Wooramel
- Wyndham
- Yalgoo
- Yampi Sound
- Yandal
- Yanrey
- Yinnietharra
- Yuin Station
- Yulleroo
- Zanthus

=== Flying boat stations in Australia ===
- Broome Flying Boat Base, Broome, Western Australia.
- Colmslie Flying Boat Base, Brisbane, Queensland. Shared with US Naval Air Station, Brisbane.
- Doctor's Gully Flying Boat Base, Darwin, Northern Territory.
- Hamilton Flying Boat Base, Brisbane, Queensland.
- Karumba Flying Boat Base, Karumba, Queensland.
- Lake Boga Flying Boat Base, Lake Boga, Victoria. Flying boat repair facility.
- Melville Bay Flying Boat Base, Melville Bay, Northern Territory.
- RAAF Marine Section Adelaide, Adelaide, South Australia.
- RAAF Marine Section Brisbane, Brisbane, Queensland.
- RAAF Marine Section Bowen, Bowen, Queensland.
- RAAF Marine Section Bundaberg, Bundaberg, Queensland.
- RAAF Marine Section Cairns, Cairns, Queensland.
- RAAF Marine Section Cockatoo Island, Cockatoo Island, Western Australia.
- RAAF Marine Section East Arm, Darwin, Northern Territory.
- RAAF Marine Section Evans Head, Evans Head, New South Wales.
- RAAF Marine Section Fremantle, Fremantle, Western Australia.
- RAAF Marine Section Geraldton, Geraldton, Western Australia.
- RAAF Marine Section Groote Island, Groote Eylandt, Northern Territory.
- RAAF Marine Section Jervis Bay, Jervis Bay.
- RAAF Marine Section Lake Boga, Lake Boga, Victoria.
- RAAF Marine Section Melbourne, Melbourne, Victoria.
- RAAF Marine Section Millingimbi, Milingimbi, Northern Territory.
- RAAF Marine Section Newcastle, Newcastle, New South Wales.
- RAAF Marine Section Paynesville, Paynesville, Victoria.
- RAAF Marine Section Perth, Perth, Western Australia.
- RAAF Marine Section Point Cook, Point Cook, Victoria.
- RAAF Marine Section Potshot, near Exmouth, Western Australia.
- RAAF Marine Section Thursday Island, Thursday Island, Queensland.
- RAAF Marine Section Townsville, Townsville, Queensland.
- Redland Bay Flying Boat Base, Redland Bay, near Brisbane, Queensland.
- Rathmines Flying Boat Base, Lake Macquarie, New South Wales, South of Newcastle.
- Rose Bay Flying Boat Base, Rose Bay, Sydney, New South Wales.
- St George's Basin Flying Boat Base, near Jervis Bay.

=== Bases overseas ===
Australian or allied bases at which RAAF units were permanently stationed.

- RAAF Area Combined Headquarters, North-Eastern area, Port Moresby, Papua New Guinea. Later moved to Townsville, Queensland.
- Butterworth Air Base, Butterworth, Penang, Malaysia (formerly RAAF Base Butterworth). Some RAAF units were based at Butterworth Air Base as part of the Five Power Defence Arrangements.
- RAAF Base Cocos Island, Cocos (Keeling) Islands, Indian Ocean.
- RAAF Base Tengah was collocated with RAF Tengah in the 1950s at what is now Tengah Airbase, Singapore. No 1 Squadron Lincoln Bombers were based there for most of the 1950s, and other units were also there at times.
- RAAF Base Port Moresby, Port Moresby, Papua New Guinea.
- RAAF Ubon, Ubon Ratchathani, Thailand.
- RAF Siu Sai Wan, Hong Kong.
- Al Minhad Air Base in the UAE, shared with the UAE military and other allies.

=== Airfields overseas ===
Civil, temporary or captured airfields used by the RAAF during World War II.

- Dili Airfield, Dili, Timor.
- Kila Kila Airfield, near Port Moresby, Papua New Guinea.
- Milne Bay Airbase Complex, Milne Bay, Papua New Guinea. Consisting of Turnbull Field, Gurney Field and Gurney Flying Boat Base.
- Mokmer Airfield, Biak Island, Dutch New Guinea.
- Sandakan Airfield, Sabah, British North Borneo.
- Tarakan Airfield, Tarakan, Kalimantan Timur, Indonesia.
- Wards Airfield, near Port Moresby, Papua New Guinea.

=== Flying boat stations overseas ===
Australian and allied flying boat bases used by the RAAF during World War II.

- Cape Chater Flying Boat Base, Cape Chater, Timor.
- Gorontalo Flying Boat Base, Gorontalo, Sulawesi, Indonesia.
- Gurney Flying Boat Base, Milne Bay, Papua New Guinea. Part of Milne Bay Airbase.
- Lingayen Gulf Flying Boat Base, Lingayen Gulf, Luzon, Philippines.
- Port Vila Flying Boat Base, Port Vila, New Hebrides.
- Port Moresby Flying Boat Base, Port Moresby, Papua New Guinea.
- Fakfak Flying Boat Base, Fakfak, Dutch New Guinea.
- Yampi Sound Flying Boat Base, Yampi Sound, Indian Ocean.

== See also ==
- List of Australian Army installations
