= Wedderburn Airport =

Wedderburn Airport Napper Field
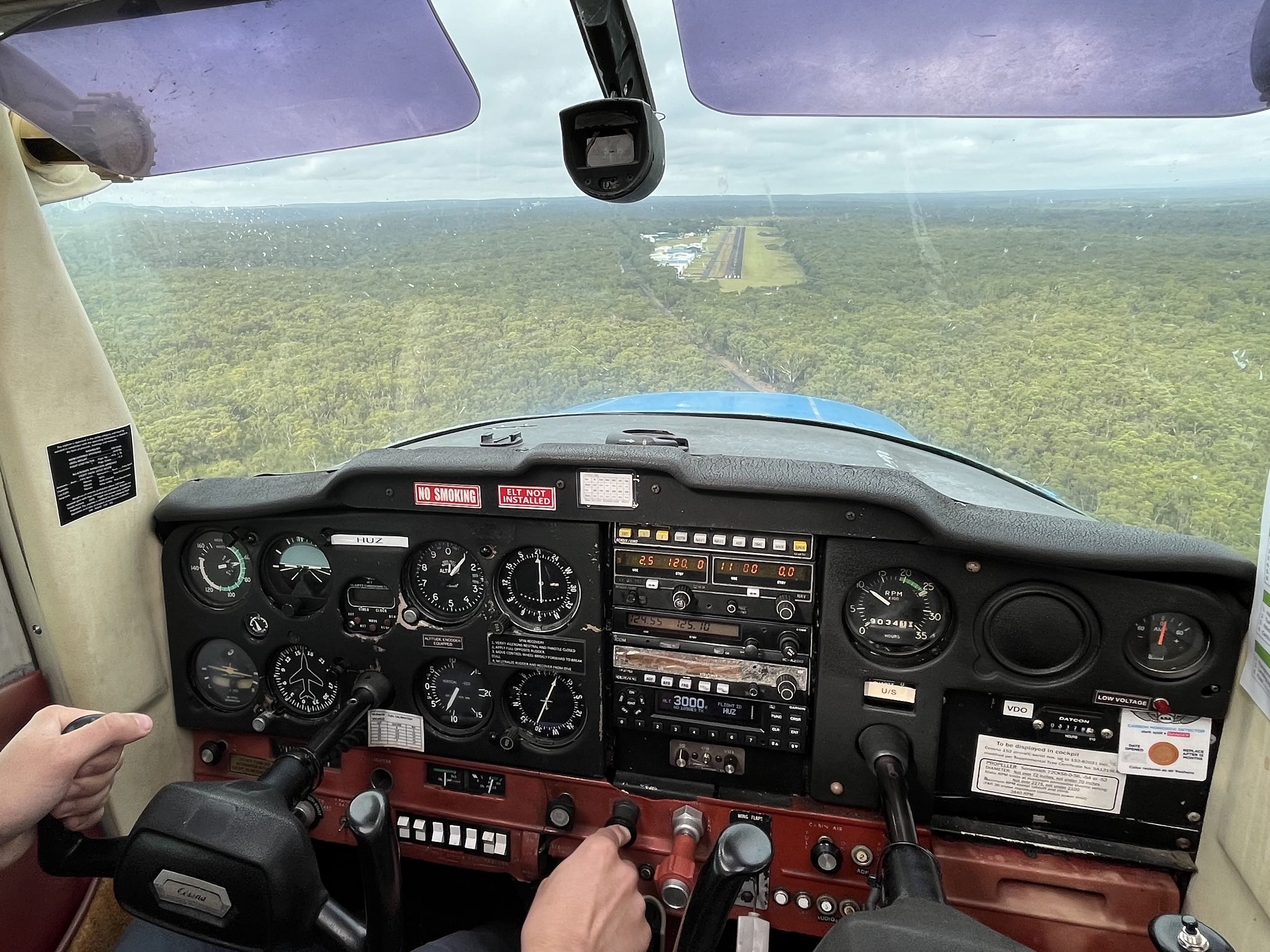
- C152 on approach to Wedderburn Airport
- IATA: none; ICAO: YWBN

Summary
- Airport type: Private
- Owner/Operator: NSW Sport Aircraft Club
- Serves: Campbelltown, New South Wales
- Location: Wedderburn, New South Wales
- Elevation AMSL: 850 ft / 259 m
- Coordinates: 34°10′48″S 150°48′30″E
- Website: https://www.nswsac.com.au/

Map
- Location in New South Wales

Runways
Direction	Length		Surface
Direction	m	ft	Surface
17/35	950	3,117	Asphalt
- Sources: AIP

Wedderburn Airport, also referred to as Napper Field (ICAO: YWBN), is a private airport located in Wedderburn, New South Wales, an outer rural suburb of Sydney, Australia. The airport caters to recreational aircraft owners and pilots, all of whom are members of the New South Wales Sport Aircraft Club.

== Overview ==
The airport was established to provide club members with a low-cost option for owning and operating their aircraft. The operating costs of the airport are paid through club membership fees and leasing of hangar space. The grounds are maintained by a caretaker who resides on site. It is reported that the annual operating cost under this model is approximately $65,000. The airport has become more popular with the recreational flyers following the closure of Hoxton Park Airport in 2008. Upgrades to airport facilities have been completed progressively as funds permit and include the sealing of the entire length of runway 17/35 in 2008 and ongoing works to seal the apron and taxiway areas.

In addition to regular flying club events, Wedderburn holds an annual open day and fly-in, an event that includes displays of a variety of home-built, ultralight, historic and military aircraft as well as a barbecue and family-friendly activities. The event is intended to be a social gathering for club members and an opportunity for interested members of the community to look around the facilities. In previous years, money raised has been donated to the organisations such as CareFlight.

== Facilities ==
Wedderburn Airport has a single runway, aligned 17/35, measuring approximately 950 m (3,120 ft) long. The strip has been progressively upgraded using funding from club members and was sealed to full length in 2008. There is currently no night lighting available, limiting the airport to daytime visual flight rules operation only. As Wedderburn caters to small recreational and general aviation category aircraft, the facilities are limited to use by aircraft not exceeding 4,000 kg (8,800 lb) maximum takeoff weight.

There is no control tower at the airport, so pilots are required to coordinate takeoffs and landings using a discrete Common Traffic Advisory Frequency. Weather information is available from nearby Camden Airport. Fuel (avgas) is available, and the site houses close to 100 hangars for the storage of members' aircraft.

== Accidents and incidents ==
- On 2 May 1992, a Jodel D11 aircraft, registration VH-CKY, suffered an engine failure shortly after becoming the airborne at Wedderburn. The pilot attempted a left turn back towards the runway, but had insufficient height or speed to control the aircraft, which crashed nose down into trees. The pilot was killed in the accident. He was the only person on board at the time.
- On 22 June 2003, a Cessna 172, registration VH-TUR, operating a private flight to Bankstown Airport in Sydney with four people on board, rolled to the right and crashed shortly after takeoff at Wedderburn. All those on board were killed. A subsequent investigation by the Australian Transport Safety Bureau found the aircraft entered an aerodynamic stall from which the pilot was unable to recover. Contributing factors were the wind conditions at the time and the fact that the aircraft was overweight and out of balance.

== See also ==
- List of airports in Greater Sydney
- List of airports in New South Wales
