= Acacia donaldsonii =

Scientific classification
- Kingdom: Plantae
- Clade: Tracheophytes
- Clade: Angiosperms
- Clade: Eudicots
- Clade: Rosids
- Order: Fabales
- Family: Fabaceae
- Subfamily: Caesalpinioideae
- Clade: Mimosoid clade
- Genus: Acacia
- Species: A. donaldsonii

Binomial name
- Acacia donaldsonii R.S.Cowan & Maslin
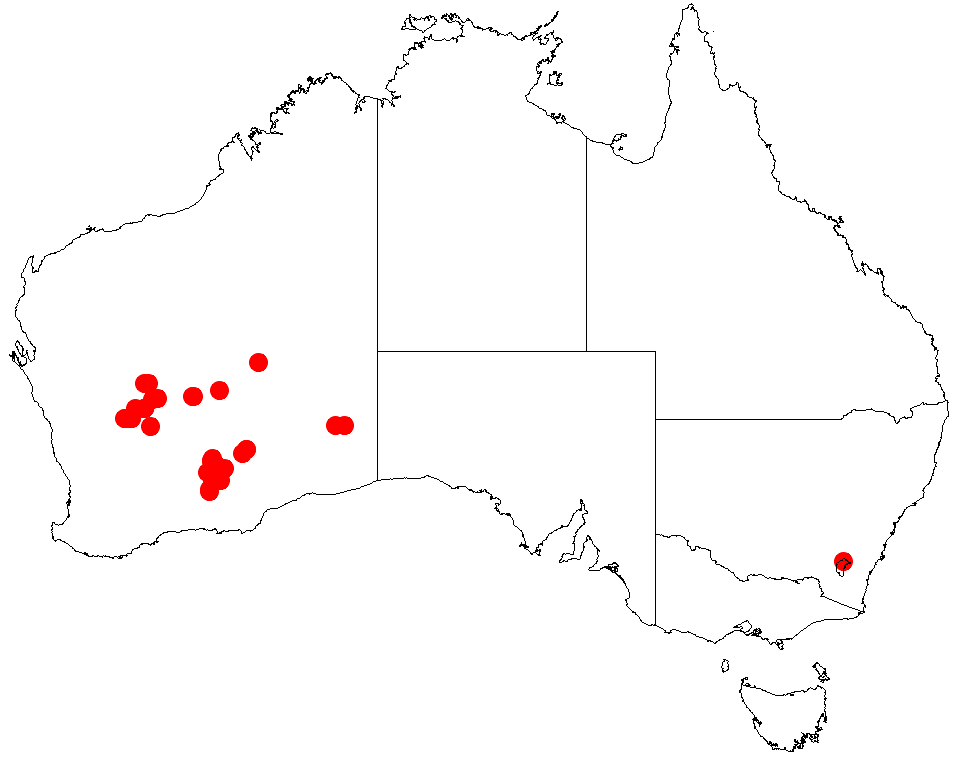
- Occurrence data from AVH

Synonyms
- Racosperma donaldsonii (R.S.Cowan & Maslin) Pedley

Species of legume

Acacia donaldsonii, commonly known as Binneringie wattle, is a species of flowering plant in the family Fabaceae and is endemic to the inland areas of Western Australia. It is a shrub or gnarled tree with hairy, resinous branchlets, ascending to erect, terete phyllodes, spherical heads of golden yellow flowers and leathery, linear pods resembling a string of beads.

== Description ==
Acacia donaldsonii is a shrub or gnarled tree that typically grows to a height of 1.5–5 m (5–16 ft) and has terete, hairy branchlets that are scarred by raised stem-projections where phyllodes have fallen. Its phyllodes are ascending to erect, terete, 60–145 mm (2.4–5.7 in) long and 1.5–2.5 mm (0.059–0.098 in) in diameter with an awl-shaped or sharply pointed end. The flowers are borne in two or more spherical heads in axils on peduncles 5–15 mm (0.20–0.59 in) long, each head 4–5 mm (0.16–0.20 in) in diameter with 30 to 56 golden yellow flowers. The pods are leathery, resemble a string of beads, or linear, up to 140 mm (5.5 in) long and 6–10 mm (0.24–0.39 in) wide, curved and twisted after the seeds are lost. The seeds are elliptic to oblong, 6.5–9 mm (0.26–0.35 in) long, dull brown, with a club-shaped to hemispherical aril.

== Taxonomy ==
Acacia donaldsonii was first formally described in 1999 by the botanists Richard Sumner Cowan and Bruce Maslin in the journal Nuytsia from specimens collected on Weebo Station in 1988. The specific epithet (donaldsonii) honours Michael Donaldson, "a mining engineer working near Kalgoorlie, Western Australia", who brought this species to the attention of Cowan and Maslin in early 1988.

== Distribution and habitat ==
Binneringie wattle occurs on pastoral stations from Lake Yindarlgooda and south to Norseman and near Carlisle Lakes in the Coolgardie, Great Victoria Desert, Murchison and Nullarbor bioregions of southern Western Australia, where it grows in sandy, clayey and gravelly loam on sandplains, salty, stony plains and near salt lakes with species of Atriplex and Maireana.

== Conservation status ==
Acacia donaldsonii is listed as "not threatened" by the Government of Western Australia Department of Biodiversity, Conservation and Attractions.

== See also ==
- List of Acacia species
