= DYW =

DYW may refer to:

- Daly Waters Airport (IATA code: DYW), Daly Waters, Northern Territory, Australia
- Distinguished Young Women, an American national non-profit organization that provides scholarship opportunities to high school senior girls

== See also ==
- KeDyw, a Polish World War II Home Army unit
