= RAAF Gingin =

Military airfield in Western Australia

- Gingin, Western Australia in Australia

Site information
- Type: Military airfield; unmanned
- Owner: Department of Defence
- Operator: Royal Australian Air Force

Location
- Location in Western Australia
- Coordinates: 31°27′54″S 115°51′48″E
- Area: 700 hectares (1,700 acres)

Site history
- In use: 1960s – present

Airfield information
- Identifiers: ICAO: YGIG
- Elevation: 75 metres (247 ft) AMSL
Runways
Direction	Length and surface
08/26	1,828 metres (5,997 ft) Asphalt
- Sources: Australian AIP and aerodrome chart

RAAF Gingin (ICAO: YGIG), sometimes also RAAF Base Gingin or RAAF Base Gin Gin, is a Royal Australian Air Force (RAAF) small military airfield located at Gingin, in Western Australia.

== History ==
Constructed during the 1960s, the airfield is set on 700 hectares (1,700 acres); predominantly used for pilot training and various other uses that include the bulk storage and distribution of fuel, with both above-ground and underground storage tanks. The airfield is located 55 kilometres (34 mi) north of Perth and 34 km (21 mi) by road north of RAAF Base Pearce, which also administers the site. There are no RAAF personnel based at Gingin.

In 2016 it was reported that the Australian Government had approved funding for the upgrade of the air traffic control tower at RAAF Gingin.

The airfield is used by the Pearce Aero Club, which keeps some aircraft there.

The airfield has previously been identified as the site for a possible second airport for Perth.

== See also ==
- List of airports in Western Australia
- List of Royal Australian Air Force installations
