= List of airports in Greater Sydney =

This is a list of current and previous airports in the Greater Sydney area of New South Wales.

== List of airports ==
Community	Airport name	Type	ICAO	IATA	Coordinates
Mascot	Sydney Airport (Primary Airport, International and Domestic Operations)	Public	YSSY	SYD	33°56′46″S 151°10′38″E
Badgerys Creek	Western Sydney Airport (Secondary Airport, International, and Domestic Operations)	Public	YSWS	WSI	33°52′46″S 150°44′23″E
Bankstown	Bankstown Airport (General Aviation and Freight)	Public	YSBK	BWU	33°55′30″S 150°59′18″E
Camden	Camden Airport (General Aviation)	Public	YSCN	CDU	34°02′24″S 150°41′12″E
Palm Beach	Palm Beach Water Airport	Public		LBH	33°35′15″S 151°19′26″E
Rose Bay	Rose Bay Water Airport	Public		RSE	33°52′14″S 151°15′19″E
Richmond	RAAF Base Richmond (Military Operations)	Military	YSRI	XRH	33°36′11″S 150°47′02″E
The Oaks	The Oaks Airfield (Recreational & Ultra-light)	Private	YOAS		34°04′58″S 150°33′36″E
Wedderburn	Wedderburn Airport	Private	YWBN		34°10′48″S 150°48′30″E

== Inactive/historic/former airports ==
Community	Airport name	Type	ICAO	IATA	Coordinates Inactive airports
Castlereagh	Castlereagh Aerodrome	Military			33°40′37″S 150°41′15″E
Hoxton Park	Hoxton Park Airport	Public			33°54′35″S 150°51′08″E
Penrith	Fleurs Aerodrome	Military			33°51′48″S 150°46′30″E
Schofields	RAAF Station Schofields	Military			33°42′49″S 150°52′16″E

== See also ==
- List of airports in New South Wales
