= RAAF Station Bulga =

- IATA: none; ICAO: none

Summary
- Airport type: RAAF Station
- Location: Bulga, New South Wales, Australia
- Built: 1942
- Occupants: Royal Australian Air Force

RAAF Station Bulga was an aerodrome constructed in 1942 by the Royal Australian Air Force north of Bulga, New South Wales, Australia during World War II.

The aerodrome consisted of four runways. Two were sealed and 2,200 feet (670 m) and 1,800 feet (550 m) long x 300 feet (91 m) wide and another two were grass 1,500 feet (460 m) long x 300 feet (91 m) wide.

The aerodrome was served by the satellite fields of Warkworth, Broke and Strowan.
