= Daly Waters Airfield =

- RAAF Base Daly Waters
- Daly Waters, Northern Territory in Australia

Site information
- Type: Military airfield; Defunct commercial airfield
- Owner: Department of Defence
- Operator: Commercial aviation (1926 – 1942); Royal Australian Air Force (1942 – 1943); Commercial aviation (1943 – 1970); Royal Australian Air Force (1970 – present)

Location
- Location in the Northern Territory
- Coordinates: 16°15′42″S 133°22′50″E

Site history
- In use: 1942 – 1945 (military use); 1970 – present (military use)
- Battles/wars: Pacific War, World War II

Garrison information
- Garrison: United States Army Air Forces (1942)

Daly Waters Airfield RAAF Base Daly Waters
- IATA: none; ICAO: YDLW

Summary
- Airport type: Military airfield; Defunct civil airport
- Owner: Department of Defence
- Operator: Royal Australian Air Force
- Elevation AMSL: 700 ft (210 m)
- Coordinates: 16°15′42″S 133°22′50″E

Map
- Location in the Northern Territory

Runways
Direction	Length		Surface
Direction	m	ft	Surface
13/31	2,138	7,014	Asphalt
- Sources: Australian AIP and aerodrome chart

The Daly Waters Airfield, also RAAF Base Daly Waters, is a former commercial and sporadically-used military airfield located at Daly Waters, Northern Territory, Australia. As an airfield on Australia's earliest international routes, Daly Waters was used throughout the 1920s and 1930s as a stop over for commercial airlines operating on the domestic route to Western Australia and international carriers flying from Australia into south-east Asia via Darwin. During World War II, the airbase was used by the Royal Australian Air Force (RAAF) and the United States Army Air Force to undertake combat operations against the Japanese in New Guinea, the Dutch East Indies and the islands to Australia's north. Following the war, the airbase was used commercially again up until the 1970s when the airfield was sporadically-used by the RAAF.

== History ==
Daly Waters was a refuelling stop for early pioneering flights through Darwin and QANTAS flights to Singapore (also via Darwin). During the 1930s, the growth of international air travel meant the airport became a busy refuelling point, despite its isolation and rudimentary facilities. The airfield was served by QANTAS, Australian National Airways and Guinea Airways as well as being an important connection point for MacRobertson Miller Airlines flights to Western Australia.

=== World War II ===
In the early months of 1942, following the outbreak of hostilities in the Pacific against the Japanese, the airfield was used a waypoint on the "Brereton Route" for operations between Australia and Java. It was a staging base for aircraft from Cloncurry, Queensland and then up to Darwin area airfields. The RAAF requisitioned the airfield and on 15 March 1942 it became RAAF Base Daly Waters; and operations commenced on 15 May 1942.

The 64th Bomb Squadron of the United States Army Air Forces' Fifth Air Force 43rd Bombardment Group were based at Daly Waters from 16 May 1942 until 2 August 1942, flying B-17 Flying Fortresses from the airfield. The squadron made numerous attacks on Japanese shipping in the Dutch East Indies and the Bismarck Archipelago. Other operations during this period included support for ground forces on New Guinea; attacks on airfields and installations in New Guinea, the Bismarck Archipelago, Celebes, Halmahera, Yap, Palau, and the southern Philippines; and long-range raids against oil refineries on Ceram and Borneo.

=== Post-war use ===
In late 1943, the RAAF base was wound down as the war proceeded north, and the airfield was returned to civil use. Commercial traffic continued at the airfield until 1970. Ansett Australia and TAA operated one flight a week with TAA flying south in the morning and Ansett flying north in the evening. The last TAA flight took place on 1 April 1970 with Ansett concluding its operations a week or so later. The original Qantas hangar still stands, housing exhibits of photographs and equipment from the area's aviation past. The main runway, although deteriorated, appears to still be serviceable. The airfield is used by the RAAF for joint military manoeuvres.

== Units based at Daly Waters airfield ==
Unit	Aircraft	Assigned	Reassigned	Time at Daly Waters	Notes
No. 2 Squadron RAAF	Hudsons				
No. 12 Squadron RAAF	Wirraways				
No. 13 Squadron RAAF	Hudson				
No. 34 Squadron RAAF	Dragon & Ansons				
No. 1 Repair and Salvage Unit RAAF					
Fifth Air Force, United States Army Air Forces
64th Bombardment Squadron 43d Bombardment Group	B-17 Flying Fortress	16 May 1942	2 August 1942	78 days	Dispersed from Group HQ at Sydney, New South Wales

== See also ==
- United States Army Air Forces in Australia (World War II)
- List of airports in the Northern Territory
- List of Royal Australian Air Force installations
