= Broke Aerodrome =

Aerodrome in New South Wales, Australia

Coordinates: 32°44′54″S 151°06′04″E

- IATA: none; ICAO: none

Summary
- Airport type: Satellite aerodrome (dispersal)
- Location: Broke, New South Wales, Australia
- Built: 1942
- Occupants: Royal Australian Air Force
- Interactive map of Broke Aerodrome

Broke Aerodrome was an aerodrome constructed in 1942 by the Royal Australian Air Force as a satellite aerodrome north of Broke, New South Wales, Australia, during World War II.

The runway ran south west to north east and was 5,000 feet (1,500 m) long x 150 feet (46 m) wide. The aerodrome was as a dispersal satellite field for RAAF Station Bulga near Singleton.
