= The Oaks Airfield =

The Oaks Airfield The Oaks Community Airport
- IATA: none; ICAO: YOAS

Summary
- Airport type: Private
- Owner: Graeme Onus
- Serves: The Oaks, New South Wales, Greater Sydney
- Location: The Oaks, New South Wales
- Elevation AMSL: 880 ft / 268 m
- Coordinates: 34°05′02″S 150°33′36″E
- Website: www.theoaksairport.com.au

Map
- Location in New South Wales

Runways
Direction	Length		Surface
Direction	m	ft	Surface
18/36	850	2,789	Grass
09/27	400	1,312	Grass

Statistics (2011)
- Daily aircraft movements: 200

The Oaks Airfield is an unlicensed private airfield located in The Oaks, New South Wales, in the Wollondilly Shire, west of Sydney, Australia. Originally built by the Royal Australian Air Force (RAAF) during World War II, today the airfield caters mostly to recreational aircraft and flight training and is home to Dave's Flying School and the Sydney Recreational Flying Club. The airfield is a heritage listed site and is the only airport constructed during WWII to still be operational. Other airfields from the time in Sydney have either being converted or demolished.

== History ==
The Oaks airfield was constructed in 1942 as a satellite field of Camden Airport, at the time a major operational base and RAAF station. The Oaks was built with a sealed 5,000 ft (1,500 m) runway and could function as a dispersal base to hide aircraft should the major bases in Sydney come under attack. The construction of Burragorang Road between the late 1940s and 1960 as the main access to Warragamba Dam cut across the original runway, and only the southern end of the site is still used for aviation purposes.

The current owner purchased the airfield in 1975. In late 1981, the owner acquired a Hawker-Siddeley HS.125 training jet from Qantas and transported it to the field. The derelict jet has since become a popular attraction with aviation enthusiasts and photographers. In 1985, the Sydney Ultralight Flying Club (now Sydney Recreational Flying Club Inc.) was formed and began using The Oaks as a base for operations.

On 21 September 2009, the Wollondilly Shire Council approved the construction of a 35 m (115 ft) telecommunications tower in McIntosh Street, The Oaks, within the circuit area for the airfield, at a distance of approximately 150 m (490 ft) from the runway edge. A judgement by the Supreme Court of New South Wales handed down on 10 February 2011 restricted the height of any tower on the approved site to be limited to a maximum height of 18 m (59 ft) thus reducing the impact on airport operations and the risk of a collision.

== Facilities and operations ==
The airport has three grass runways, 2 parallel 850 m × 45 m (2,789 ft × 148 ft) strips aligned north–south and a much shorter east–west strip just 400 m (1,312 ft) used only for emergencies. As the airport is not a licensed aerodrome and does not have a control tower, simultaneous operations on parallel runways are not permitted, so only one of these strips is in use at any one time, adopting the designation 18/36. The unused strip is allowed to lie fallow to maintain the runway surface. The airfield is generally restricted to aircraft with a Maximum Takeoff Weight under 5,700 kg (12,600 lb). There is no runway lighting so operations are limited to daylight hours. Pilots use non-controlled-aerodromes procedures to coordinate arrivals and departures. The nearby, Oaks Township is an important landmark for visual flight rules pilots when approaching Camden Airport, placing this Aircraft Landing Area their approach-path.

The primary user of The Oaks is Dave's Flying School, a Recreational Aviation Australia accredited flying school, which offers students an alternative to the congested Bankstown and Camden airports for initial flight training in the Sydney area. The Sydney Recreational Flying Club also uses the airfield, mainly on weekends. The Southern Cross Gliding Club regularly use The Oaks as an alternative field for training and emergency purposes. Approximately 80% of the movements at the airport (on average 200 per day) are conducted as flight training. The airfield is also used for balloon and parachute operations, as well as supporting aircraft operations by the New South Wales Police Force, NSW National Parks & Wildlife Service and Australian Defence Force. The Oaks is an emergency alternative to Camden and Bankstown for general aviation traffic and prior permission is required (PPR) to land. See ERSA – YOAS for details.

== Future ==
The owner of the airfield has expressed a desire to restore the World War II site and incorporate an aviation and transport museum. As of 2009, the owner and management were working with the Civil Aviation Safety Authority to upgrade The Oaks airfield as a registered airport to increase the scope of operations. Infrastructure Australia conducted analysis on a potential site close in the immediate vicinity of The Oaks Airfield for a second Sydney airport, however it was not selected as a suitable site. As of 2023, the airport remains in the same state as it was in 2009, with its owner continuing to plan for its future development.

== See also ==
- List of airports in Greater Sydney
- List of airports in New South Wales
