= Fleurs Aerodrome =

Coordinates: 33°51′47″S 150°46′27″E

External images
- Wartime images – MSgt Alexander Sandor Balogh Jr.
- 41st Fighter Squadron, 35th Fighter Group, USAAC. A Flight Strip, Kemp's Creek, July 1942.
- 41st Fighter Squadron, 35th Fighter Group, USAAC. A Flight Strip, Kemp's Creek, July 1942.

Fleurs Aerodrome was a parent aerodrome built on behalf of the Royal Australian Air Force during World War II. It is located at Kemps Creek 40 km west of Sydney, Australia

Construction started on the aerodrome in 1942 and was still under construction in 1944 as part of a proposal to base a United States Navy Fleet Air Wing in Sydney should the need arise. Initially planned with three runways, No.1 (5000 ft) and No. 3 (6000 ft) runways were serviceable, however construction of No. 2 runway (5000 ft) was abandoned. A total of eight aircraft dispersal hideouts were constructed and accommodation was a farm house and a former Civil Constructional Corps camp.

In 1946 the AWA Club, taking advantage of the fact that Fleurs was disused, began gliding operations at Fleurs. Other gliding groups joined in. Gliding continued at Fleurs until 1953, when the gliding clubs moved to Camden Airport.

In 1969, Fleurs was considered as a site of a second airport for Sydney to operate scheduled passenger flights, which were only done by one other airport in the city, Kingsford Smith. The aerodrome is now utilised as precision ground-reflection antenna range operated by the University of Sydney, known as the Fleurs Radio Observatory.

== Satellite aerodromes ==
- Wallgrove Aerodrome
- Bringelly Aerodrome
- Ravenswood Aerodrome (planned but not constructed)
- Mittagong Aerodrome
- Bargo Aerodrome
- Tuggerah Aerodrome

== See also ==
- List of airports in Greater Sydney
- List of airports in New South Wales
