= Marsden Park Aerodrome =

Australian Air Force base

Coordinates: 33°40′S 150°47′E

Marsden Park Aerodrome was an aerodrome constructed by the Royal Australian Air Force (RAAF) in Berkshire Park, near Marsden Park, New South Wales during World War II.

The aerodrome was built in 1942, as a relief landing ground for RAAF Base Richmond, with a runway 5,000 feet (1,500 m) long and 150 feet (46 m) wide. A number of RAAF radar stations; No's 169, 170, 309 & 312 were located around the aerodrome during separate times.

The aerodrome was abandoned after World War II and was briefly used as a motorsport facility in the 1940s. The first event held was on 10 June 1946, and was known as the Victory Day Races. It was promoted by the New South Wales Sporting Car Club and consisted of short sprint races, some just two laps of the circuit which ran up and down the runway with a turn at each end. A second and final meeting was held over the Australia Day long weekend of 1947. The feature race was an 18-lap handicap and was initially won by W.S. Ward in an MG TB, however Ward was disqualified for being too much faster than in practice (when handicaps were determined) so second placed RH Mitchell in an Austin Special was declared the winner.
