= RAAF Base Nabiac =

RAAF Base Nabiac Nabiac Aerodrome
- IATA: none; ICAO: none

Summary
- Airport type: Military
- Location: Nabiac, New South Wales, Australia
- Coordinates: 32°07′54″S 152°26′03″E

Map
- Location in New South Wales

RAAF Base Nabiac was an advanced operating base for the Royal Australian Air Force (RAAF), during the Second World War, near Nabiac, New South Wales, Australia. Constructed in 1942 by the NSW Public Works Department 10 km (6.2 mi) to the south east of Nabiac. The aerodrome consisted of four runways, with associated bomb dumps and camouflaged hangars for the Avro Anson and Douglas Boston aircraft stationed at the aerodrome. The base was closed after the war and fell into disuse. New England Airways later commenced a passenger and freight service and later Butler Air Transport then took over operations until 1952, when Wallis Island Aerodrome at Forster was opened.

The Central North Coast Sporting Car Club, Taree now use the site and they hold regular motor sport events on the gravel runways.

== See also ==
- List of airports in New South Wales
