= Bowen Airport =

- IATA: ZBO; ICAO: YBWN

Summary
- Airport type: Public
- Operator: Whitsunday Regional Council
- Location: Bowen, Queensland
- Elevation AMSL: 26 ft / 8 m
- Coordinates: 20°01′04″S 148°12′55″E

Map
- Location in Queensland

Runways
Direction	Length		Surface
Direction	m	ft	Surface
04/22	1,308	4,291	Asphalt
02/30	901	2,956	Asphalt
- Sources: Australian AIP and aerodrome chart

Bowen Airport (IATA: ZBO, ICAO: YBWN) is located at Bowen, Queensland, Australia.

== See also ==
- List of airports in Queensland
