= Castlereagh Aerodrome =

Airport in New South Wales, Australia

- IATA: none; ICAO: none

Summary
- Location: Castlereagh, New South Wales
- Coordinates: 33°40′37″S 150°41′15″E

Map
- Location of airport in New South Wales

Runways
Direction	Length		Surface
Direction	ft	m	Surface
	5,000	1,500	Bitumen

Castlereagh Aerodrome was a Royal Australian Air Force (RAAF) emergency landing ground and dispersal ground during World War II at Castlereagh, New South Wales, Australia. The runway was 5,000 ft (1,500 m) long × 150 ft (46 m) wide. The airfield was to become home to No. 94 Squadron's Mosquito aircraft and had been upgraded by No. 9 Airfield Construction Squadron, however the aircraft did not arrive before No. 94 Squadron was relocated to RAAF Base Richmond and disbanded.

After disposal by the RAAF, the airfield was used as a drag strip from the early 1960s, eventually closing in April 1984, becoming Castlereagh Country Estate.

== See also ==
- List of airports in Greater Sydney
- List of airports in New South Wales
