= Wallgrove Aerodrome =

Coordinates: 33°47′07″S 150°52′17″E

Wallgrove Aerodrome was a Royal Australian Air Force satellite and emergency airfield at Doonside, New South Wales, Australia during World War II.

The aerodrome was built in 1942 and the runway was 5000 ft (1524m) long and 150 ft (45.72m) wide running NW-SW. After World War II the aerodrome was closed in 1946 and reverted to farmland.

A number of former revetments are still in existence and the runway can still be located. An industrial area has been built over the southern end of the aerodrome.

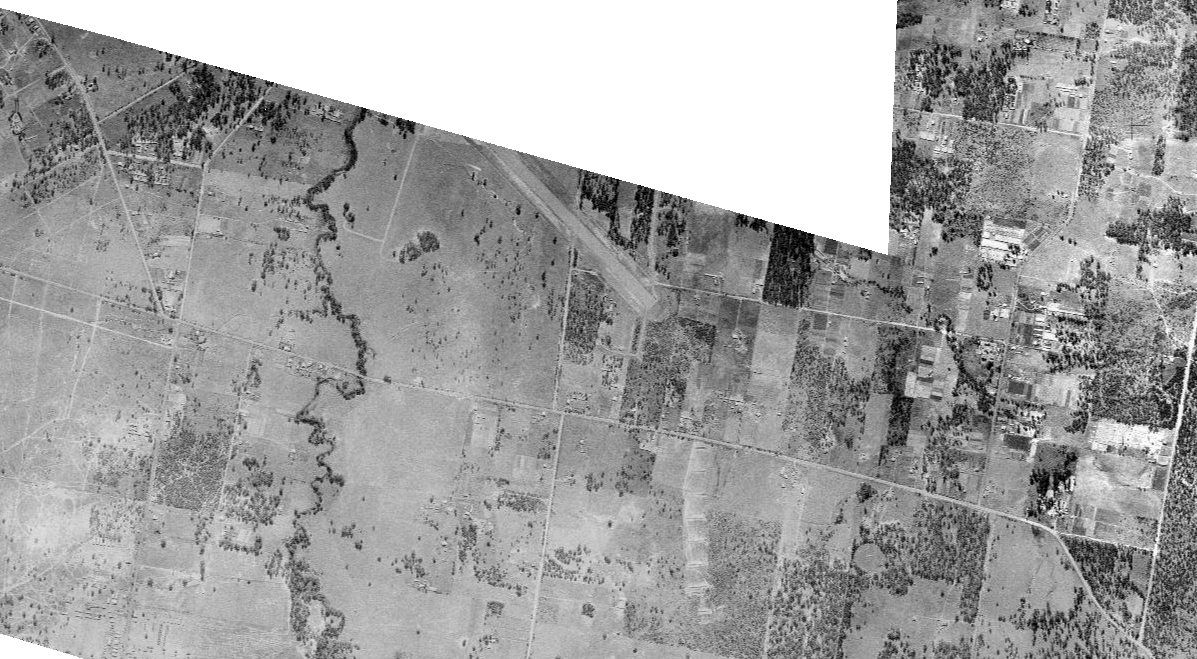
A 1943 air photo of portion of the wartime Wallgrove airstrip

== Parent Aerodrome ==
- Fleurs Aerodrome
