= Broadmeadow Aerodrome =

- IATA: none; ICAO: none

Summary
- Location: Broadmeadow, New South Wales
- Opened: 1929
- Closed: 1963

Broadmeadow Aerodrome was an aerodrome located at District Park, Broadmeadow, Australia, operating from 1929 to 1963.

The Newcastle Aero Club (NAC) selected a site after careful consideration and began preparations and cleared the land at District Park in 1928, to create a grassed runway. The first aircraft to land at the aerodrome was an Avro 504K, registered as VH-UBC, on 4 September 1929, which had Newcastle's Own painted on one side of the tail rudder and Spirit of Newcastle painted on the other side.

The first Tiger Moth in Australia delivered on 2 June 1935, registered as VH-UTD and named Halycon, was kept at the aerodrome by the NAC.

Early pioneering aviators Charles Kingsford Smith, Jean Batten and Bert Hinkler visited the aerodrome during their flights up and down the east coast of Australia.

During World War II, the Royal Australian Air Force (RAAF) utilised the aerodrome as a satellite aerodrome to RAAF Base Williamtown. The NAC workshops over-hauled RAAF trainers and manufactured wooden wing-tips for the Mosquito fighter bomber. The aerodrome was also utilised by PBY Catalina, Supermarine Walrus and Dakotas.

After the war ended the NAC purchased a Bellman Hangar from the RAAF and erected it on-site next to its main hangar. In 1953, the Newcastle Aero Club became the Royal Newcastle Aero Club, with permission granted by Queen Elizabeth II. During the 1950s the club was given notice by the Department of Civil Aviation to relocate from the field at Broadmeadow because the area had become built-up and high television antennae on the perimeter of the field interfered with landing approaches. In 1963, the club transferred its operations from Broadmeadow to its present airport at Rutherford, Maitland.

== Crashes at Broadmeadow Aerodrome ==
- De Havilland 87B Hornet Moth biplane, Registration #VH-UYX, undercarriage damaged on landing.
- United States Army Air Forces DC-3/C-47
- RAAF CAC Boomerang, Serial #A46-17 (No. 2 Operational Training Unit RAAF), crashed during take-off – 28 May 1944.
- RAAF CAC Wirraway
- RAAF Boston
- RAAF Kittyhawk
- RAAF Bristol Beaufort, Serial #A9-281 (No. 32 Squadron RAAF), crashed across Lambton Road, Broadmeadow during emergency landing - 11 October 1943 - converted to components.
- RNAC Cessna 172, crashed on take-off, ending up in storm water drain – about 1960
