= No. 34 Squadron RAAF =

Royal Australian Air Force VIP transport squadron

- No. 34 Squadron's crest
- Active: 1942–1946; 1948–1955; 1959–current
- Allegiance: Australia
- Branch: Royal Australian Air Force
- Role: VIP transport
- Part of: No. 86 Wing
- Garrison/HQ: Defence Establishment Fairbairn
- Mottos: Eo et redeo (Latin: "I Go and I Return")
- Aircraft: Boeing 737 MAX 8 BBJ; Dassault Falcon 7X
- Engagements: World War II; Cold War

No. 34 Squadron is a Royal Australian Air Force (RAAF) VIP transport squadron. It operates Boeing 737 Business Jets and Dassault Falcon 7Xs from Defence Establishment Fairbairn in Canberra. The squadron was formed in February 1942 for standard transport duties during World War II, initially flying de Havilland DH.84 Dragons in Northern Australia. In 1943 it re-equipped with Douglas C-47 Dakotas, which it operated in New Guinea and the Dutch East Indies prior to disbanding in June 1946.

The unit was re-established in March 1948 as No. 34 (Communications) Squadron at RAAF Station Mallala, South Australia, where it supported activities at the Woomera Rocket Range before disbanding in October 1955. It was re-raised as No. 34 (VIP) Flight in March 1956 at RAAF Base Canberra (later Fairbairn). No. 34 Flight was redesignated No. 34 (Special Transport) Squadron in July 1959, and No. 34 Squadron in June 1963. During the 1960s it operated Dakotas, Convair Metropolitans, Vickers Viscounts, Dassault Falcon-Mysteres, Hawker Siddeley HS 748s, and BAC 1-11s, the last three types continuing in service until the late 1980s. The squadron's fleet consisted solely of Dassault Falcon 900s from 1989 until 2002, when it began operating the 737 and Bombardier Challenger 604s. The Challengers were replaced with the Falcon 7X in 2019.

== Role and equipment ==
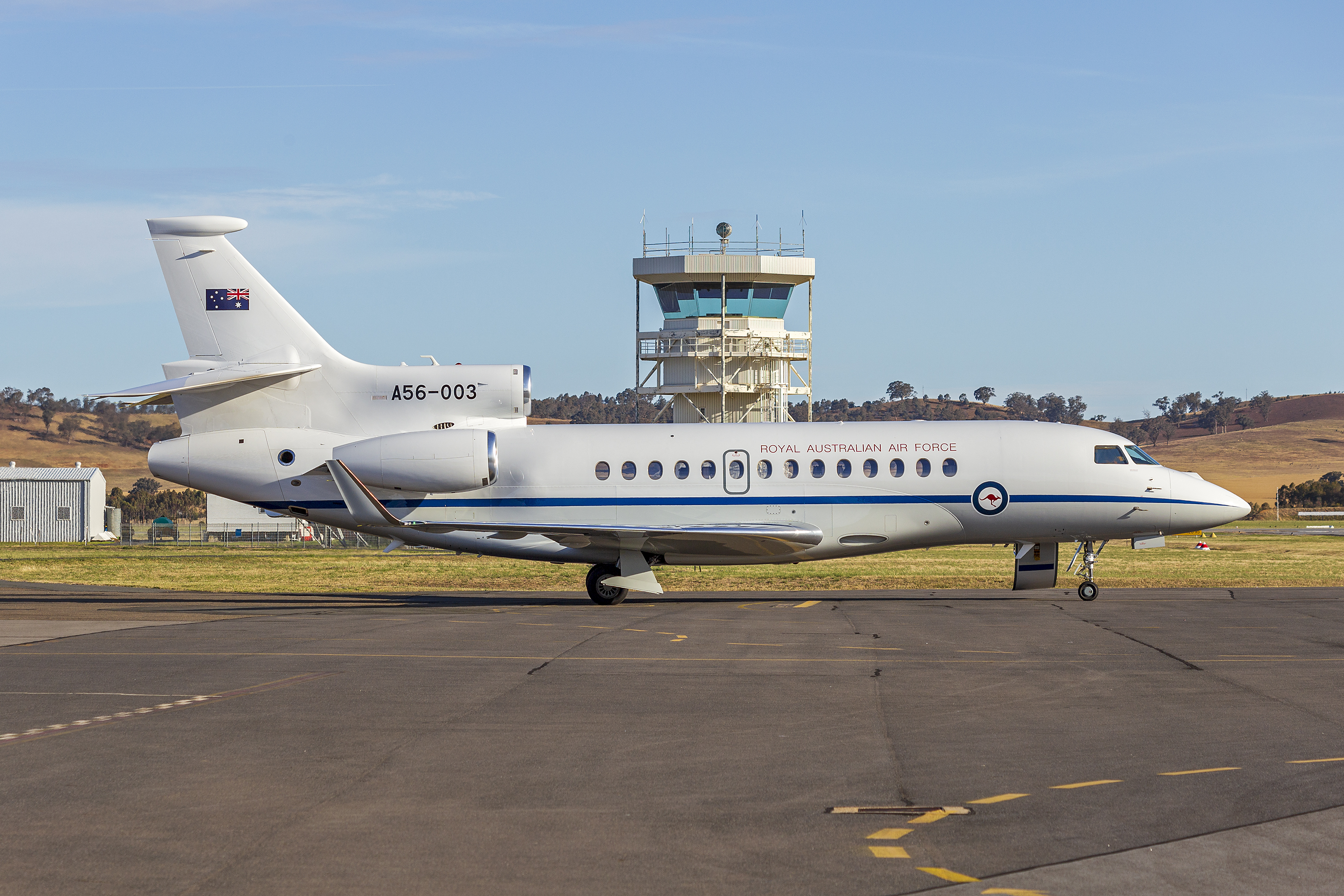
No. 34 Squadron Falcon 7X, November 2019

No. 34 Squadron is the Royal Australian Air Force (RAAF) unit responsible for the transport of VIPs, including members of the Australian government, the Governor-General, senior Australian Defence Force personnel, and visiting dignitaries. It is based at Defence Establishment Fairbairn in Canberra, and administered by No. 86 Wing, which is part of Air Mobility Group. The squadron has a secondary role providing emergency transport during humanitarian operations. Its motto is Eo et redeo ("I Go and I Return").

As at 2011, No. 34 Squadron's strength included around thirty pilots and thirty flight attendants. Captains are generally senior pilots who have previously flown the RAAF's Boeing C-17 Globemaster, Lockheed C-130 Hercules, or Lockheed AP-3C Orion. Their co-pilots are new RAAF personnel who have recently graduated from No. 2 Flying Training School, and the crew attendants are posted to the squadron after completing training and a period of service with No. 33 Squadron. The squadron's VIP Operations Cell (VIPOPS) is responsible for managing requests for VIP air transport as well as dedicated security staff. Most logistical support, including meal preparation, is provided under commercial arrangements rather than by RAAF personnel.

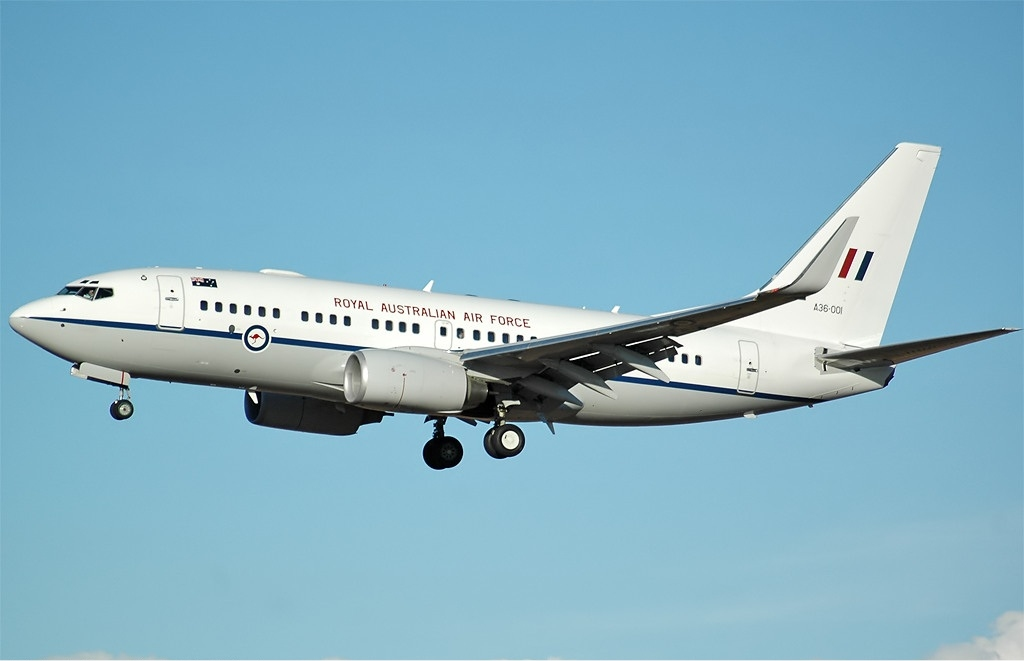
No. 34 Squadron Boeing 737, April 2004

No. 34 Squadron operates two Boeing 737 Business Jets and three Dassault Falcon 7Xs. The aircraft are leased from, and maintained by, Northrop Grumman Integrated Defence Services (previously Qantas Defence Services). The twin-engined Boeing Business Jet (BBJ) is crewed by two pilots and up to four flight attendants, and can carry thirty passengers. The tri-jet Falcon 7X has a crew of two pilots and one flight attendant, and carries up to fourteen passengers. The jets are classified as "Special Purpose Aircraft", meaning that their tasking is governed by Federal guidelines for carrying "entitled persons" on official business. To minimise government outlay, the jets may not be employed when available commercial flights satisfy the timing, location and security requirements of a given task. No. 34 Squadron conducts between 1,200 and 1,800 flights each year. A Schedule of Special Purpose Flights is tabled twice annually in Federal Parliament. VIPOPS usually assigns one of No. 34 Squadron's aircraft to approved tasks, but other Australian Defence Force aircraft are occasionally used for tasks not suited to the BBJ or Challenger; for instance, Prime Minister Julia Gillard travelled to China on board a No. 33 Squadron Airbus KC-30A Multi Role Tanker Transport in April 2013.

== History ==
=== World War II and aftermath ===
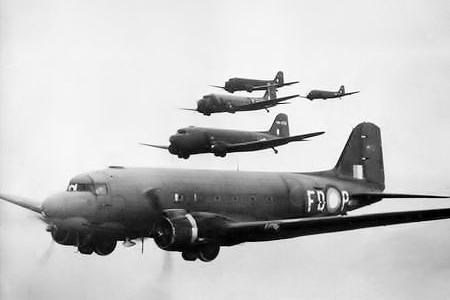
No. 34 Squadron Dakotas over New Guinea, c. 1944

During February and March 1942, the RAAF formed four transport units: Nos. 33, 34, 35 and 36 Squadrons. No. 34 (Transport) Squadron was established on 23 February at RAAF Station Darwin, Northern Territory, four days after the city was bombed for the first time. Coming under the control of North-Western Area Command, the squadron's initial strength was six personnel and two de Havilland DH.84 Dragons. They were immediately tasked with transport duties in northern Australia. As well as carrying freight, this involved collecting the first Japanese prisoner of war to be captured in Australia, a navy fighter pilot who had crashlanded during the raid on Darwin. One of the squadron's two officers, Flight Lieutenant J.W. Warwick, became the first (acting) commanding officer on 2 March. The following day, one of the Dragons was destroyed on the ground at Wyndham, Western Australia, by enemy air attack. With its other aircraft unserviceable, and accommodation at Darwin's civil airfield inadequate, squadron headquarters relocated to Daly Waters Airfield on 5 March. On 14 March another Dragon was allocated; this was joined by two Avro Ansons and two de Havilland Tiger Moths in mid-May, by which time the squadron had moved to Batchelor Airfield. By the end of the month, the squadron had thirty-four personnel, including six officers. It lost one of the Tiger Moths to a bushfire on 1 July, a few days after the plane crashlanded south of Katherine. The squadron relocated again on 15 July, this time to Hughes Airfield. It remained at Hughes until 27 August, when it transferred to Manbulloo Airfield; it operated from Manbulloo until it was temporarily disbanded on 13 December and its aircraft transferred to No. 6 Communications Flight.

No. 34 Squadron was re-formed on 3 January 1943 at Parafield Airport, South Australia, from elements of No. 36 Squadron formerly based at Essendon, Victoria. Initially comprising ninety-six personnel and eight aircraft, by the end of the month the squadron's strength had been reduced to seventy personnel and three Dragons operating in South Australia and the Northern Territory. On 11 March one of the Dragons was destroyed on takeoff at Parafield, causing two deaths—No. 34 Squadron's first fatalities. Another Dragon was lost in a fire after it crashlanded near Tennant Creek in April. Beginning in May 1943, the Dragons were augmented by Douglas C-47 Dakotas, giving the squadron a total strength of three Dakotas and two Dragons by the following month. By July, No. 34 Squadron was operating five Dakotas, which had fully replaced the Dragons, and in August its strength stood at seven Dakotas and 153 personnel, including forty-seven officers. It subsequently received an Airspeed Oxford and a Douglas DC-2, and began making supply drops and medical evacuations as far north as Port Moresby, New Guinea. The squadron had its busiest month in May 1944, transporting almost 1,900 passengers and over 1,000,000 pounds (450,000 kg) of cargo. On 1 June it became the first operational RAAF squadron to have personnel of the Women's Auxiliary Australian Air Force (WAAAF) in its ranks, a contingent made up of an officer and twenty airwomen. The WAAAF had been formed in 1941 and eventually made up thirty-one per cent of RAAF ground staff; its members were primarily employed in technical trades and were not permitted to serve in combat theatres.

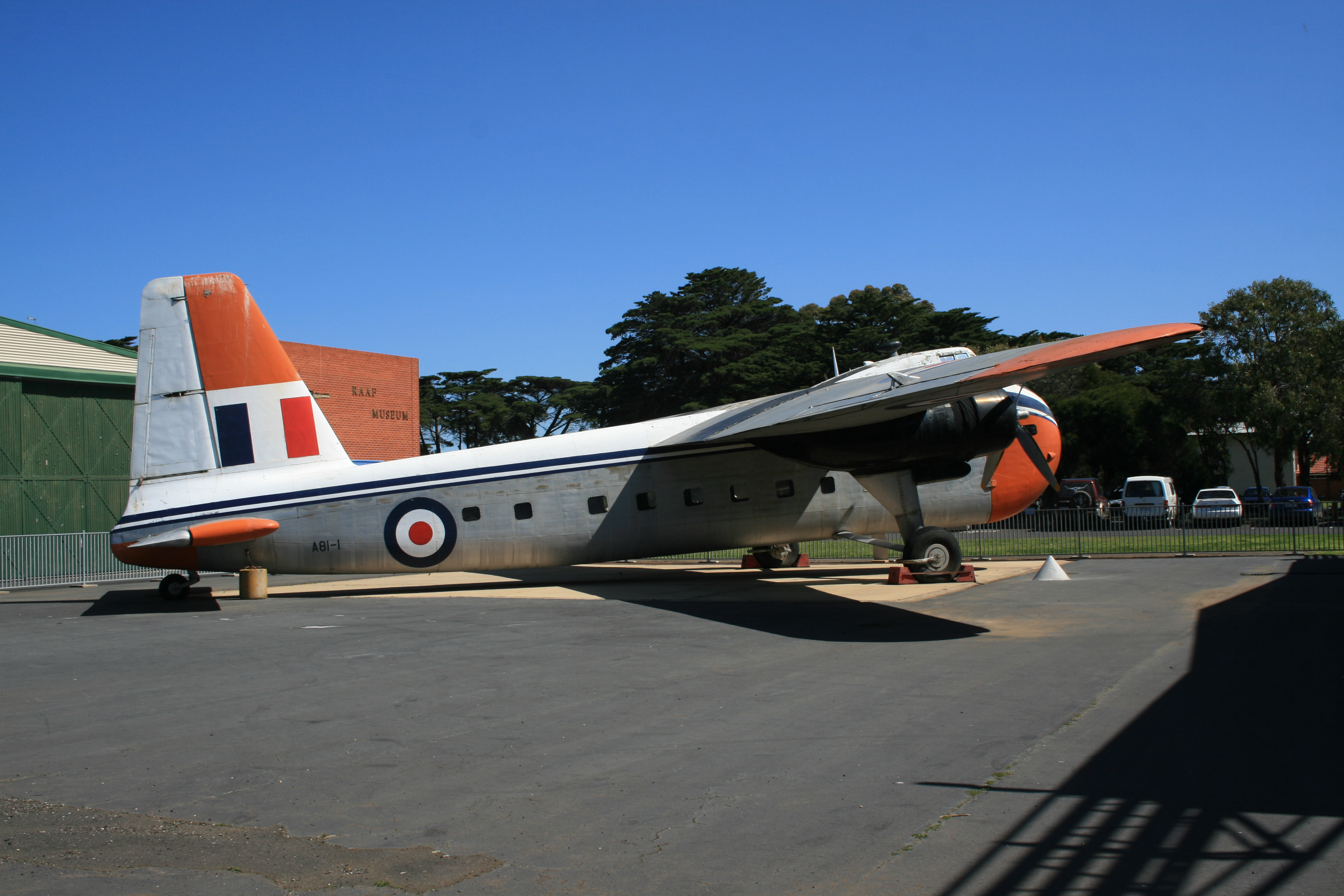
Former No. 34 Squadron Bristol Freighter preserved at RAAF Museum in Point Cook, Victoria

October 1944 saw a detachment of the squadron operating from Cape York in Far North Queensland to bases in the Dutch East Indies. Other detachments were located at Townsville, Queensland, and Coomalie Creek, Northern Territory. In February 1945, No. 34 Squadron commenced a relocation to Morotai in the Dutch East Indies, under the control of the Australian First Tactical Air Force, and was fully established at its new base by mid-April. The squadron supported the invasion of Borneo, and its Dakotas were the first Allied aircraft to land at Labuan and Tarakan after the islands were captured. It remained at Morotai until the end of the war, at which time it became involved in repatriating Australian former prisoners of war from Singapore, and then in courier flights supporting the formation of the British Commonwealth Occupation Force in Japan. No. 34 Squadron returned to Australia between January and March 1946 and disbanded at RAAF Station Richmond, New South Wales, on 6 June.

The squadron was re-established at RAAF Station Mallala, South Australia, on 1 March 1948, when No. 2 (Communications) Squadron was renamed No. 34 (Communications) Squadron. It operated as a VIP transport, courier and reconnaissance unit, primarily in support of the Woomera rocket range, focal point of the Anglo-Australian Long Range Weapons Project during the Cold War. No. 34 (Communications) Squadron flew the only Vickers Viking to be taken on strength by the RAAF, and was also the only RAAF squadron to operate the Bristol Freighter. Three Freighters were taken on strength in April and May 1949, and a fourth in September 1951; one was lost with all three crew members in a crash near Mallala on 25 November 1953 after its wing failed in flight. The squadron also operated Percival Prince, Auster, Dakota and Anson aircraft, undertaking regular transport duties and disaster relief along with its Woomera support work before disbanding at Mallala on 28 October 1955.

=== VIP operations ===
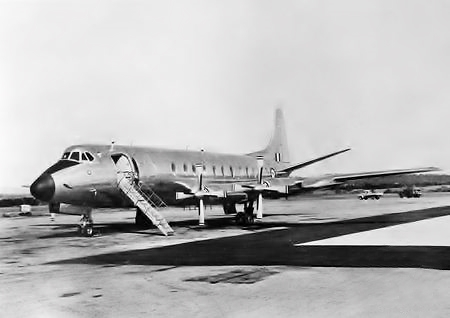
No. 34 Squadron Viscount, Fairbairn, 1964–69

No. 34 (VIP) Flight was established at RAAF Base Canberra on 12 March 1956, and charged with the safe carriage of the Governor-General, senior Australian politicians and military officers, and visiting foreign dignitaries. It was formed from the VIP Flight of No. 36 Squadron, under No. 86 (Transport) Wing. The VIP Flight had absorbed the RAAF's Governor-General's Flight in October 1950. In its first year of operation, No. 34 Flight carried the Duke of Edinburgh on his tour of Australia. It was equipped with two Convair 440 Metropolitans, as well as Dakotas. The flight remained in Canberra when No. 86 Wing relocated to Richmond in 1958. On 1 July 1959, it was re-formed as No. 34 (Special Transport) Squadron, leaving the control of No. 86 Wing to become an independent unit directly administered by Home Command and tasked by RAAF Base Canberra. "Possibly because of the rank of its clients", contended the official history of the post-war Air Force, the squadron maintained higher standards than other transport units, adopting some procedures from the civil aviation world. It also benefitted from the personal interest of senior officials when it came to upgrading its equipment, though this had some negative aspects. The acquisition of the Metropolitans, the first pressurised aircraft in the VIP fleet, was organised by Minister for Air Athol Townley without any advance discussion with the RAAF. Although the Air Force raised performance and safety concerns, the type's entry into service was a fait accompli, and it remained on strength for twelve years. Until the early 1960s, the VIP unit also operated two de Havilland Vampire jets and two CAC Winjeel trainers to allow staff officers at Canberra's Department of Air to maintain their flying proficiency.

No. 34 Squadron RAAF Hangar (right) in Fairbairn

No. 34 (Special Transport) Squadron's home in Canberra was renamed RAAF Base Fairbairn in March 1962, and the unit was redesignated No. 34 Squadron on 13 June 1963. That year, the squadron carried Queen Elizabeth II for the first time. In October 1964, two second-hand Vickers Viscount turboprop transports were obtained to supplement the Dakotas and Convairs; the two piston-engine types were withdrawn after the delivery of two Hawker Siddeley HS 748s beginning in April 1967 and three Dassault Falcon 20 jets (known as Mystere in RAAF service) in June. Two BAC 1-11 jets joined the squadron on 19 January 1968, and the two Viscounts were retired in March the following year. The wholesale re-equipment of the VIP fleet in the late 1960s was controversial, and questions were raised in Parliament regarding its cost and operations. The so-called "VIP affair" led to more stringent guidelines governing No. 34 Squadron's tasking, requiring approval for flights to be made by the British Royal Family, the Governor-General, the Prime Minister, or the Minister for Air. Eligibility criteria were also codified, and potential passengers included Federal ministers, opposition leaders, "individuals of similar status and importance visiting Australia", two-star officers and above, and other dignitaries of similar status. During the 1970s one of No. 34 Squadron's BAC 1-11s experienced an engine failure over the Tasman Sea while carrying Prime Minister Gough Whitlam to New Zealand. The aircraft made a safe landing in Australia, but the incident led the RAAF to investigate using three- or four-engined aircraft for future VIP flights involving long over-water legs. The government eventually purchased two Boeing 707s from Qantas to perform long-range VIP flights and to improve the RAAF's strategic transport capabilities. Entering service in 1979, they joined the newly established No. 33 Flight (later No. 33 Squadron) in 1981. More 707s were acquired between 1983 and 1988, and four were converted for air-to-air refuelling in the early 1990s. In 1984, No. 34 Squadron was awarded the Gloucester Cup for its proficiency.

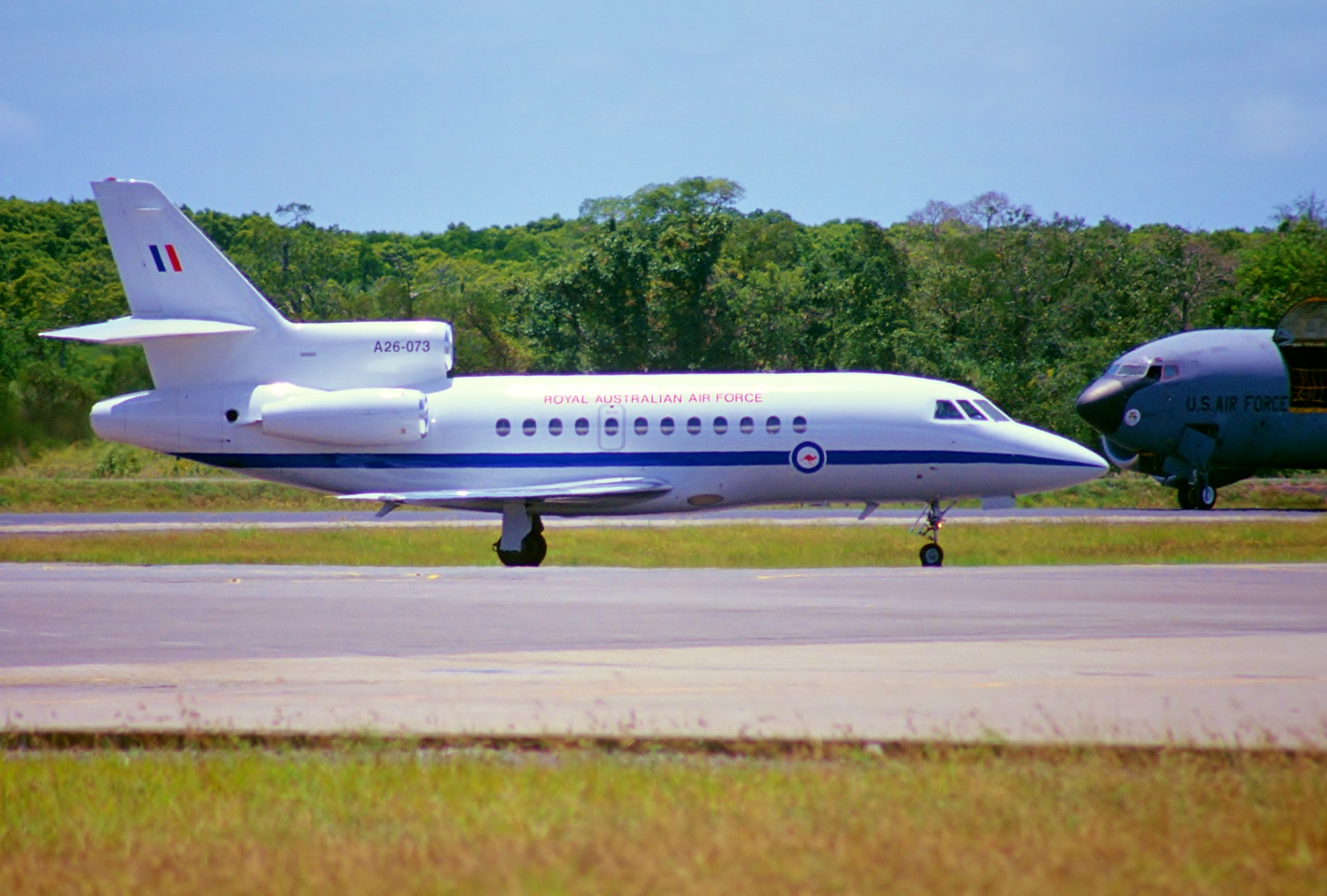
No. 34 Squadron Falcon 900, October 1999

The squadron again became part of No. 86 Wing in June 1988, though its tasking continued to be controlled by the Governor-General, the Prime Minister, and the Minister for Defence. Commencing in September 1989, the twinjet Mysteres and BAC 1-11s were replaced by five trijet Dassault Falcon 900s leased from Hawker Pacific, the first time the RAAF had leased aircraft from a commercial company. The two HS 748s were transferred to the newly formed No. 32 Squadron at RAAF Base East Sale, Victoria. Responsibility for servicing the Falcon 900s was shared by No. 34 Squadron and Hawker Pacific, the latter performing heavy maintenance. In an unusual operation for the squadron, one of the Falcons was dispatched to Jordan in September 1990 to evacuate thirteen Australian citizens who had been held hostage in Iraq. On 21 December 1992, a Falcon 900 became the first RAAF aircraft to take part in United Nations peacekeeping efforts in Somalia, when it departed RAAF Base Amberley, Queensland, with a team of Australian Army personnel to reconnoitre the theatre of operations. The unit received a commendation from the Chief of the Defence Force, General Peter Gration, shortly before his retirement in 1993. In January 1998, No. 84 Wing was organised as a special transport wing under Air Lift Group (renamed Air Mobility Group in April 2014). The term "special transport" referred to activities not directly related to army support, such as carrying VIPs. Headquartered at Richmond, No. 84 Wing took control of Nos. 32, 33 and 34 Squadrons. A flight by one of No. 34 Squadron's Falcons preceded INTERFET operations in East Timor in 1999, carrying senior Australian military and diplomatic staff to Dili on a goodwill mission.

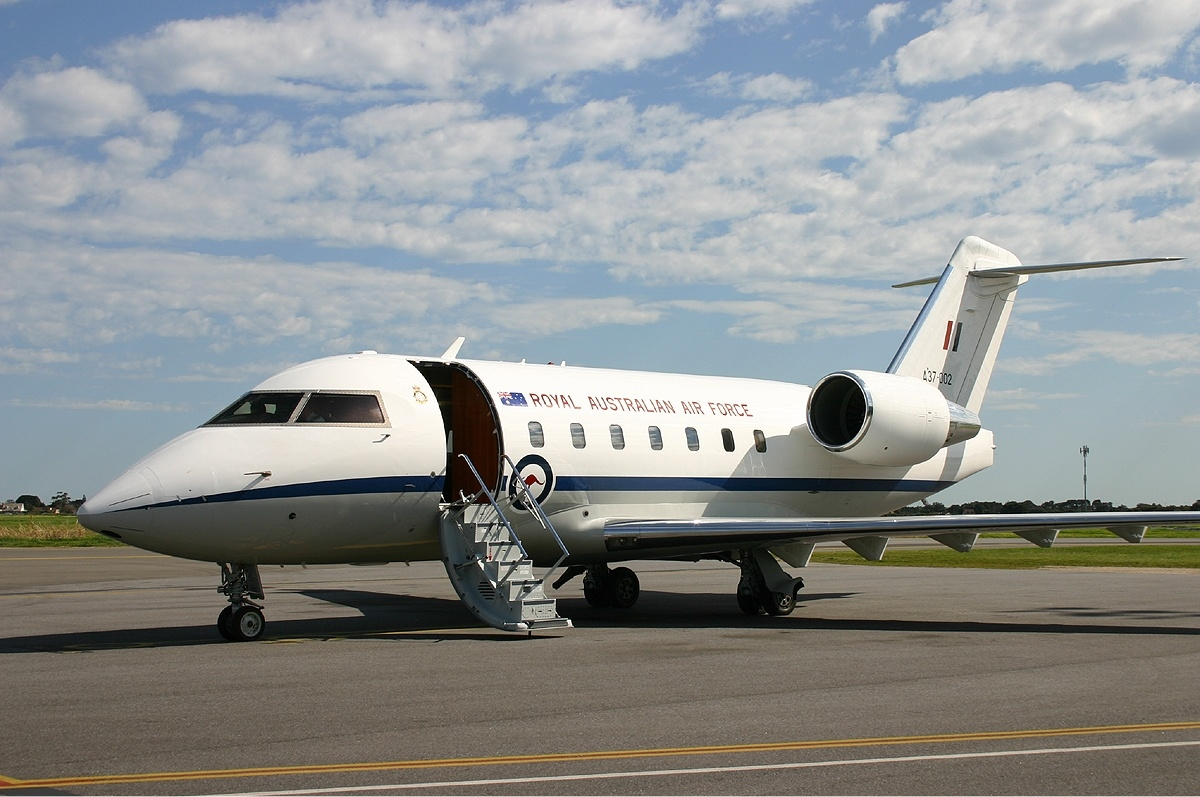
No. 34 Squadron Challenger 604, August 2004

The Falcon 900s were replaced by two Boeing 737 Business Jets and three Bombardier Challenger 604s in July 2002. The new aircraft also replaced the two Boeing 707s operated by No. 33 Squadron in the VIP transport role. The 707s had permitted journalists to travel with the Prime Minister on international flights, and in replacing the bigger jets with 737s the Liberal government of the time determined that media contingents covering VIP trips should travel on civil aircraft. This decision led to controversy in 2007, after the crash of a Garuda airliner killed four Australian government officials and a journalist travelling in connection with a visit to Indonesia by Foreign Minister Alexander Downer, who had flown on a Challenger. No. 34 Squadron and Qantas Defence Services marked 20,000 incident-free flying hours with the 737s and Challengers on 21 October 2008. The following year saw further controversy when Prime Minister Kevin Rudd had to apologise for remarks to a cabin attendant over the meal he was served on one of the jets. In 2011, the squadron provided VIP transport during tours of Australia by Queen Elizabeth, Prince William, and Frederik and Mary of Denmark, as well as support for US President Barack Obama's visit to Canberra. It also flew senior government and military personnel in support of relief efforts during the Queensland floods, and was again awarded the Gloucester Cup for proficiency. No. 34 Squadron celebrated its 70th anniversary at Parliament House, Canberra, on 18 February 2012; the following day, a memorial to its first fatalities in March 1942 was unveiled at Fairbairn.

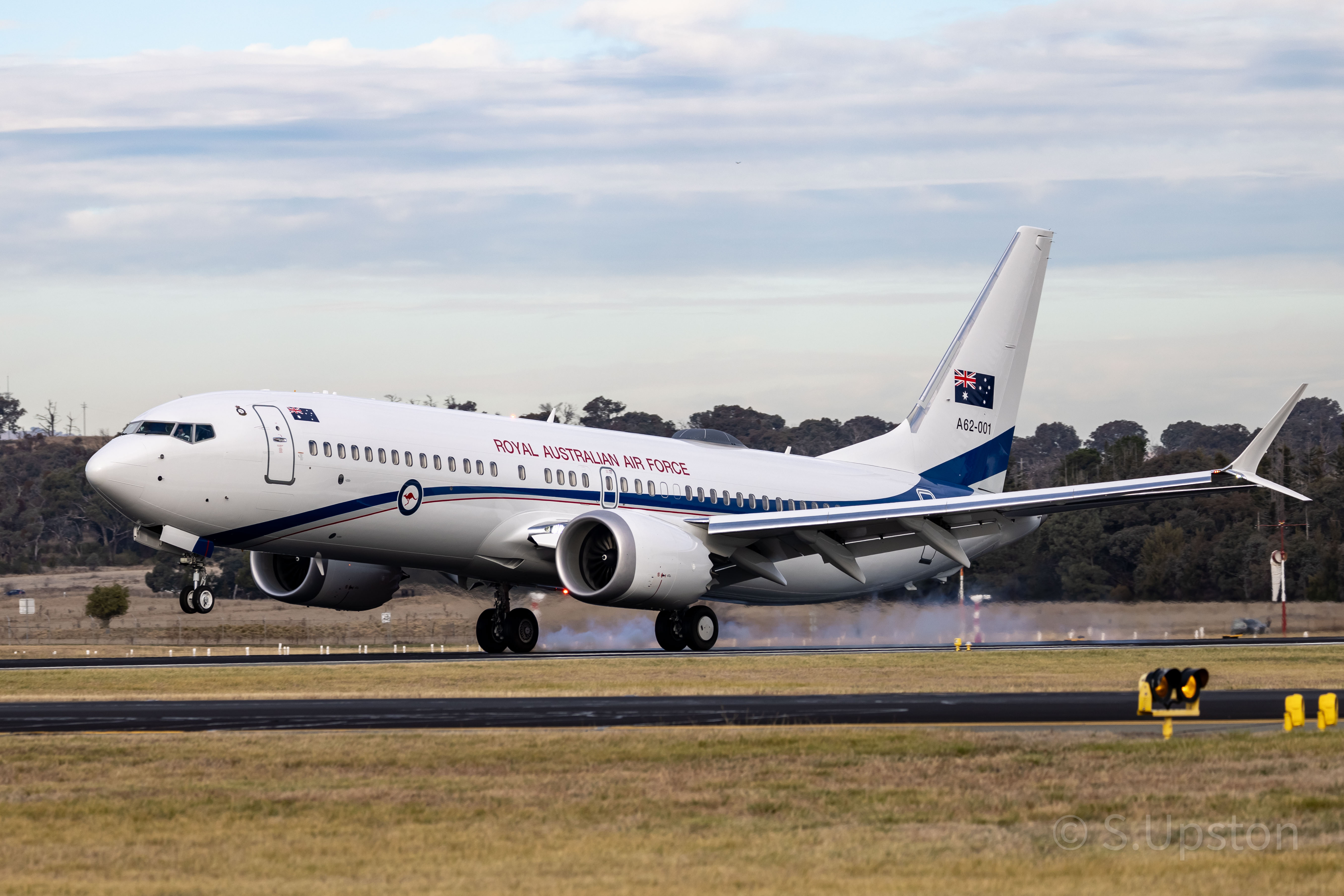
The RAAF's first Boeing 737 MAX 8 touching down in Canberra on 12 July 2024

On 13 October 2017, No. 34 Squadron was transferred from No. 84 Wing to No. 86 Wing. The squadron's Challengers were replaced with three Dassault Falcon 7Xs in 2019. The new aircraft were larger and longer-ranged than the Challengers, and carried more advanced communications equipment. In April 2020, No. 34 Squadron was awarded the Gloucester Cup for its performance the previous year. The 737s failed to achieve their programmed flying hours from around 2020 due to the age of the aircraft and need for maintenance. They also suffered from reliability problems; one incident caused an important National Cabinet meeting to be delayed when Prime Minister Scott Morrison was unable to depart from Cairns. As a result, in December 2021 the government decided to replace the 737s with two Boeing 737 MAX 8 aircraft, provided by the National Australia Bank; they were scheduled to enter service in 2024 and be retained until 2036. The RAAF's first Boeing 737 MAX 8 arrived in Australia on 12 July 2024.

== See also ==
- Royal Australian Air Force VIP aircraft
- Air transports of heads of state and government
