= Cressy Aerodrome =

Airport in Victoria, Australia

- IATA: none; ICAO: YCRE

Summary
- Airport type: Private
- Serves: Cressy
- Location: Cressy
- Elevation AMSL: 420 ft / 128 m
- Coordinates: 38°2′24″S 143°39′10″E
- Website: www.cressyaerodrome.com.au

Map
- Location in Victoria

Runways
Direction	Length		Surface
Direction	m	ft	Surface
01/19	1,100	3,609	Grass
15/33	900	2,953	Grass
- Sources: AIP

Cressy Aerodrome (ICAO: YCRE) is a small airfield located approximately 2 km (1.2 mi) east of Cressy in western Victoria, Australia.

== History ==
It opened in 1939 as a Royal Australian Air Force training base as both RAAF Base Laverton and RAAF Base Point Cook had no space for additional aircraft. It was home to the Armaments Training School, General Reconnaissance School and Central Gunnery School during World War II. It was taken over by the RAAF Care & Maintenance Unit on 1 January 1946 and closed on 17 July that year. The site was offered to the Department of Works and Housing as a migrant accommodation camp, which also examined relocating the buildings to the Maryport Government Rehabilitation Centre at Mount Martha, but the cost was prohibitive.

The site remained abandoned until was reopened in as a private airfield and museum in 2020. A new hangar was constructed on the site of the original WW2 Bellman hangars. In June 2023 a development application was lodged for the construction of 10 additional hangars.

As of 2024, the airfield was home to a de Havilland Tiger Moth named Millie, which is used for historical events and joy flights.

== See also ==
- List of airports in Victoria
