= Warkworth Aerodrome =

- IATA: none; ICAO: YWKW

Summary
- Airport type: Satellite aerodrome (dispersal)
- Location: Warkworth, New South Wales, Australia
- Built: 1942
- Occupants: Royal Australian Air Force
- Coordinates: 32.549128°S 151.024246°E
- Interactive map of Warkworth Aerodrome

Runways
Direction	Length		Surface
Direction	ft	m	Surface
10/28

Warkworth Aerodrome is an aerodrome constructed in 1942 by the Royal Australian Air Force as a satellite aerodrome north of Warkworth, New South Wales, Australia during World War II.

The runway ran south west to north east and was 1,500 feet (460 m) long x 150 feet (46 m) wide. The aerodrome was used as a dispersal satellite field for RAAF Station Bulga near Singleton.

The aerodrome is currently the home of the Hunter Valley Gliding Club Co-Op.
