= Ringwood Aerodrome =

- IATA: none; ICAO: none

Summary
- Airport type: Satellite aerodrome
- Location: Eagleton, New South Wales, Australia
- Built: 1942
- Occupants: Royal Australian Air Force

Ringwood Aerodrome was an aerodrome constructed in 1942 by the Royal Australian Air Force as a satellite aerodrome near Eagleton, New South Wales, Australia during World War II.

The runway ran south west to north east and was 5,000 feet (1,500 m) long x 150 feet (46 m) wide. The aerodrome was used as a satellite field for RAAF Base Williamtown near Newcastle.
