= Dungog Aerodrome =

- IATA: none; ICAO: none

Summary
- Airport type: Satellite aerodrome (maintenance)
- Location: Wallarobba, New South Wales, Australia
- Built: 1942
- Occupants: Royal Australian Air Force

Dungog Aerodrome was an aerodrome constructed in 1942 by the Royal Australian Air Force as a satellite aerodrome east of Wallarobba, New South Wales, Australia during World War II.

The runway ran south west to north east and was 1,500 feet (460 m) long x 150 feet (46 m) wide. The aerodrome was as a maintenance satellite field for RAAF Base Williamtown near Newcastle.

The aerodrome was abandoned after World War II.
