= Tuggerah Aerodrome =

Tuggerah Aerodrome
- IATA: none; ICAO: none

Summary
- Airport type: Dispersal & Landing Ground
- Location: Tuggerah, New South Wales, Australia
- Built: 1942
- Occupants: Royal Australian Air Force & United States Navy

Runways
Direction	Length		Surface
Direction	ft	m	Surface
	5,000	1,524

Tuggerah Aerodrome was an aerodrome constructed in 1942 by the Royal Australian Air Force as a dispersal ground and landing ground at Tuggerah, New South Wales, Australia during World War II.

The runway ran south west to north east and was 5000 ft long by 150 ft wide. The aerodrome had eight hideouts for medium bombers constructed. The United States Navy's Fleet Air Wing leased the aerodrome as a satellite field for Fleurs Aerodrome near Kemps Creek, New South Wales.

The aerodrome was abandoned after World War II.
