= Weebo Station =

Pastoral lease in Western Australia

Coordinates: 28.0062°S 121.0786°E

Location in Western Australia

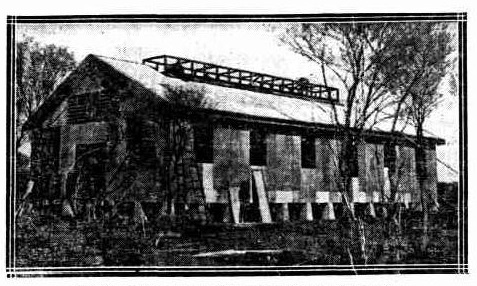
Weebo Shearing Shed erected 1928

Weebo or Weebo Station is a pastoral lease that has operated as both a sheep and cattle station located about 50 kilometres (31 mi) south of Leinster and about 90 kilometres (56 mi) north west of Leonora in the Goldfields region of Western Australia. The name comes from an Aboriginal word wipu meaning "tail".

The property occupies an area of 2,852 square kilometres (1,101 sq mi) and is able to carry a herd of approximately 2,000 cattle. The station has a large homestead and two cottages, each with three bedrooms. Stock are watered at 63 water points around the property.

The traditional owners of the area are the Kuwarra people, who have inhabited the area for thousands of years.

The property was initially established by Pierce and Gilmore, who acquired the 200,000-acre (80,937 ha) lease prior to 1901. They stocked the property with 1,000 sheep, 250 cattle and 50 horses. The property adjoined Ducie Downs at this time. Gilmore sold the 262,000-acre (106,028 ha) property in 1926 to W. H. Nicholls. Sir Walter James then acquired the property in 1927.

A new shearing shed was constructed in 1928 by James and his partner, Thurbyshire, with 5,199 sheep being shorn producing 116 bales of wool.

In 1960 the property was stocked with 9,504 sheep, which were shorn to produce 270 bales of wool.

Western Mining Corporation applied for 16 mineral leases over an area of 3,000 acres (1,214 ha) to search for nickel and other metals.

In 2009 the lease was owned by Nickel West, a subsidiary of BHP, and was managed by Simon Kopke. Prior to 2008 Weebo was running 8,000 sheep but was completely destocked that year after experiencing problems with wild dogs. Kopke introduced a herd of 200 goats onto the property for the domestic meat market into one 80-square-kilometre (31 sq mi) paddock. The goats were being protected by an electrified fence and four Maremma dogs.

The property was sold by BHP Nickel West in December 2015 and purchased by B & SL Prosser. Since purchase the station has been converted from grazing sheep and goats to cattle.

== See also ==
- List of ranches and stations

== Sources ==
- Liberman, Kenneth (Spring 1980). "The Decline of the Kuwarra People of Australia's Western Desert: A Case Study of Legally Secured Domination". Ethnohistory. 27 (2): 119–133. doi:10.2307/481223. JSTOR 481223.
- https://www.realestate.com.au/sold/property-livestock-wa-leinster-7767985
