= Camden Airport (New South Wales) =

Airport serving Sydney, New South Wales, Australia

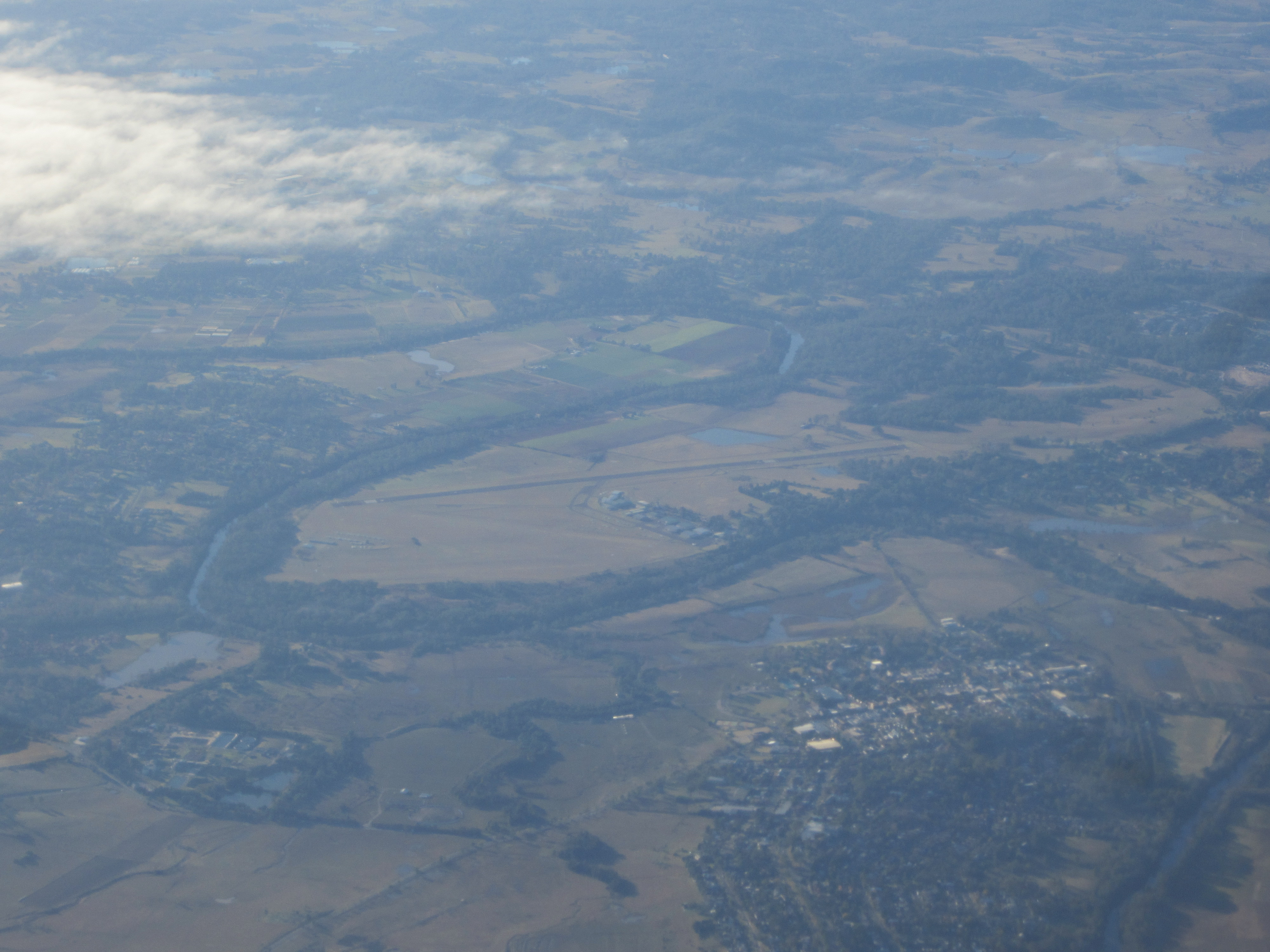
- IATA: CDU; ICAO: YSCN

Summary
- Airport type: Public
- Operator: Aeria Management Group
- Serves: Macarthur Region
- Location: Camden, New South Wales
- Elevation AMSL: 230 ft (70 m)
- Coordinates: 34°02′24″S 150°41′12″E
- Website: https://aeria.co/camden/

Map
- Location in Sydney

Runways
Direction	Length		Surface
Direction	m	ft	Surface
06/24	1,464	4,803	Asphalt
10/28	723	2,372	Grass

Statistics (2011)
- Aircraft movements: 104,510
- Source: AIP and Movements at Australian Airports from Airservices Australia

Camden Airport (IATA: CDU, ICAO: YSCN) is an aerodrome located on the outskirts of Sydney, 1 nautical mile (1.9 km; 1.2 mi) northwest of Camden, New South Wales, Australia. The airport is located approximately 60 km (37 mi) from Sydney's central business district. It is situated on 200 ha (490 acres) of land and is used as a general aviation overflow airport for the busier Bankstown Airport, and provides facilities for gliding and ballooning. The aerodrome has one grass runway and one paved runway and two glider airstrips. It is in the south-west corner of the designated Sydney flight training area.

== History ==
=== Early history ===
A racecourse owned by prominent local grazier Arthur Macarthur-Onslow originally occupied the site of the Camden aerodrome. The shooting of the film Silks and Saddles at the track involved an Avro 504K biplane piloted by Edgar Percival landing on the set, and the occasion led to Macarthur-Onslow's sons Edward, Denzil and Andrew displaying a keen interest in aviation. By 1935, the Macarthur-Onslow family owned several aircraft including a de Havilland Hornet Moth and a Comper Swift which they stored in a shed on the property. The boys established the Macquarie Grove Flying School on the property in 1938; however, the operations of the school would be wound back significantly when Edward Macarthur-Onslow, now responsible for Macquarie Grove Aerodrome and the associated flying school, offered the facility to the government following the outbreak of war.

=== World War II ===
Originally a private airstrip, the area that was to become Camden Aerodrome was utilised by the Royal Australian Air Force (RAAF) and other Allied air forces during World War II.

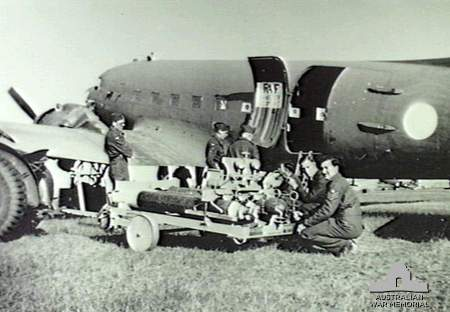
A C-47 Dakota and crew of No. 243 Squadron RAF at Camden in 1945

Camden airfield hosted Nos. 4, 15, 21, 32 and 78 RAAF Squadrons at various stages during the war. In addition the Central Flying School operated between 1940 and 1942, and a British transport unit, No. 243 Squadron RAF, was based at Camden during the latter part of World War II. Camden was also the No.13 Operational Base. By 1946 the airfield had been returned to its civil status.

In May 1942, No. 4 Squadron RAAF moved to Camden from Canberra equipped with CAC Wirraways, but were redeployed to Kingaroy, Queensland, in September.

No. 15 Squadron RAAF was formed as a maritime patrol unit at Camden on 27 January 1944 equipped with Australian built versions of the Bristol Beaufort torpedo bomber. The squadron maintained detachments at Camden until the end of the war, although it was based at other airfields for short periods.

No. 21 Squadron RAAF arrived at Camden in January 1944 from New Guinea to re-equip with Consolidated B-24 Liberators. The conversion was complete by July, and the squadron departed to forward operating bases in northern Australia.

The Lockheed Hudson equipped No. 32 Squadron RAAF deployed to Camden in November 1942. While stationed at Camden, the squadron performed anti-submarine patrols and was re-equipped with Beaufort torpedo bombers. The base hosted the squadron until May 1944 when it was redeployed to Lowood, Queensland.

No. 78 Squadron RAAF, equipped with P-40 Kittyhawk fighters was formed on 20 July 1943 at RAAF Base Camden. The squadron trained here until it was operational and deployed to Kiriwina Island in November.

No. 83 Squadron RAAF equipped with Australian built CAC Boomerang fighters arrived at Camden from Gove in the Northern Territory in August 1944. The squadron had moved to nearby Menangle by early 1945.

From late 1944 until April 1946, Camden was the main base for No. 300 Group RAF, which flew transport aircraft in support of the British Pacific Fleet.

The Camden War Cemetery, located in the Camden General Cemetery, contains twenty three graves comprising four Australian Army, two Royal Air Force and seventeen Royal Australian Air Force personnel. Most of those buried here died in three separate air training accidents.

=== Satellite airfields ===
- The Oaks Airfield
- Menangle Airfield

=== Post war ===
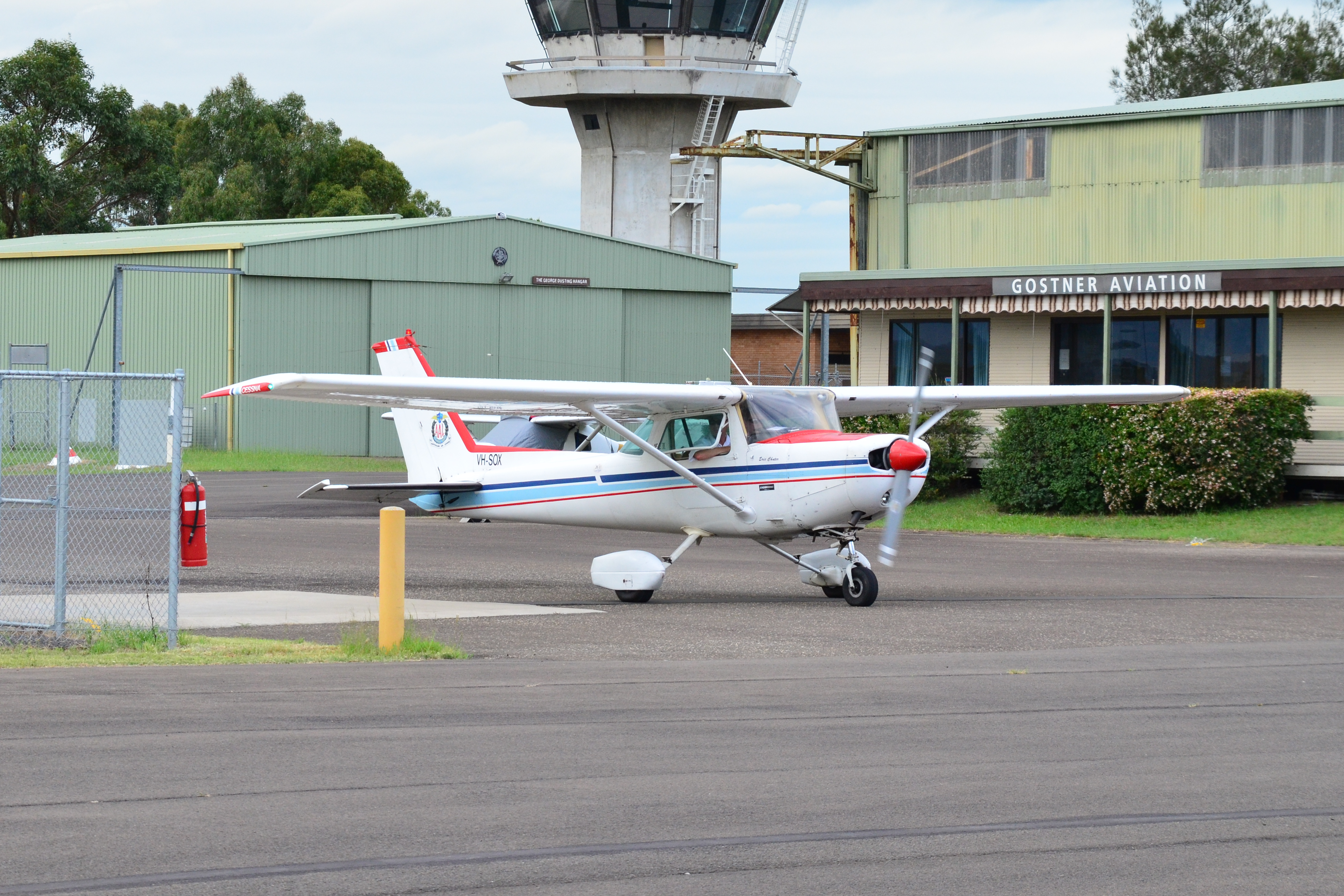
Australian Air League Cessna 152 at Camden Airport

In 1946, ownership of the airport was transferred to the Department of Civil Aviation who oversaw the development of further civil aviation infrastructure on the site including the sealing of runway 06/24. By 1962, a control tower had been built on the site, and in 1978 the primary taxiway providing access between the apron and runway was sealed. In 1988, the airport was transferred to the Federal Airports Corporation and throughout the 1990s further improvements were made to the system of taxiways and aprons to improve aircraft circulation and traffic flow. Major works in 1997 saw all sealed aprons, runways and taxiways resurfaced.

In 1968, the Camden Museum of Aviation was established at Camden Airport. It moved to another location at Harrington Park in 1976.

The FAC was wound down in 1998 and Camden was transferred along with Bankstown, the former Hoxton Park Airport and Kingsford Smith Airport to Sydney Airports Corporation Limited, but at this stage was still a government controlled enterprise.

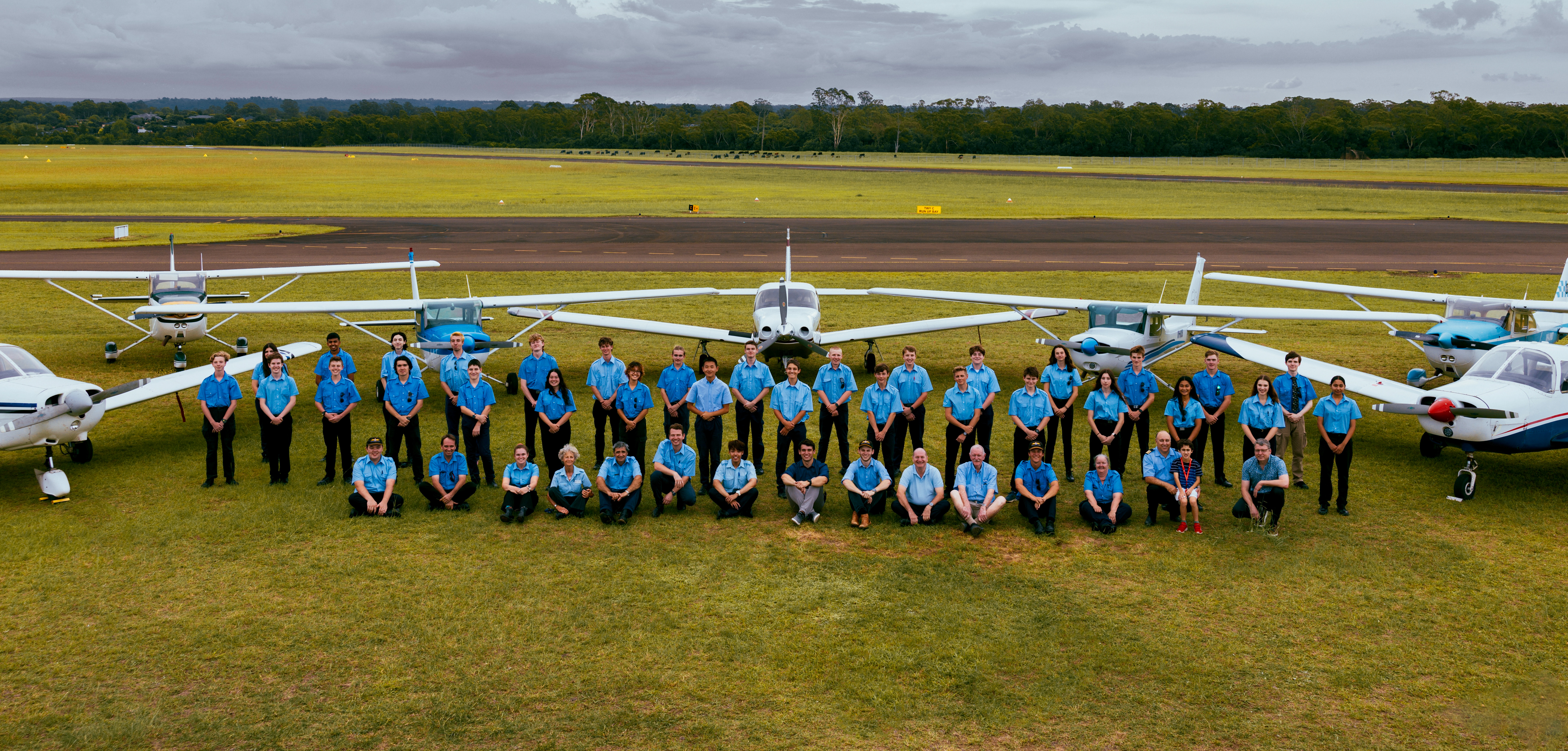
Photograph of student pilots and staff members of the Royal Aero Club of New South Wales at Camden Airport

In 2003, it was controversially sold by the Australian government to a private company, along with Bankstown and Hoxton Park. It is now mostly used by trainee pilots for flying schools, Royal Aero Club of New South Wales, Phoenix Aero Club, the Australian Air League NSW Air Activities Centre, No. 3 Wing Australian Air Force Cadets, Scouts Australia NSW Air Activity Centre, Southern Cross Gliding Club, hot air ballooning and other forms of general aviation.

The airport was used as the car-testing track for the television series Top Gear Australia.

In 2020 a Preliminary Draft Master Plan (MP) has been prepared for public review and comment.

== Radio procedures ==
Camden operates as an ICAO Class D airport from 8:00 am to 6:00 pm. At other times it is a Common Traffic Advisory Frequency airport.

== See also ==
- List of airports in Greater Sydney
- List of airports in New South Wales
- Transport in Australia
