= Hoxton Park Airport =

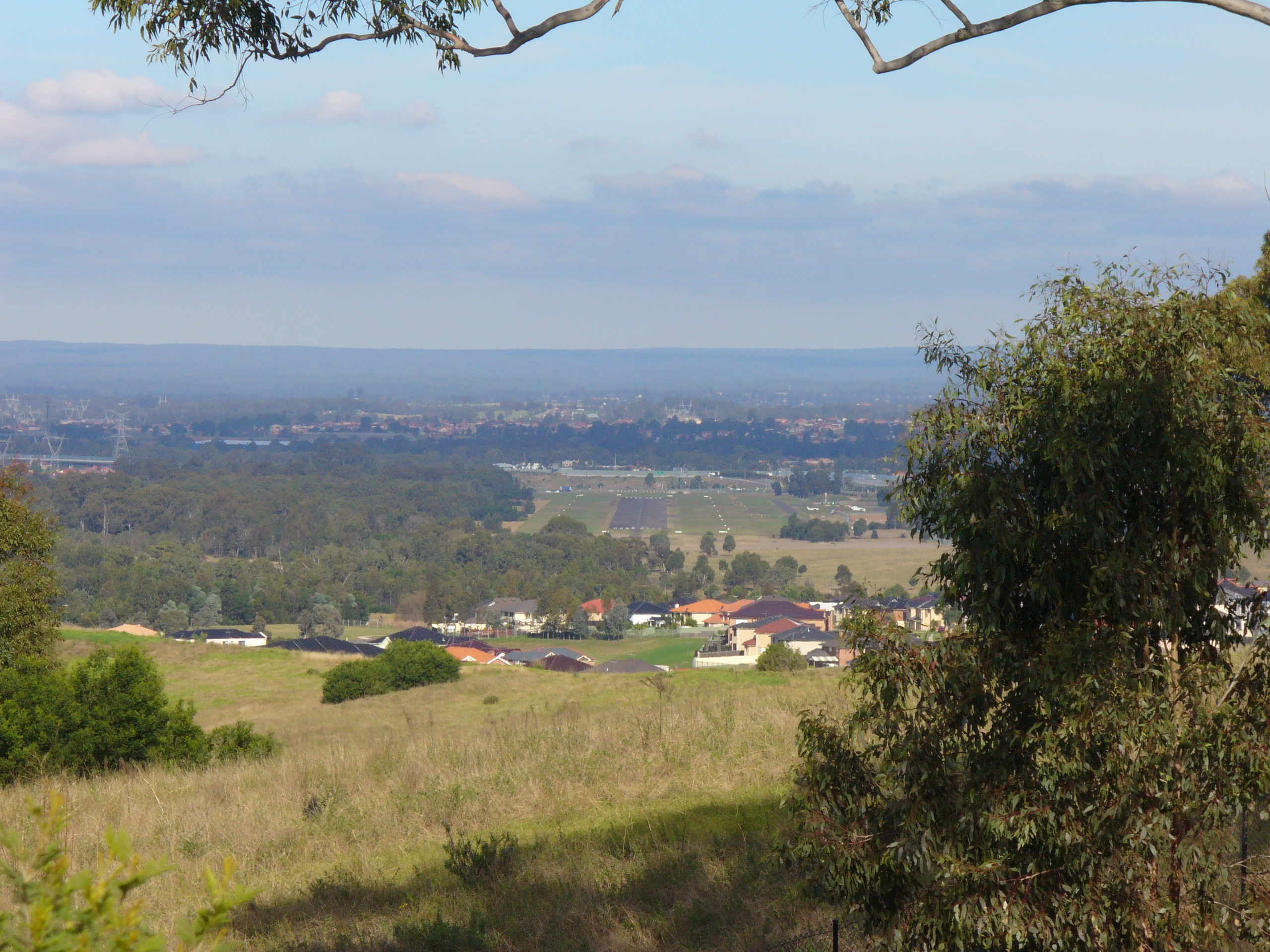
- IATA: none; ICAO: ~~YHOX~~

Summary
- Airport type: Public
- Operator: Sydney Metropolitan Airports Management Companies
- Location: Sydney
- Elevation AMSL: 135 ft / 41 m
- Coordinates: 33°54′35″S 150°51′08″E

Map
- Location in Sydney

Runways
Direction	Length		Surface
Direction	m	ft	Surface
~~16/34~~	~~1,098~~	~~3,602~~	~~Asphalt~~
- Sources: Australian Heritage Database

Hoxton Park Airport (ICAO: YHOX) was a general aviation aerodrome in south-western Sydney, New South Wales, Australia.

The aerodrome was non-towered, and so operated according to Common Traffic Advisory Frequency (CTAF) procedures.

Traffic was light; at the time of closure three fixed wing and one rotary wing flight training schools operated from this aerodrome, which bordered on a large flight training area, serving Sydney's general aviation community. A commercial skydiving operation was also based at the aerodrome. A self-service AVGAS bowser was available.

== History ==
The aerodrome was constructed as part of a group of airfields to be used as aircraft dispersal fields in the event of Japanese air attack on the Sydney area. Aircraft revetment hideouts were constructed within adjacent vegetation to hide and disperse aircraft. The aerodrome was used as an emergency and training field and satellite field for Schofields, Bankstown and Camden during World War II by the Royal Australian Air Force.

The original airstrip was 5,000 by 172 ft (1,524 by 52 m) but it was shortened after World War II. Several aircraft revetments that existed in the farmland to the west of the aerodrome may have been removed (possibly destroyed during the construction of the M7 motorway).

The aerodrome got caught up with the development of Western Sydney and closed permanently on 15 December 2008.

The runway was dug up and permanently destroyed on 16 December 2008. The taxiways were initially left in place but were destroyed with the hangars and airport buildings in early 2009.

The land on which the airport once stood now contains a number of industrial warehouses, a bus depot, and a hardware store.

== See also ==
- List of airports in Greater Sydney
- List of airports in New South Wales
