= Wilfred Arthur =

Australian fighter pilot (1919–2000)

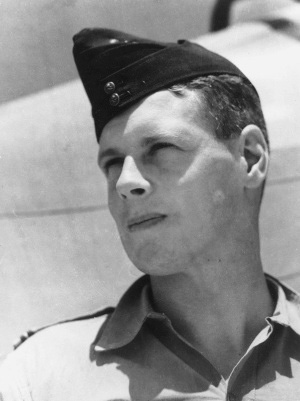
- Arthur in Palestine, June 1941
- Born: 7 December 1919; Sydney
- Died: 23 December 2000 (aged 81); Darwin, Northern Territory
- Military career
- Allegiance: Australia
- Service/branch: Royal Australian Air Force
- Service years: 1939–1946
- Rank: Group Captain
- Nicknames: "Woof", "Wolf", "Wulf", "Bandy"
- Service number: 565
- Units: No. 3 Squadron (1940–42); No. 76 Squadron (1942); No. 71 Wing (1943)
- Commands: No. 75 Squadron (1943); No. 2 Operational Training Unit (1944); No. 81 Wing (1944–45); No. 78 Wing (1945)
- Conflicts: World War II; Middle East theatre; Western Desert campaign; Syria–Lebanon campaign; South West Pacific theatre; New Guinea campaign; Battle of Tarakan
- Awards: Distinguished Service Order; Distinguished Flying Cross; Mention in Despatches (2)

Wilfred Stanley Arthur, DSO, DFC (7 December 1919 – 23 December 2000) was a fighter ace and senior officer of the Royal Australian Air Force (RAAF) during World War II. Commonly known as "Woof", he was officially credited with ten aerial victories. As a commander, he led combat formations at squadron and wing level, becoming at twenty-four the youngest group captain in the history of the RAAF.

Born in Sydney and raised in rural Queensland, Arthur enlisted in the RAAF the day after Australia joined the war in September 1939. He first saw action the following year with No. 3 (Army Cooperation) Squadron in the Middle East, flying Gloster Gladiators initially, and later Hawker Hurricanes and P-40 Tomahawks. He achieved victories in all three types against German and Italian opponents, and was awarded the Distinguished Flying Cross for shooting down four aircraft in a single sortie in November 1941. The next month Arthur married a young woman he met in Alexandria, and organised for her to travel with him on his troopship when he was posted back to Australia in January 1942.

After a brief stint flying P-40 Kittyhawks with No. 76 Squadron in Queensland in April 1942, Arthur served as an instructor with No. 2 Operational Training Unit (OTU) in Victoria. In January 1943 he was posted to New Guinea to command another Kittyhawk unit, No. 75 Squadron. He received the Distinguished Service Order in April for continuing to lead an attack on a formation of Japanese bombers after discovering that his guns were inoperable. Appointed wing leader of No. 71 Wing, Arthur was involved in a runway collision with an RAAF Spitfire in November and suffered severe burns necessitating repatriation to Australia. After recovering, he attended a staff course before taking charge of No. 2 OTU. In December 1944 he was posted to the Dutch East Indies to command No. 81 Wing and, later, No. 78 Wing. Twice mentioned in despatches during the war, Arthur also played a leading part in—and gave name to—the "Morotai Mutiny" of April 1945, when eight RAAF officers attempted to resign their commissions in protest against apparently worthless ground-attack operations. Pursuing business interests in Australia and Vietnam following his discharge from the RAAF after the war, he settled in Darwin, Northern Territory, in 1967 and died there in 2000.

== Early life ==
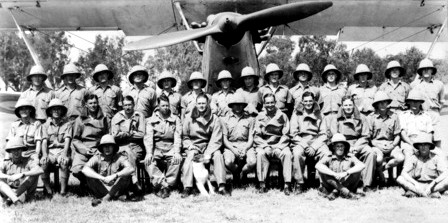
Arthur (front row, second from right) with fellow cadets and instructors at Richmond, 1940

Wilfred Stanley Arthur was the son of stock inspector Stanley Oswald Darley Arthur from Inverell, New South Wales, and his English-born wife Helena Elizabeth Chaffers-Welsh. Stanley Arthur was a veteran of World War I, serving with the Australian Army Veterinary Corps in Egypt and France; two of his brothers also saw active service.

Born in Sydney on 7 December 1919, Arthur grew up around Yelarbon, Queensland, near the New South Wales border. His early education was by correspondence, but he later attended Yelarbon State School, commuting on horseback. In 1935 he began boarding at the Scots College in Warwick, where he matriculated; he was also a member of the school cadet corps and excelled in sports such as cricket, tennis, swimming, athletics, and shooting. Known by his father's forename in youth, Arthur later gained an array of appellations including "Bandy", "Wilf", "Wolf", and "Wulf", but most commonly "Woof".

Aged nineteen and still at the Scots College, Arthur applied to join the Royal Australian Air Force (RAAF). He enlisted on 4 September 1939, the day after Australia's entry into World War II. Training at RAAF Station Point Cook, Victoria, and RAAF Station Richmond, New South Wales, he was commissioned a pilot officer on 3 March 1940, despite being prone to airsickness early on. His initial flying duties were with No. 22 (City of Sydney) Squadron, which operated Hawker Demons and Avro Ansons.

== Combat service ==
=== Middle East ===
Arthur was posted to No. 3 (Army Cooperation) Squadron on 27 March 1940. On 15 July, the squadron departed Sydney for the Middle East to support the 6th Division in the Western Desert campaign against Italian forces. Sailing via Bombay, the unit arrived in Suez, Egypt, on 23 August. Arthur was promoted to flying officer on 3 September. On 2 November, two flights of the squadron moved forward to Gerawla, near Mersa Matruh, equipped with Gloster Gladiator biplane fighters. Arthur achieved his first aerial victory by shooting down a Fiat CR.42 biplane north-west of Sofafi, Egypt, on 12 December. He was in a patrol of five Gladiators that encountered seventeen of the Italian fighters, three of which the Australians claimed destroyed without loss to themselves. The next day Arthur was shot down by a CR.42, one of eight that engaged six Gladiators while they were attacking a formation of Savoia-Marchetti SM.79 bombers near Sollum; five of the Gladiators were forced down against three Italian aircraft destroyed. Bailing out, Arthur narrowly avoided disaster when he became entangled first with his oxygen hose and then with the Gladiator's wing-bracing wires; he was only torn loose at a height of 1,000 feet (300 m) by the force of rushing air as his stricken plane fell to Earth. Arthur was credited with another CR.42 destroyed, and one damaged, north-east of Sollum Bay on 26 December, when his squadron attacked a formation of SM.79s escorted by over twenty CR.42s.

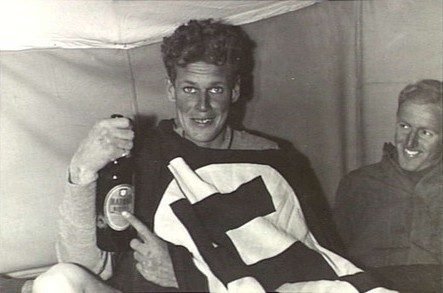
Flight Lieutenant Arthur draped in a German flag following action on 30 November 1941, when he shot down four enemy aircraft, winning the DFC

On 22 January 1941, Arthur and Flying Officer Alan Rawlinson were despatched in Gladiators to attack an Italian schooner off Tobruk; they machine-gunned the vessel, setting it on fire. No. 3 Squadron began re-equipping with Hawker Hurricane monoplane fighters on 29 January. On 10 February, the squadron advanced to RAF Station Benina to take over the air defence of Benghazi, which had been occupied by the 6th Division. German aircraft began appearing at this time, as the Afrika Korps and a Luftwaffe contingent under General Erwin Rommel arrived in North Africa to reinforce the Italians; the Germans launched an offensive in March, and Benina was evacuated on 3 April. No. 3 Squadron eventually re-located to Sidi Haneish in Egypt on 12 April, having retreated 500 miles (800 km) and operated from nine airfields in ten days. Arthur was flying a Hurricane when he shot down a Messerschmitt Bf 110 over Tobruk on 14 April.

As the Allies continued to retreat, No. 3 Squadron re-located to Lydda in Palestine and began converting from Hurricanes to P-40 Tomahawks on 14 May 1941. Arthur was among a detachment of six pilots deployed to Cyprus to patrol the coast of Turkey in Hurricanes from 25 May to 3 June. The squadron took part in the Syria–Lebanon campaign against the Vichy French in June–July. Arthur was rested from operations and posted as an instructor to No. 71 Operational Training Unit RAF in the Sudan on 14 August. No. 3 Squadron returned to Sidi Haneish on 3 September, to resume operations in the Western Desert. Arthur re-joined the squadron on 18 September. On 1 October, he was promoted to flight lieutenant and appointed a flight commander. Flying a Tomahawk, he was credited with one Messerschmitt Bf 109 fighter probably destroyed, and another damaged, in the vicinity of Sheferzen, Egypt, on 12 October.

I think you'd have to be bloody stupid if you were not afraid. Of course, the situation is that you're so busy in combat that [...] you get involved in what's happening and that's – that occupies the mind wonderfully...

— Wilf Arthur on aerial combat, 1989

On the afternoon of 22 November 1941, during Operation Crusader, No. 3 Squadron was operating with No. 112 Squadron RAF when the Allied aircraft encountered twenty Messerschmitts south-east of El Adem. In a drawn-out battle for air superiority, during which No. 3 Squadron lost six Tomahawks against three Bf 109s destroyed, Arthur claimed four Bf 109s damaged. He became an ace on 30 November, when he achieved four victories in a single sortie. The action occurred when Nos. 3 and 112 Squadrons intercepted fifteen Junkers Ju 87 Stuka dive bombers escorted by twenty-five German and Italian fighters heading to attack New Zealand troops at Sidi Rezegh; No. 3 Squadron claimed eight aircraft destroyed and twelve damaged, bringing its tally of claims in the theatre to 106 aircraft destroyed. Arthur was credited with shooting down two Ju 87s and two Italian fighters, a Fiat G.50 and a Macchi MC.200. He destroyed the last of the four after his plane had been damaged and he was on his way back to base; he crash-landed within the Tobruk perimeter and borrowed a Hurricane to return to his squadron. His "great skill and gallantry" in this action earned him the Distinguished Flying Cross (DFC), which was gazetted on 20 January 1942.

Arthur met his future wife, Lucille (Lucie) Petraki, a Greek–Egyptian national, in a shop in Alexandria. They married in an Anglican ceremony at St Mark's Church in Alexandria on 24 December 1941, and honeymooned in Palestine and Syria. The sudden romance came as a shock to Arthur's parents; he related that "the first letter I got was a fair imitation of panic I think". While on leave, he was also able to make contact with his brother Norman, who was stationed with the Australian Army in Beirut. Arthur was mentioned in despatches on 1 January 1942. Completing his tour with No. 3 Squadron, he embarked for Australia on 20 January. He managed to arrange for his new bride to travel with him on the troopship. Arthur recalled that they sailed via Bombay and Colombo, where the ship picked up many refugees following the recent fall of Singapore, before arriving in Melbourne on 28 March. The couple eventually had four children.

=== South-West Pacific ===
As the Japanese advanced in the South West Pacific during early 1942, the RAAF hurriedly established three new fighter units for the defence of Australia and New Guinea, Nos. 75, 76 and 77 Squadrons. On 13 April, Arthur was posted to No. 76 Squadron in Townsville, Queensland, flying P-40 Kittyhawks. Ten days later he was transferred to No. 2 Operational Training Unit (OTU) at Mildura, Victoria, as an instructor. Other instructors at the school included desert aces Clive Caldwell and Alan Rawlinson. In June, Arthur, Rawlinson and a United States Army Air Forces (USAAF) pilot conducted comparative trials pitting the new CAC Boomerang against a Kittyhawk and a Bell Airacobra, reporting favourably on the Boomerang's handling characteristics. Arthur was promoted to squadron leader on 1 October. His brother Norman was killed in action on 9 November while serving with the 2/31st Infantry Battalion on the Kokoda Trail.

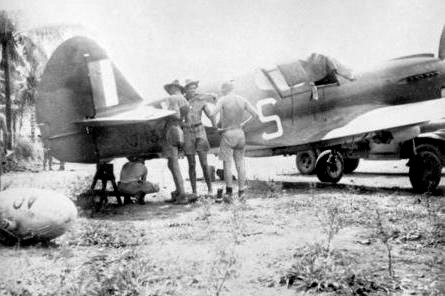
P-40 Kittyhawk "Polly", flown by Squadron Leader Arthur when he earned the DSO in April 1943

On 22 January 1943, Arthur succeeded Les Jackson as commanding officer of No. 75 Squadron, a Kittyhawk unit based at Milne Bay in New Guinea under the control of No. 9 Operational Group. Arthur developed a reputation for diligence, courtesy, and concern for the welfare of his men. Despite being, at twenty-three, the youngest officer in his new squadron, he commanded the respect of his fellows because, he believed, "they like that I work hard; they like that I am not frightened of anything (i.e. Pretends not to be) and above those, they like that I don't boast". On 10 March, Arthur was credited with the destruction of a Mitsubishi G4M "Betty" that he attacked while flying with another Kittyhawk near Fergusson Island. Battling stoppages in his guns, Arthur reported chasing the bomber 80 miles (130 km) before bringing it down.

Arthur was awarded the Distinguished Service Order (DSO) for his "gallantry, matchless leadership and devotion to duty" in action over Milne Bay on 14 April 1943. On this occasion, his guns jammed completely and he could not clear them. In spite of this, he led thirty-four Allied aircraft, including Kittyhawks of Nos. 75 and 77 Squadrons and P-38 Lightnings of the USAAF, in what his DSO citation described as "a determined head-on attack" to intercept 100 Japanese raiders, fourteen of which the defenders claimed as destroyed. Arthur described the situation of being in combat but unable to shoot as "sort of awkward. Fortunately nobody else would know except me." To compensate for his lack of offensive weaponry, he repeatedly made as though attempting to ram one of the Japanese aircraft, to try and force it down into the sea. His DSO was gazetted on 25 May.

On 13 June 1943, Arthur was promoted acting wing commander and the next day became wing leader of No. 71 Wing, which controlled No. 75 Squadron and three other combat units. He was credited with probably destroying a Betty over Jacquinot Bay in New Britain on 31 October. Five days later, he was involved in a runway collision at Kiriwina Airfield with a Supermarine Spitfire of No. 79 Squadron. The Spitfire pilot was killed, and Arthur received serious burns. He recalled, "I felt my hands disappear, felt my face go but the rest of my body was ... was just flames [...] And then all of a sudden the flames dropped down a bit and I got out and went like mad and I was running away from the aircraft and trying to guess how far I could go before I'd try to put the flames out..." Although his family was informed that his injuries were "of a very slight nature" and that he had been "burnt but not badly", Arthur was temporarily blinded and close to death for weeks while he was treated in Kiriwina. He was subsequently repatriated aboard a Bristol Beaufighter to Sydney, where he underwent plastic surgery.

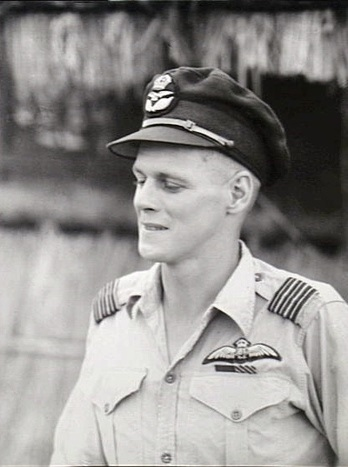
Wing Commander Arthur as wing leader of No. 71 Wing on Goodenough Island, July 1943

Arthur was mentioned in despatches on 29 March 1944 for his "distinguished service" in the South West Pacific. The award was gazetted on 16 June. Having recovered from his injuries, he commenced No. 3 War Staff Course at the RAAF Staff School on 3 April, and took charge of No. 2 OTU on 3 August. He was promoted to acting group captain on 5 October. Aged twenty-four, he was the youngest group captain in the RAAF. On 16 December, Arthur assumed command of No. 81 Wing, headquartered at Noemfoor in the Dutch East Indies. Comprising three squadrons, the wing came under the control of the Australian First Tactical Air Force (No. 1 TAF), the RAAF's mobile strike force. By this time, No. 1 TAF was mainly assigned to garrison duties and harassing Japanese bases on islands bypassed by US forces advancing on the Philippines and Japan.

Flying his first mission on 22 December 1944, Arthur began to doubt the value of some targets considering the risk his pilots faced from ground fire, and cancelled three days of operations on his own authority. He also formulated a "balance sheet" of achievements as opposed to losses in October–November, finding that the wing had destroyed a dozen Japanese barges and six vehicles for the loss of eleven pilots and fifteen aircraft. According to historian Mark Johnston, "His letters at this time reveal a thoughtful and perhaps restless man, grappling with political and religious issues." Arthur presented the balance sheet to the commander of No. 1 TAF, Air Commodore Harry Cobby, who reviewed it and disseminated it to his headquarters staff, but took no further action. Frustrated, Arthur began discussing his concerns with other senior pilots of No. 1 TAF, including Group Captain Caldwell and Wing Commander Bobby Gibbes of No. 80 Wing, and Squadron Leader John Waddy of No. 80 Squadron, all fellow veterans of the North African campaign.

On 6 April 1945, Arthur took command of No. 1 TAF's No. 78 Wing, headquartered on Morotai. There he played a prominent role in an incident that became known as the "Morotai Mutiny" (a phrase originating in one of his aide memoires at the time). By this time Arthur, Caldwell, Gibbes, Waddy, and four other officers of No. 1 TAF who had become disillusioned with the way the war was being conducted had formed a group and began determining action to take. On 20 April, Arthur and the other seven officers attempted to resign their commissions to protest what they considered to be militarily unjustifiable operations. Arthur later said that his object for the "mutiny" was to "make as big a fuss as I possibly could with the object of getting the position corrected". In the end, Cobby and his senior headquarters staff were dismissed from their positions, and most of the "mutineers" continued on operations. A government inquiry into the incident exonerated the officers, finding their motives in tendering their resignations to be sincere. Retaining command of No. 78 Wing, Arthur was appointed air task force commander for the Battle of Tarakan, which commenced on 1 May. No. 81 Wing was originally slated for the operation but at the last minute No. 78 Wing, expanded from three squadrons to four, was substituted and given only ten days to prepare for deployment. Arthur handed over command of No. 78 Wing to Group Captain Alan Rawlinson on 24 May.

Arthur's official final tally of aerial victories during the war was ten enemy aircraft destroyed, though his score has also been reported as eight destroyed and two probables, as well as six damaged. Reflecting on being a fighter pilot throughout his military career, Arthur said that he was glad to have flown single-seat aircraft rather than bombers, because "I would always have felt very uncomfortable with anybody else for whom I'd be responsible".

== Later life and legacy ==
I knew I'd wreck any air force career [...] but I couldn't face up to people getting killed when there was no bloody reason to.

— Wilf Arthur on his part in the "Morotai Mutiny", 1989

Arthur was discharged from the Air Force on 14 February 1946, and commissioned the following day as a temporary wing commander in the RAAF Reserve. In May, he became registrar of the Koornong Free Expression School in the Melbourne suburb of Warrandyte. Subsequently working for the Repatriation Department, in 1950 he joined the Australian School of Pacific Administration, and in 1961 travelled to Vietnam to establish a dairy farm at Bến Cát under the Colombo Plan. He was captured by the Viet Cong later that year and was not released until a ransom was paid—medical and other non-military items according to one newspaper, an Olivetti typewriter according to another. Arthur was reported as saying that he was subjected to long hours of political discourse by his captors, but no physical harm or threats of harm. He continued to work in Vietnam after this incident, and by 1966 was running a business supplying duck feathers to the American military for use in life jackets. A son, Haig, served in the Vietnam War with the Royal Australian Army Service Corps. Returning to Australia, Arthur took up residence in Darwin, Northern Territory, in 1967 and became administration manager for Geopeko, the exploration unit responsible for discovering the Ranger uranium deposit at Jabiru. He died in Darwin on 23 December 2000, and was interred in the Adelaide River War Cemetery.

The Kittyhawk "Polly" that Arthur flew in his DSO-winning action of 14 April 1943 was purchased by the Australian War Memorial, Canberra, in 1992 and put on display in its Aircraft Hall. In 2011, the Scots College at Warwick opened the Wilf Arthur Learning Enrichment Centre, which featured a scale model of "Polly".
