= No. 80 Wing RAAF =

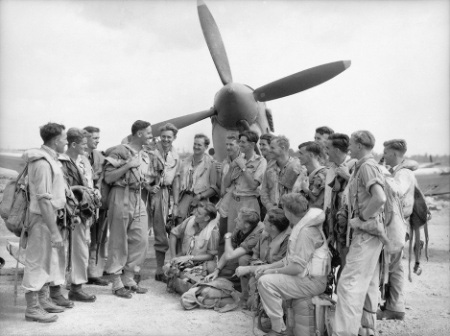
- Group Captain Caldwell (fourth from left) talking to No. 452 Squadron Spitfire pilots at Morotai in January 1945
- Active: 1944–1945
- Country: Australia
- Branch: Royal Australian Air Force
- Role: Fighter
- Size: Three flying squadrons
- Part of: Australian First Tactical Air Force
- Engagements: World War II: Borneo Campaign (1945)

Commanders
- Notable commanders: Clive Caldwell; Glen Cooper

Aircraft flown
- Fighter: Spitfire

No. 80 Wing was a Royal Australian Air Force (RAAF) wing of World War II. The unit was formed on 15 May 1944 and eventually comprised three squadrons equipped with Spitfire fighter aircraft. The wing's headquarters was absorbed into the newly formed No. 11 Group on 30 July 1945.

The wing was established to provide fighter protection for an Allied offensive from Darwin in northern Australia into the eastern Netherlands East Indies (NEI). This operation was effectively cancelled in June 1944, however, leaving No. 80 Wing without a clear mission. The unit remained at Darwin until it moved to Morotai in the NEI between December 1944 and March 1945. Due to the small number of Japanese aircraft remaining in this area the Wing's aircraft were mainly used in the ground attack role. From May 1945 to the end of the war two of No. 80 Wing's squadrons participated in the Borneo Campaign.

== History ==
=== Darwin ===
In early 1944 General George Kenney, the commander of the Allied air forces in the South West Pacific Area (SWPA), adopted a goal of landing forces at Selaru Island in the eastern NEI and establishing a bomber base there. Accordingly, in early March, Air Vice Marshal William Bostock, who led RAAF Command, presented Kenney with a proposal for the RAAF to contribute two fighter wings and several ancillary units to this operation, which at the time was scheduled for 15 June. One of these wings would be equipped with P-40 Kittyhawks and the other with Spitfires. In March Group Captain Clive Caldwell, the RAAF's highest-scoring flying ace of the war, reluctantly accepted command of the projected Spitfire wing after his request for a transfer to Europe was rejected by Chief of the Air Staff Air Vice Marshal George Jones. Jones told Caldwell during a meeting that the wing would have the highest priority for supplies and equipment.

No. 80 Wing was formed at Darwin, Northern Territory on 15 May 1944. It initially comprised No. 452 and No. 457 Squadrons, which were transferred from No. 1 Wing. Both of these squadrons had seen extensive combat over Europe and northern Australia and were based at Sattler Airfield near Darwin. The squadrons were equipped with Spitfire Vc aircraft at the time of the wing's establishment, but received superior Mark VIII Spitfires between June and August.

General Douglas MacArthur, the commander of Allied forces in the SWPA, decided on 6 June to postpone the Selaru operation until after Allied forces landed in the Philippines. This was not communicated to No. 80 Wing, however, and Caldwell continued to develop plans for its involvement in the Selaru operation until late August. The effective cancellation of the operation left No. 80 Wing without a clear mission, and its pilots were left with nothing to do other than train. In September Air Commodore Alan Charlesworth, the commander of North-Western Area, reported to Bostock that the wing's morale could drop if it was not either given an active role or transferred to southern Australia. During the same period No. 80 Wing's pilots observed that No. 1 Wing's Spitfires were making occasional strafing attacks on Japanese positions in the NEI and sought approval to conduct similar operations. Caldwell did not agree to this, however, as be believed that the risks associated with flying Spitfires to the edge of their range to attack unimportant targets outweighed any benefits to morale.

=== Morotai ===
In mid-September Bostock gained the agreement of Kenney's headquarters to deploy No. 80 Wing to the recently captured island of Morotai in the NEI as part of a redeployment of RAAF units in the SWPA. While this raised morale within No. 80 Wing, it had only a short time to prepare to move overseas. On 8 November Caldwell received orders to begin the movement to Morotai as soon as possible, and he visited the island late that month. During this visit he observed that it was likely that supply shortages would impede the wing's operations. No. 80 Wing's headquarters left Darwin on 9 December and No. 452 Squadron departed on 15 December. During the squadron's trip to Morotai that day, three Spitfires were destroyed or damaged as a result of landing accidents at Merauke, New Guinea. As expected, living facilities at Morotai were initially very basic, and Caldwell traded liquor for the services of US engineer units to improve the wing's camp site.

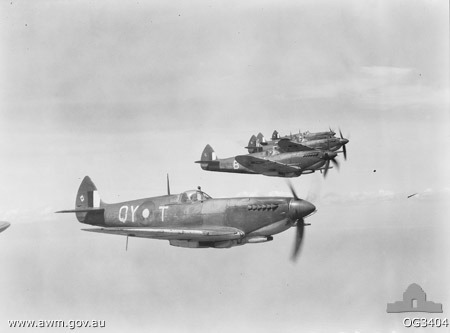
Five No. 452 Squadron Spitfires in flight near Morotai during December 1944

The wing began flying night defence patrols shortly after No. 452 Squadron arrived at Morotai. At the time Morotai was a major Allied base and had been attacked by Japanese aircraft on multiple occasions. During the night of 24 December a Spitfire shot down a Japanese bomber over the island. This proved to be one of the last Japanese raids on Morotai, and no further interceptions were made. The lack of aerial opposition meant that No. 80 Wing's aircraft were increasingly used to strafe Japanese positions near Morotai. During January 1945 the wing flew 84 ground attack sorties, losing three Spitfires in the process. The lack of opportunities for aerial combat disappointed No. 80 Wing's pilots and contributed to a decline in their morale.

No. 80 Wing completed its move to Morotai in March. No. 457 Squadron's Spitfires left Darwin on 6 February and arrived on the island two days later. Later that month No. 79 Squadron joined the wing at Morotai. This squadron had previously operated Spitfires in New Guinea and nearby islands before withdrawing to Darwin in January 1945 to receive Mark VIII Spitfires. The final ship carrying No. 80 Wing personnel and equipment from Darwin arrived at Morotai in early March. Wing Commander Bobby Gibbes, who had been appointed No. 80 Wing's wing leader in October 1944, held temporary command of the unit for several days in late March while Caldwell made a trip to Manila. On 31 March Wing Commander Glen Cooper assumed command from Caldwell, who had reached the end of his appointment and was disillusioned with how No. 80 Wing had been used.

Dissatisfaction with the tasks being undertaken by the First Tactical Air Force (1TAF), of which No. 80 Wing was part, led to the "Morotai Mutiny" in April 1945. On 19 April, Caldwell, Gibbes and six other senior 1TAF officers attempted to resign in protest against what they believed was the misuse of fighter aircraft in ground attack operations against isolated Japanese positions. While no action was taken against these officers, Caldwell and Gibbes were later court martialled for selling liquor.

From May No. 80 Wing units participated in the Australian-led Borneo Campaign. No. 457 Squadron was attached to No. 81 Wing and deployed to Labuan on 18 June as part of the Operation Oboe Six landings in the Brunei Bay region. The squadron provided air defence and flew close air support sorties alongside No. 76 Squadron, and shot down a Japanese aircraft on 20 June. In April No. 452 Squadron was attached to No. 78 Wing and took part in the landing at Tarakan in May. Delays in repairing Tarakan's airfield meant that it did not see any combat until 30 June. The squadron subsequently supported the landing at Balikpapan in July, and one of its Spitfires shot down a Japanese aircraft in the early hours of 24 July. During this period No. 79 Squadron remained at Morotai and continued to fly ground attack sorties against Japanese positions on the nearby island of Halmahera. On 30 July 1945 No. 80 Wing Headquarters was absorbed into the newly formed No. 11 Group. While it was intended that the wing's three flying squadrons would come under the command of this group, in the event it only took operational control of No. 79 Squadron before the war ended.

A memorial plaque for No. 80 Wing was unveiled at the Australian War Memorial on 29 November 2013.
