= Glen Cooper =

Australian military officer (1915–1986)

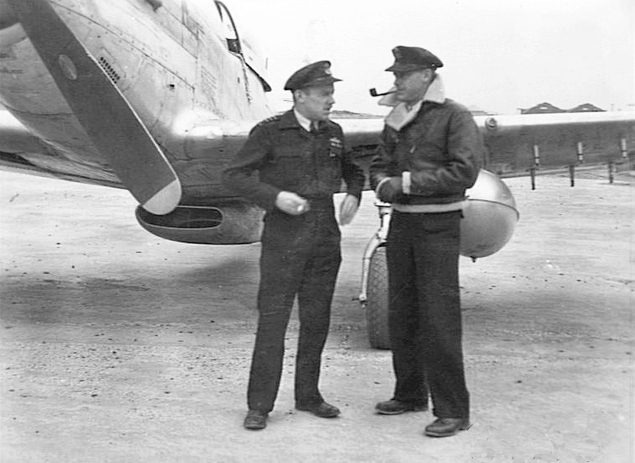
- Wing Commander Cooper (left) after landing the first of No. 81 Wing's P-51 Mustangs to arrive at Iwakuni, Japan, in 1946
- Born: 20 November 1915; Glenferrie, Melbourne
- Died: 6 April 1986 (aged 70); East Melbourne
- Military career
- Allegiance: Australia
- Branch: Royal Australian Air Force
- Service years: 1934–70
- Rank: Air Commodore
- Service number: 251426
- Commands: No. 80 Squadron; No. 80 Wing; No. 81 Wing; No. 1 Flying Training School; No. 21 Squadron; North-Western Area Command; No. 78 Wing; RAAF Base Williamtown
- Conflicts: Second World War; South West Pacific theatre; Malayan Emergency
- Awards: Commander of the Order of the British Empire; Distinguished Flying Cross; Air Force Cross

Air Commodore Glen Albert Cooper, CBE, DFC, AFC (20 November 1915 – 6 April 1986) was an officer in the Royal Australian Air Force (RAAF). During the Second World War, he commanded No. 80 Squadron in the New Guinea campaign (for which he was awarded the Distinguished Flying Cross) and then No. 80 Wing in the Borneo campaign. He commanded No. 78 Wing during the Malayan Emergency, earning the Air Force Cross for his leadership. Following his retirement from the RAAF in 1970, he was appointed a Commander of the Order of the British Empire.

== Early life ==
Born on 20 November 1915 in Glenferrie, Melbourne, Cooper was the son of a butcher and was educated at state schools in Melbourne. After finishing his education at Melbourne High School, he entered the workforce as a manchester salesman.

== Military career ==
At the age of 19, Cooper enlisted in the Royal Australian Air Force (RAAF). Initially he was an aircraft hand, and then a clerk and bandsman (having learned the trumpet in his childhood). Still an enlisted man, he began flight training in 1936. He graduated as a sergeant upon completion of his training in December and was initially posted to No. 1 Squadron. By mid 1937, he was a flight instructor at No. 1 Flying Training School. He was commissioned in June 1939 but two months later resigned from the air force. Having recently become married to Doreen May Freeland, he and his new wife moved to Adelaide, where he took up an instructor position at an aero club.

=== Second World War ===
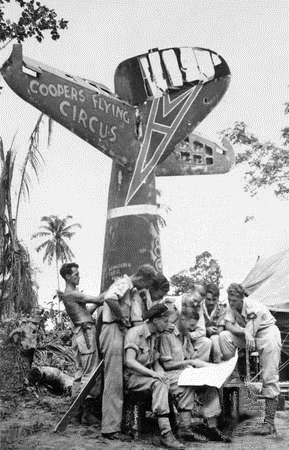
"Coopers Flying Circus": Squadron Leader Cooper (middle) with members of No. 80 Squadron in New Guinea, July 1944

In 1940 Cooper was recalled from the Citizen Air Force (the RAAF reserve) and promoted to flying officer. Engaged in instructor duties throughout 1941, in July 1942 he undertook fighter pilot training and was posted in quick succession to No. 23, 83 and 86 squadrons to gain operational experience. In September 1943, he took command of No. 80 Squadron, which was then operating Kittyhawks. The squadron supported units of the Australian Army during the New Guinea Campaign, and Cooper, having been made temporary squadron leader on being put in command of the squadron, was awarded the Distinguished Flying Cross in 1944.

In July 1944, Cooper returned to Australia and once again took up instructor duties, this time at No. 2 Operational Training Unit. In January 1945, he was temporarily promoted to wing commander and tasked to take over No. 80 Wing, then based in Morotai (an island in the Dutch East Indies), from Group Captain Clive Caldwell. No. 80 Wing, operating Spitfires, was then training for the forthcoming invasion of Borneo, and once the invasion began, supported the Borneo campaign. Cooper remained in command of No. 80 Wing until the end of the war. In September 1945, Cooper was put in command of No. 81 Wing, which was tasked with occupation duties in Japan. He returned to Australia in 1947, having been promoted to acting group captain at the time of taking over No. 81 Wing.

=== Postwar career ===
Granted a permanent commission as an acting wing commander in September 1948, Cooper held several postwar commands, including No. 1 Flying Training School from 1949 to 1950, No. 21 Squadron from 1950 to 1952, and North-Western Area Command from 1952 to 1954. Raised to group captain in 1957, he was commander of No. 78 Wing from 1957 to 1960. No. 78 Wing was then operating Sabres from RAAF Butterworth Base in Malaya during the Malayan Emergency, and Cooper was awarded the Air Force Cross for his leadership. He also undertook diplomatic duties, serving as air attaché in Paris from 1963 to 1966, and helped with the integration of the Mirage fighter jet into Australian service. Promoted to acting air commodore in 1966 (made permanent in 1968), Cooper retired from the Royal Australian Air Force in 1970 having spent his final years as commander of RAAF Base Williamtown.

== Later life ==
Cooper was appointed a Commander of the Order of the British Empire shortly after his retirement and died of cancer on 6 April 1986. He was survived by his wife and two children.
