= Bir Dufan Airfield =

Bir Dufan Airfield
- 9 kilometers north of Bir Dufan in Libya
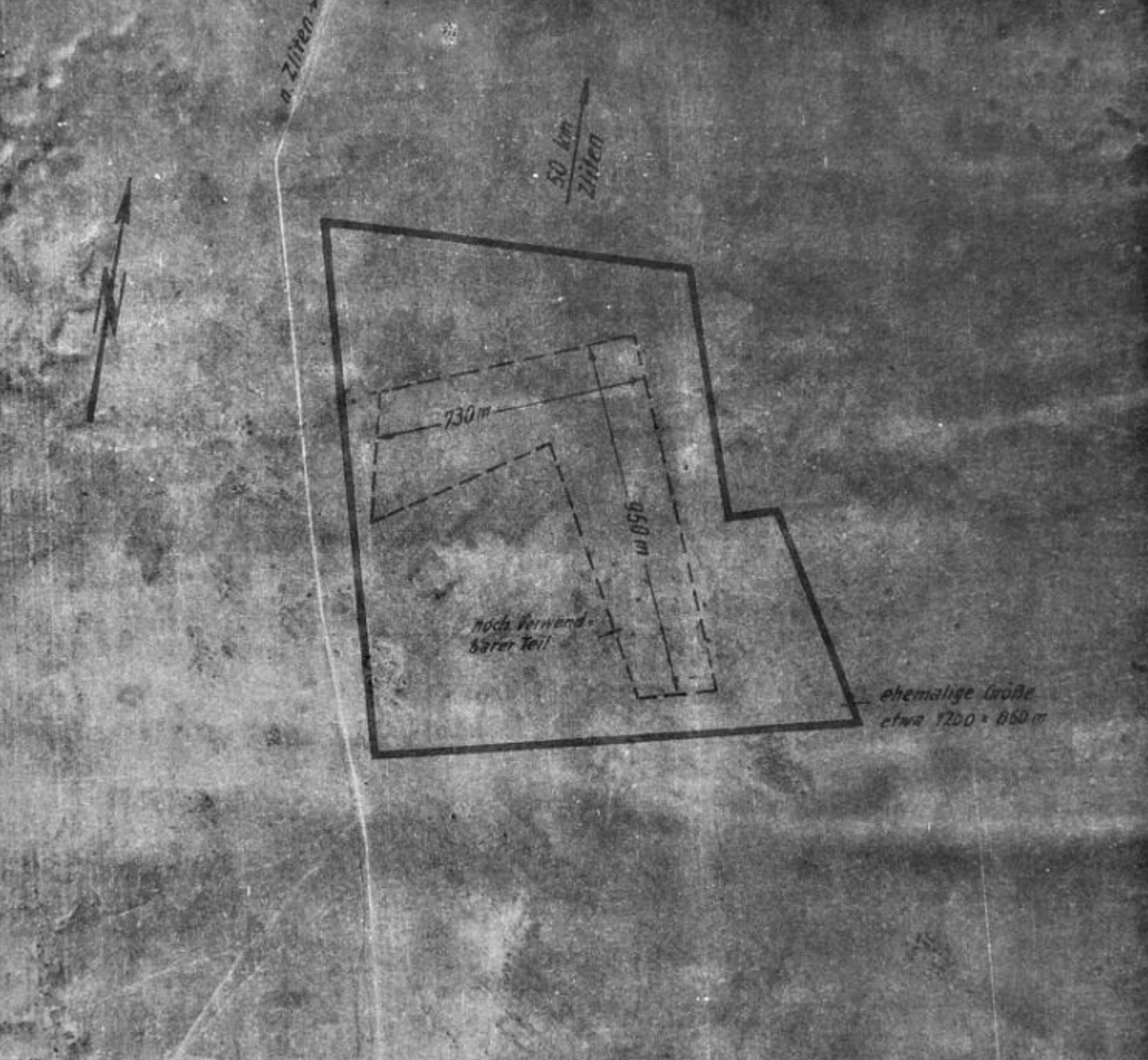
- Aerial photograph of Bir Dufan II Airfield taken on 20 January 1943.

Site information
- Type: Military airfield
- Operator: Luftwaffe; Regia Aeronautica
- Condition: Abandoned

Location
- Shown within Libya
- Coordinates: 32°03′30″N 14°35′00″E

Site history
- In use: February 1941 - January 1943
- Battles/wars: North African Campaign

Garrison information
- Garrison: Luftwaffen-Hauptkommandantur E 39/IV (Airfield Command)

Bir Dufan Airfield was a World War II airfield located 9 kilometers north of the small village of Bir Dufan in northwestern Libya. During the North African Campaign, it was primarily used as a temporary forward base by the Regia Aeronautica and the Luftwaffe from February 1941 until January 1943, when it was abandoned.

== History ==
History of Bir Dufan Airfield prior to February 1941 is unknown. The airfield was located in a remote area, positioned 9 km north of the small village of Bir Dufan, which is approximately 56 km south of Zliten and 65 km southwest of Misurata. Bir Dufan I Airfield was located at 32°03′30″N 14°35′00″E, while Bir Dufan II Airfield was located at 32°01′50″N 14°34′10″E.

In February 1941, Regia Aeronautica and Luftwaffe units began operating from Bir Dufan Airfield for the first time. The airfield was upgraded to have six natural Sandy surface airstrips, all of which measuring approximately 1645 m long and 185 m wide, 1370 m long and 320 m wide, 870 m long and 685 m wide, 885 m long and 440 m wide, 825 m long and 705 m wide, and finally 1370 m long and 550 w wide. Fuel for aircraft was stored in barrels, while a nearby fort was utilized as accommodations for personnel. The airfield was equipped with 3 splinter protection shelters on the southern side, and corner and side markers were used to identify the landing ground. By January 1942, the airfield was equipped with protection by 4 light Flak gun positions.

=== Operations ===
From 1941 until early 1942, Bir Dufan Airfield was used as an Italian forward bomber and attack base supporting Axis offensives in Tripolitania. From late December 1942 until the first half of January 1943, Bir Dufan Airfield was heavily used by the Luftwaffe, operating as a fighter, ground-attack, and reconnaissance base, supporting Fliegerführer Afrika operations during the Axis retreat. By January 1943, Bir Dufan Airfield operated as a forward landing ground, and the Luftwaffe began launching a full-scale effort to protect the airfield using recently repaired aircraft flown by newly arrived pilots. On 14 January 1943, the airfield was bombed, lightly damaging one stationary Bf 109 G-2 belonging to the 3./JG 77. During the attack, more than 20 Messerschmitt Bf 109s led by Major Joachim Müncheberg intercepted the formation of 18 Douglas A-20 Havocs, which was escorted by the 48 total Kittyhawk fighters from No. 3 Squadron RAAF, No. 250 Squadron RAAF, No. 260 Squadron RAAF, and No. 450 Squadron RAAF. It resulted in 6 Allied aircraft losses, including an aircraft flown by CO Squadron Leader Bobby Gibbes.

=== Abandonment ===
Following use by the Luftwaffe, the six airstrips were destroyed by plowing and mining from 15 to 17 January 1943. A Junkers Ju 88 A-4 belonging to Erprobungstaffel/KG 30 was also destroyed to present capture, and Bir Dufan Airfield was abandoned after that. On the morning of 17 January 1943, Allied bomber-fighter forces concentrated their attacks on Bir Dufan Airfield and transports in the vicinity, however, the attacks were shifted to enemy vehicles in the Beni Uhd area as the airfield was already vacated by then.

== Units ==
The following lists the units that were based at Bir Dufan Airfield:

Regia Aeronautica (Italian)

- 54° Gruppo BT, Mar 1941
- 96° Gruppo BaT, Feb 1941 – Apr 1941
- 98° Gruppo BT, Mar 1941 – Apr 1941
- 43° Gruppo BT, Jan 1942 – Feb 1942
- 11° Gruppo BT, Mar 1942 – Apr 1942
- 86° Gruppo BM, Nov 1942
- 95° Gruppo BM, Nov 1942

Luftwaffe (German)

- 8. Staffel / Zerstörergeschwader 26 (Destroyer Wing 26), Feb 1941 – Mar 1941
- Liaison Squadron / Fliegerführer Afrika (Air Commander Africa), Dec 1942
- 1. (Fernaufklärung) Staffel / Aufklärungsgruppe 121 (Long-Range Reconnaissance Group 121), Dec 1942
- III. Gruppe of Sturzkampfgeschwader 3 (Dive Bomber Wing 3), Dec 1942 – Jan 1943
- Staff Headquarters of Jagdgeschwader 77 (Fighter Wing 77), Dec 1942 – Jan 1943
- I. Gruppe of Jagdgeschwader 77 (Fighter Wing 77), Dec 1942 – Jan 1943
- III. Gruppe of Jagdgeschwader 77 (Fighter Wing 77), Dec 1942 – Jan 1943
- II. Gruppe of Jagdgeschwader 77 (Fighter Wing 77), Jan 1943
- 1st Desert Emergency Squadron (Wüstennotstaffel), Jan 1943
- 4. (Heeresaufklärung) Staffel / Aufklärungsgruppe 12 (Army Cooperation Reconnaissance Group 12), Jan 1943
- I. Gruppe of Schlachtgeschwader 2 (Ground-Attack Wing 2), Jan 1943

Station Command (German)

- Luftwaffen-Hauptkommandantur E 39/IV (Airfield Command), Dec 1942 – Jan 1943

Station Units (German)

- Elements of leichte Flak-Abteilung 841 (motorisiert) (Light Anti-Aircraft Battalion), Dec 1942 – Jan 1943
