= Bobby Gibbes =

Royal Australian Air Force fighter pilot

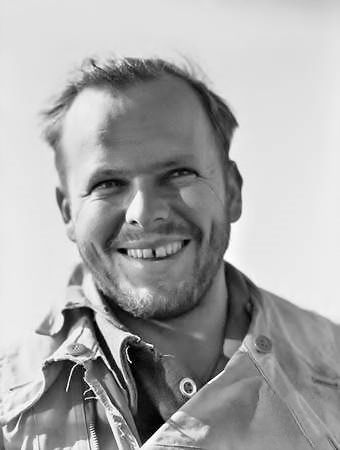
- Bobby Gibbes, North Africa, c. January 1942
- Born: Robert Henry Maxwell Gibbes; 6 May 1916; Young, New South Wales
- Died: 11 April 2007 (aged 90); Sydney, New South Wales
- Military career
- Allegiance: Australia
- Branch: Royal Australian Air Force
- Service years: 1940–1946; 1952–1957
- Rank: Wing Commander
- Units: No. 23 Squadron (1940); No. 450 Squadron (1941); No. 2 OTU (1944); No. 80 Wing (1944–1945)
- Commands: No. 3 Squadron (1942–1943)
- Conflicts: World War II; Middle Eastern theatre; Syria–Lebanon campaign; Western Desert campaign; South West Pacific theatre
- Awards: Distinguished Service Order; Distinguished Flying Cross and Bar; Medal of the Order of Australia
- Other work: Businessman

Robert Henry Maxwell Gibbes, DSO, DFC & Bar, OAM (6 May 1916 – 11 April 2007) was an Australian fighter ace of World War II, and the longest-serving wartime commanding officer of No. 3 Squadron RAAF. He was officially credited with 10¼ aerial victories, although his score is often reported as 12, including two shared; Gibbes was also credited with five aircraft probably destroyed, and a further 16 damaged. He commanded No. 3 Squadron in North Africa from February 1942 to April 1943, apart from a brief period when he was wounded.

Born in rural New South Wales, Gibbes worked as a jackaroo and salesman before joining the Royal Australian Air Force in February 1940. Posted to the Middle East in April 1941, he flew with No. 3 Squadron in the Syria–Lebanon Campaign, and became commanding officer during the Western Desert Campaign, where his leadership and fighting skills earned him the Distinguished Service Order and the Distinguished Flying Cross and Bar. Subsequently, posted to the South West Pacific, he served with No. 80 Wing of the Australian First Tactical Air Force, and took part in the "Morotai Mutiny" of April 1945. After the war, he spent many years in New Guinea developing local industry, for which he was awarded the Medal of the Order of Australia in 2004. He continued to fly until the age of 85.

== Family and early career ==
The only son of Henry and Cora Gibbes, Robert Henry Maxwell (Bobby) Gibbes was born on 6 May 1916 in Young, New South Wales. His family had long been active in the government and military. His great-grandfather, Colonel John George Nathaniel Gibbes, built his residence "Wotonga" at Kirribilli; the property was later refurbished to become Sydney's Admiralty House. Gibbes' grandfather, Augustus Onslow Manby Gibbes, owned Yarralumla station, subsequently the official residence of Australia's Governor-General. His father was a grazier and his uncle Fred a Sopwith Camel pilot in World War I who was killed in action. Gibbes attended All Saints College in Bathurst, and schools in Manly, before earning a living as a jackaroo.

Gibbes was working as a salesman when he joined the Royal Australian Air Force (RAAF) on 2 February 1940. He exaggerated his height, which was below the minimum requirement, to gain entrance. In a 1990 interview, he related that he had undertaken flying lessons at his own expense before enlisting, but "when war was declared, I thought I'd wait for King George to pay for the rest". He further recalled that he applied to join the Royal Australian Navy at the same time, but was still waiting for a response. After completing flying training at Mascot and Richmond, New South Wales, and Point Cook, Victoria, Gibbes was commissioned a pilot officer on 28 June 1940. His initial posting was to No. 23 Squadron, which operated CAC Wirraways and Lockheed Hudsons out of Archerfield, Queensland. He was promoted to flying officer on 26 December 1940.

Two of Gibbes' cousins—both born in 1915 and, like Bobby, only sons—were also pilots in the RAAF. Rodney Gibbes joined the Air Force in July 1936. Peter Gibbes, an airline pilot before the war, enlisted in December 1940. Each earned the Distinguished Flying Cross, Rodney in 1940 for his part in a Wellington bomber raid in Europe while serving with the Royal Air Force, and Peter in 1942 for his actions flying a Hudson bomber with No. 1 Squadron RAAF during the Malayan Campaign. Rodney died in action over Italy on 16 May 1943.

== Combat service ==
=== Middle East ===
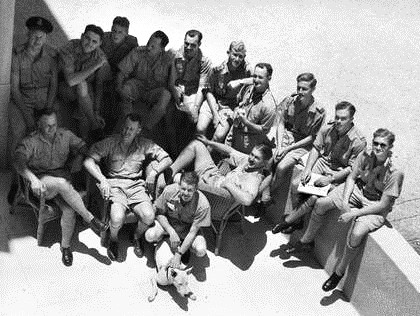
Gibbes (front, left) with fellow pilots in the Middle East including John Jackson (back, left), June 1941; the next month, the two men shared an aerial victory whose credit went to Gibbes on the toss of a coin.

In April 1941, Gibbes was posted to the Middle East as adjutant of No. 450 Squadron. The following month he transferred to No. 3 Squadron, which was flying Hawker Hurricanes. In June, after converting to P-40 Tomahawks, the squadron commenced operations in the Syria–Lebanon Campaign. Gibbes was credited with a probable victory over a Junkers Ju 88 near Beirut on 13 June. On 11 July he claimed his first "kill", a Dewoitine D.520 fighter of the Vichy French air force, over Aleppo. He shared in its destruction with John Jackson, after which the pair tossed a coin to take full credit for it, and Gibbes won. In September, No. 3 Squadron transferred to the Western Desert Campaign, where it saw action against German and Italian forces. On 20 November, during Operation Crusader, Gibbes took part in the destruction of a Messerschmitt Bf 110 with three other pilots, crash landing back at base with damage to his own aircraft. On 25 November he shot down two Fiat G.50s and damaged three more, as well as a Messerschmitt Bf 109. Five days later he destroyed a G.50 over Tobruk. On 22 January 1942, he brought down a Junkers Ju 87 and damaged two G.50s. He was promoted to acting flight lieutenant the same month.

Raised to acting squadron leader, Gibbes was appointed commanding officer of No. 3 Squadron on 26 February 1942. The unit's Tomahawks had by this time been replaced by Kittyhawks, and Gibbes emblazoned his with a cartoon depicting a kangaroo kicking a dachshund in the rear. He claimed a Bf 109 (possibly a misidentified Macchi C.202) during the siege of Tobruk on 7 May. On 26 May, he was shot down while leading an attack on a heavily escorted force of Luftwaffe bombers near El Adem. After firing at and probably destroying a Bf 109, Gibbes was hit by fire from a Ju 88 and had to bail out. Part of his parachute became entangled with the tailplane of his stricken aircraft and he struggled to escape. He broke his ankle in the landing but within six weeks was flying again, his leg still in a cast. Due to his enforced absence, fellow ace Nicky Barr was given command of No. 3 Squadron until he himself was shot down and taken prisoner on 26 June, at which point Gibbes again took charge of the unit. Barr later said that although Gibbes was not a brilliant shot, he had the keenest eyesight of any pilot he knew when it came to locating enemy aircraft and alerting his fellows for the attack. Another No. 3 Squadron pilot, Tom Russell, agreed that Gibbes was particularly adept at finding targets, and said that "if we got scattered in a dogfight he had the uncanny ability to get us back into formation in a very short space of time".

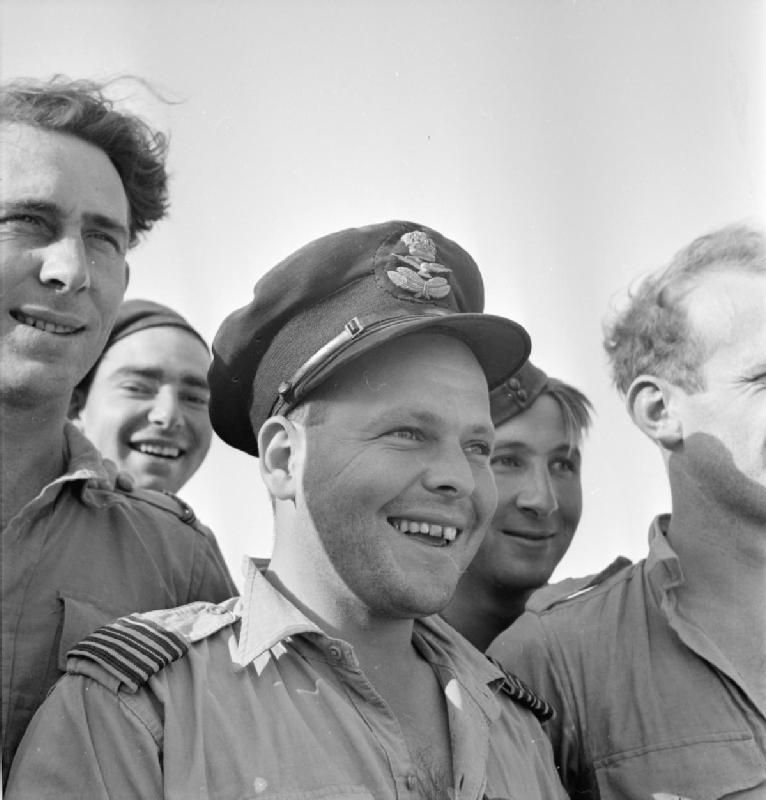
Squadron Leader Gibbes as commanding officer of No. 3 Squadron, North Africa, shortly after being awarded the Distinguished Flying Cross in July 1942

Gibbes was awarded the Distinguished Flying Cross (DFC) on 28 July 1942 for his actions on 26 May, the citation noting his "exceptional skill and gallantry". On 1 September, he destroyed a Bf 109 and damaged two others during the Battle of Alam el Halfa, east of El Alamein. He claimed No. 3 Squadron's 200th victim, a Bf 109F, during the Battle of El Alamein on 28 October. Air Marshal Sir Peter Drummond, Deputy Air Officer Commanding-in-Chief Middle East, sent him a signal reading "Heartiest congratulations to you and all ranks in the squadron on the achievement of your double century—not out." Around this time Gibbes also managed to fly Bf 109F and G fighters captured from the Germans, and came away impressed. He was credited with another Bf 109 on 17 November. On 21 December, he landed his Kittyhawk in rugged terrain near Hun, Libya, to rescue a fellow pilot who had been forced down. Gibbes threw out his own parachute to make room in the cockpit for his passenger and lost part of his undercarriage taking off, necessitating a one-wheeled landing back at base. Recommended for the Victoria Cross for this action, he was instead awarded the Distinguished Service Order, which was promulgated on 15 January 1943 and cited his "outstanding qualities of leadership and enthusiasm". Gibbes crash landed behind enemy lines on 14 January 1943, walking 50 miles (80 km) in the desert before being picked up by a British Army patrol. He was awarded a bar to his DFC for this feat, and for his "exceptional leadership, skill and courage, contributing in a large measure to the success of the squadron he commands". The award made him the most highly decorated pilot in the RAAF.

On 22 January 1943, Gibbes claimed his last kill, a C.202. He was officially credited with 10¼ victories, also reported as a score of 12, including 2 shared. He was further credited with 5 "probables", and another 16 damaged. During his tour of duty in the Middle East, he flew 274 sorties and became No. 3 Squadron's longest-serving wartime commanding officer. Squadron member Bob Smith recalled him as lacking somewhat in administrative ability, but an "Errol Flynn" in the air. Gibbes, for his part, later admitted to being in "an absolute state of terror" before missions, only to "sort of become mechanical" once the shooting started. He described his post-combat feelings thus:

Man becomes animal when he thinks he is about to die. As you fly back to your base, now safe at last, a feeling of light-hearted exuberance comes over you. It is wonderful to still be alive and it is, I think, merely the after-effect of violent, terrible fear.

=== South West Pacific ===
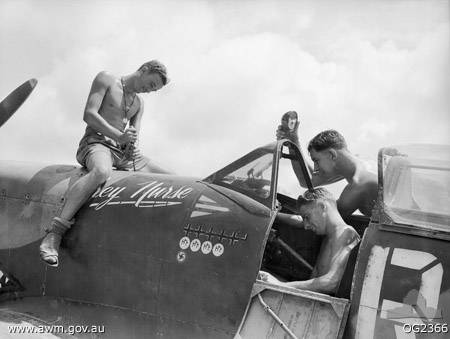
Ground crew service Gibbes's Spitfire "Grey Nurse" on Morotai, Dutch East Indies, in 1945

Gibbes handed over command of No. 3 Squadron to Squadron Leader Brian Eaton on 19 April 1943. His rank of squadron leader confirmed the same month, Gibbes departed North Africa to serve at RAAF Overseas Headquarters, London, until October. While in England he converted to de Havilland Mosquito night fighters and was slated to command No. 464 Squadron RAAF, but was instead posted back to Australia, via Canada. There, according to Gibbes, he gave a series of morale-building lectures on air combat to Empire Air Training Scheme students: "So I, you know, went round and lied like hell. I said that it was all a piece of cake." In January 1944, he joined No. 2 Operational Training Unit (OTU) at Mildura, Victoria, becoming chief flying instructor in March. He worked with Clive Caldwell, Australia's top-scoring ace, to improve the success rate at No. 2 OTU by personally selecting the most promising pilots from local service flying training schools. Gibbes was promoted to temporary wing commander on 1 July. In October he was posted to Darwin in the Northern Territory, flying Supermarine Spitfires as wing leader of No. 80 Wing. The role made him deputy to Group Captain Caldwell, the wing's commanding officer. Gibbes later suffered burns in a crash landing following engine failure. In December he met, in his own words, "a little dark-haired popsy" named Jeannine Ince, a volunteer with the Red Cross who had nursed him in hospital. They married on 23 January 1945.

No. 80 Wing had begun transferring to the Dutch East Indies in December 1944, and the main body followed in January 1945. Gibbes' injuries prevented him from joining the formation at its base on Morotai, where it came under the control of the Australian First Tactical Air Force (No. 1 TAF), until 9 March. Once there, he took over as temporary commanding officer for a few days when Caldwell was called to Manila. In April, Gibbes was one of eight senior pilots, including Caldwell and fellow aces Wilf Arthur and John Waddy, who tendered their resignations in protest at the relegation of RAAF fighter squadrons to apparently worthless ground-attack missions. The incident became known as the "Morotai Mutiny". Gibbes said later, "after I myself had been operating for a week or so and had a really good look around and seen the futility of the operations which had been given, I could not see any point in carrying on. I certainly lost all keenness for remaining in the service." As a former jackaroo, he was especially upset about one sortie that involved attacking cattle: "I felt horrible about it, being an ex bushy ... at about lunch time I went out and darned if I didn't have to turn butcher. And Heavens, it was butchering too, in every sense of the word. No—not the Japs. Cattle ... If we are to get the Japs out of this area without loss of human lives, starvation will be our main weapon ... God, I hated doing it but could do nothing else. Felt as sick as hell." No action was taken against the "mutineers" for their attempted resignations; a subsequent government inquiry found that their protest was justified. In the meantime, Gibbes and Caldwell were court martialled for their involvement in alcohol trafficking on Morotai. Both were reduced to the rank of flight lieutenant; the Air Officer Commanding No. 1 TAF, Air Commodore Harry Cobby, himself shortly to be dismissed over the "mutiny", restored Gibbes to squadron leader effective 23 April.

== Post-war career and later life ==
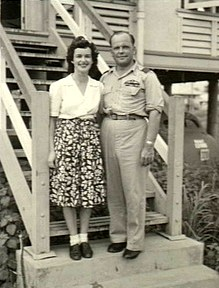
Wing Commander Gibbes with wife Jean in Darwin, 1945

In July 1945, Gibbes was assigned to the staff of RAAF Headquarters, Melbourne. Following his discharge from the Air Force on 11 January 1946, he was initially employed as a stock and station agent in Coonamble, New South Wales. He flew a Butler Bat twin-engined aircraft to facilitate his work, reportedly the only New South Welshman in his profession to do so at the time. Gibbes spent much of the next 30 years in New Guinea, pioneering the island's transport, coffee and hospitality industries. In January 1948, he formed Gibbes Sepik Airways using, among other types, three German Junkers Ju 52s, one of which was said to have been the personal transport of senior Luftwaffe commander Albert Kesselring. He was joined briefly in this venture, headquartered at Wewak, by Nicky Barr. Gibbes also established a tea and coffee plantation at Mount Hagen, New Guinea, in 1950, and served as a member of the RAAF Active Reserve, based in Townsville, Queensland, from 1952 until 1957. In 1958, he sold his share in Gibbes Sepik Airways to Mandated Airlines, which was later bought out by Ansett Australia. He continued to develop coffee plantations in New Guinea, and built a large chain of hotels beginning with the Bird of Paradise in Goroka.

Gibbes sold his interests in New Guinea in 1972. He spent most of the remainder of the decade in the Mediterranean, aboard his catamaran Billabong. In his 60s, he sailed Billabong from England to Australia by himself, braving heavy seas and Malaysian pirates along the way. By 1979 he was living in Sydney and had begun building his own twin-engined plane, which he eventually took to the air in 1990. In 1994, Gibbes published his autobiography, You Live But Once. He continued to fly until forced to give up his civil aviation licence at the age of 85. In 2002, he appeared in an episode of the television series Australian Story dedicated to Nicky Barr. Gibbes was awarded the Medal of the Order of Australia on 26 January 2004 for "service to aviation and to tourism, particularly in Papua New Guinea". He died of a stroke at Mona Vale Hospital in Sydney on 11 April 2007, aged 90, and was survived by his wife and two daughters. His funeral service at St Thomas' Church, North Sydney, was attended by 350 mourners, including the Chief of Air Force, Air Marshal Geoff Shepherd, and 40 members of No. 3 Squadron led by the commanding officer. A Spitfire in the "Grey Nurse" livery of one of Gibbes' World War II aircraft overflew the church, along with four F/A-18 Hornet jet fighters from No. 3 Squadron in a "missing man" formation.
