= No. 78 Wing RAAF =

- No. 78 Wing's crest
- Active: 1943–67; 2000–current
- Country: Australia
- Branch: Royal Australian Air Force
- Role: Operational training
- Part of: Air Combat Group
- Headquarters: RAAF Base Williamtown
- Motto(s): Fight
- Engagements: World War II: South West Pacific theatre; Operation Reckless; Battle of Tarakan; Battle of North Borneo; Battle of Balikpapan; Malayan Emergency; Indonesia–Malaysia confrontation

Commanders
- Notable commanders: Wilfred Arthur (1945); Alan Rawlinson (1945–46); Dick Cresswell (1947–48); Brian Eaton (1952–54); Glen Cooper (1957–60)

Aircraft flown
- Trainer: Hawk 127

No. 78 Wing is a Royal Australian Air Force (RAAF) operational training wing, headquartered at RAAF Base Williamtown, New South Wales. It comprises Nos. 76 and 79 Squadrons, operating the BAE Hawk 127 lead-in fighter, and No. 278 Squadron, a technical training unit. No. 79 Squadron, located at RAAF Base Pearce, Western Australia, is responsible for converting new pilots to fast jets, while No. 76 Squadron at Williamtown conducts introductory fighter courses; both units also fly support missions for the Royal Australian Navy and the Australian Army.

Formed as a fighter wing in November 1943, No. 78 Wing comprised three flying units, Nos. 75, 78 and 80 Squadrons, operating P-40 Kittyhawks in the South West Pacific theatre of World War II. After the war, it re-equipped with P-51 Mustangs at Williamtown. During the early 1950s, the wing was based at Malta on garrison duties with the Royal Air Force, operating two squadrons of De Havilland Vampire jet fighters. Re-equipped with CAC Sabres, it deployed with Nos. 3 and 77 Squadrons to Malaya in 1958–59, flying sorties against communist insurgents in the final years of the Emergency. In the 1960s, it was tasked with providing regional air defence during the Konfrontasi between Indonesia and Malaysia, and supplied the equipment and personnel for the RAAF contingent operating from Ubon Air Base in Thailand. No. 78 Wing was disbanded in November 1967, and re-formed for its present role as an operational training wing in February 2000.

== History ==
=== World War II ===
No. 78 Wing was formed on 24 November 1943 at Townsville, Queensland, under the command of Wing Commander (later Group Captain) W.D. Brookes. Along with No. 77 Wing, it came under the control of No. 10 Operational Group, a mobile strike force supporting the Allied armies as they advanced in the South West Pacific theatre. No. 78 Wing's flying units were originally to have consisted of No. 80 Squadron, operating P-40 Kittyhawk fighters, and Nos. 452 and 457 Squadrons, operating Spitfires. The Spitfire squadrons could not be released from duty in the North-Western Area as planned, and Nos. 75 and 78 Squadrons took their place, making the formation an all-Kittyhawk force. No. 78 Wing flew combat air patrols and ground-attack missions during Operations Reckless and Persecution, the assault on Hollandia and Aitape, New Guinea, in April 1944. By the middle of the year, the wing's flying hours in New Guinea were consistently higher than those of its counterparts in the US Fifth Air Force.

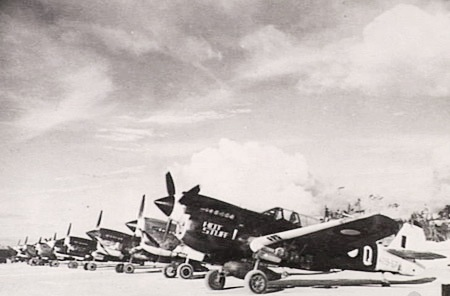
No. 78 Squadron Kittyhawks in late 1944

When No. 10 Operational Group was re-formed as the Australian First Tactical Air Force (No. 1 TAF) in October 1944, No. 78 Wing constituted its fighter contingent along with the recently arrived No. 81 Wing, which also operated Kittyhawks. The relegation of No. 1 TAF to areas of operations bypassed by the main Allied thrust towards the Philippines and Japan led to poor morale in late 1944 and early 1945. In April 1945, the newly appointed Officer Commanding No. 78 Wing, Group Captain Wilfred Arthur, helped bring about the so-called "Morotai Mutiny" in protest at the employment of Australian fighter squadrons for apparently worthless ground-attack missions. A subsequent inquiry cleared the pilots involved, finding their motives in tendering their resignations to be sincere.

Arthur retained command of No. 78 Wing for the invasion of Tarakan, which commenced on 1 May. Augmented by No. 452 Squadron's Spitfires, the wing was a last-minute replacement for No. 81 Wing—which had been delayed while moving its aircraft forward from Noemfoor and northern Australia—and had only ten days to prepare for the operation. As well as its flying squadrons, No. 78 Wing's complement included No. 114 Mobile Fighter Control Unit (No. 114 MFCU), No. 29 Air Stores Park, No. 28 Medical Clearing Station, and No. 11 Repair and Servicing Unit. On 25 May 1945, Arthur was succeeded by Wing Commander Alan Rawlinson. In June and July, the wing took part in the assaults on Labuan and Balikpapan, undertaking convoy escort in the former and, joined once more by No. 452 Squadron, ground-attack missions and close support of the Australian 7th Division in the latter. During July it flew 858 sorties, dropping over 250,000 pounds (110,000 kg) of bombs and expending almost 350,000 rounds of ammunition, for the loss of six aircraft and four pilots killed or missing.

=== Early post-war period ===
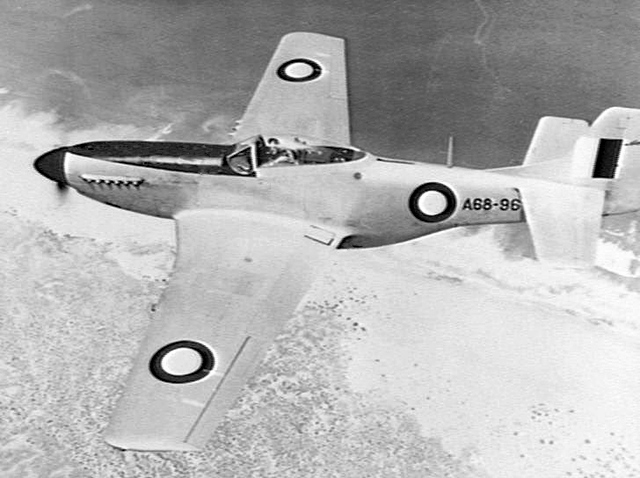
Wing Commander Dick Cresswell flying a No. 78 Wing Mustang, January 1948

Following the end of hostilities, No. 78 Wing, comprising Nos. 75, 78 and 80 Squadrons, and No. 114 MFCU, departed Tarakan for Australia. Arriving in December 1945, the formation was based initially at Deniliquin, New South Wales, where its squadrons were reduced to cadre status; No. 80 Squadron was disbanded there in July 1946. The wing and its remaining squadrons relocated in May and June to RAAF Station Schofields, New South Wales, and then in August to RAAF Station Williamtown, where they re-equipped with P-51 Mustangs. Rawlinson, now a group captain, completed his appointment as officer commanding in December 1946. Wing Commander Dick Cresswell held command of the wing—as well as the Williamtown base—from March 1947 to March 1948.

No. 378 (Base) Squadron was formed under the aegis of No. 78 Wing at Williamtown in June 1947; base squadrons were administrative and logistical units intended to make their wings self-supporting and mobile, in case of deployment. No. 478 (Maintenance) Squadron formed the same month to take responsibility for all aircraft and equipment operated by No. 78 Wing. Nos. 75 and 78 Squadrons were disbanded in March and April 1948, respectively. Nos. 478 and 378 Squadrons also disbanded in April, the latter re-forming as Station Headquarters Williamtown. For the remainder of the year, No. 78 Wing's aircraft and staff were gradually transferred to other units; by December the formation had been reduced to a strength of four airmen and no officers, and was declared "non-operative".

=== Malta garrison ===
No. 78 Wing was re-established in January 1949, comprising Nos. 75, 76, and 478 Squadrons, and No. 114 MFCU. It became the first wing in the RAAF to equip with jet aircraft, when its flying units took delivery of De Havilland Vampire F.30 fighters between 1949 and 1951; it was also allocated Mustangs and CAC Wirraways. The wing subsequently re-equipped with Vampire FB.9s leased from the Royal Air Force, in exchange for Australia's commitment to support RAF operations in the Middle East. Comprising Nos. 75 and 76 (Fighter) Squadrons, No. 378 (Base) Squadron and No. 478 (Maintenance) Squadron, No. 78 Wing was deployed to Malta on garrisoning duties under Wing Commander (later Group Captain) Brian Eaton.

No. 78 Wing Vampires at Ħal Far, Malta, 1952

As the RAAF's presence was essentially a symbolic gesture to demonstrate the Commonwealth's solidarity in the midst of the Cold War, the combat squadrons were half-strength only, operating eight aircraft each. In addition to the Vampires, two Gloster Meteor trainers were provided. Personnel departed Australia in July 1952; the posting overseas being a minimum of two years, families were permitted to make the journey as well. Although under the operational control of the RAF's No. 205 Group, the wing was under no circumstances to be used in combat without the express permission of the Australian government. The airmen participated in many NATO exercises while stationed at Malta, and one year took first and second place in the Middle Eastern Gunnery Contest for the "Imshi" Mason Cup.

Originally based at the Royal Navy's Ħal Far airfield, in south-east Malta, the wing moved in June 1953 to the centrally located RAF Station Ta'Kali, command of which was given to Group Captain Eaton. By this time, with plans afoot to form a Far East Strategic Reserve to contain communist aggression in South East Asia, the British and Australian governments began to discuss withdrawing No. 78 Wing from the Middle East when its planned two-year garrison was complete. Eaton handed over command to Wing Commander Geoff Newstead in September 1954. The wing flew its last sorties in December, and returned to Australia the following month.

Following its tour in the Mediterranean, No. 78 Wing was reorganised at Williamtown. On 16 March 1955, the wing headquarters was re-formed, and Nos. 76 and 378 Squadrons were disbanded. No. 75 Squadron remained with the wing, augmented on 21 March by Nos. 3 and 77 Squadrons. On 1 April, No. 478 Squadron absorbed the maintenance functions of No. 77 Squadron. Nos. 75 and 77 Squadrons initially operated Meteors from Williamtown and No. 3 Squadron was based at RAAF Station Canberra, where it flew P-51D Mustangs. By November 1956 the wing had re-equipped with CAC Sabres and all of its units were stationed at Williamtown.

=== Malayan Emergency and Konfrontasi ===
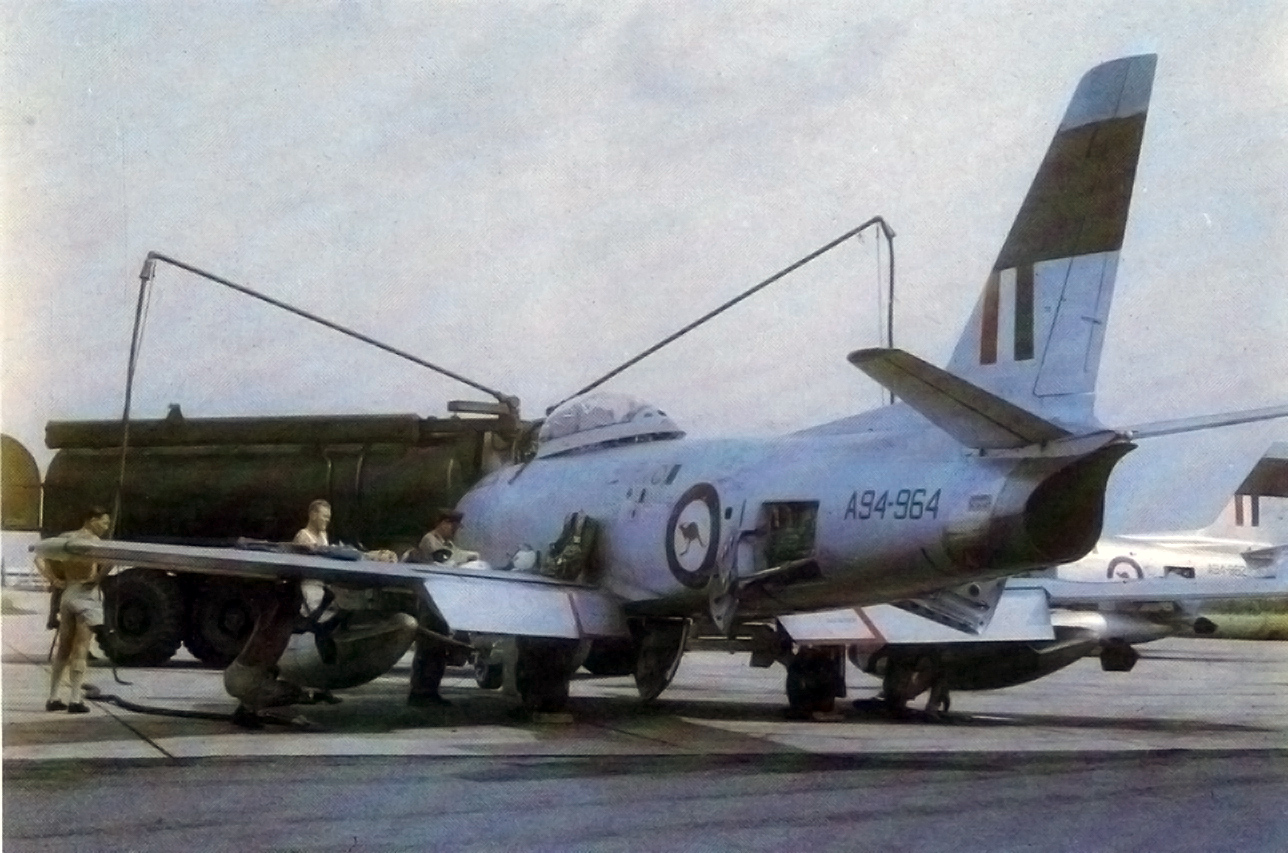
RAAF Sabres in Thailand, c. 1962

Group Captain Glen Cooper took command of the wing in 1957, deploying it between October 1958 and February 1959 to RAAF Base Butterworth in Malaya, where its flying units consisted of Nos. 3 and 77 Squadrons. No. 75 Squadron remained at Williamtown, subsequently joining No. 81 Wing with a re-formed No. 76 Squadron. Among the first aircraft to wear the Air Force's new "leaping kangaroo" roundel, the Butterworth-based Sabres flew several ground-attack missions against communist guerrilla forces in the last stages of the Malayan Emergency. Servicing for the aircraft was provided by No. 478 (Maintenance) Squadron. Armed with Sidewinder missiles, the Sabres were responsible for regional air defence during the Konfrontasi between Indonesia and Malaysia from 1963 until 1966, though no combat took place.

Between October and December 1965, a detachment of six Sabres, initially from No. 77 Squadron and later from No. 3 Squadron, was based at Labuan to conduct combat patrols over the Indonesian–Malaysian border on Borneo. In May 1962, in response to communist insurgency in Laos, No. 79 Squadron was re-formed in Singapore utilising No. 78 Wing aircraft and personnel. For the next six years this squadron operated from Ubon Air Base in Thailand and was manned by personnel from No. 78 Wing serving on six-month to one-year rotations. The RAAF was careful to not acknowledge any connection between the two units, however, as Malaysia had a policy of neutrality towards war in South East Asia. The squadron was disbanded in July 1968. No. 75 Squadron, equipped with Dassault Mirage III supersonic fighters, relieved No. 3 Squadron at Butterworth in May 1967.

=== Disbandment and re-formation ===
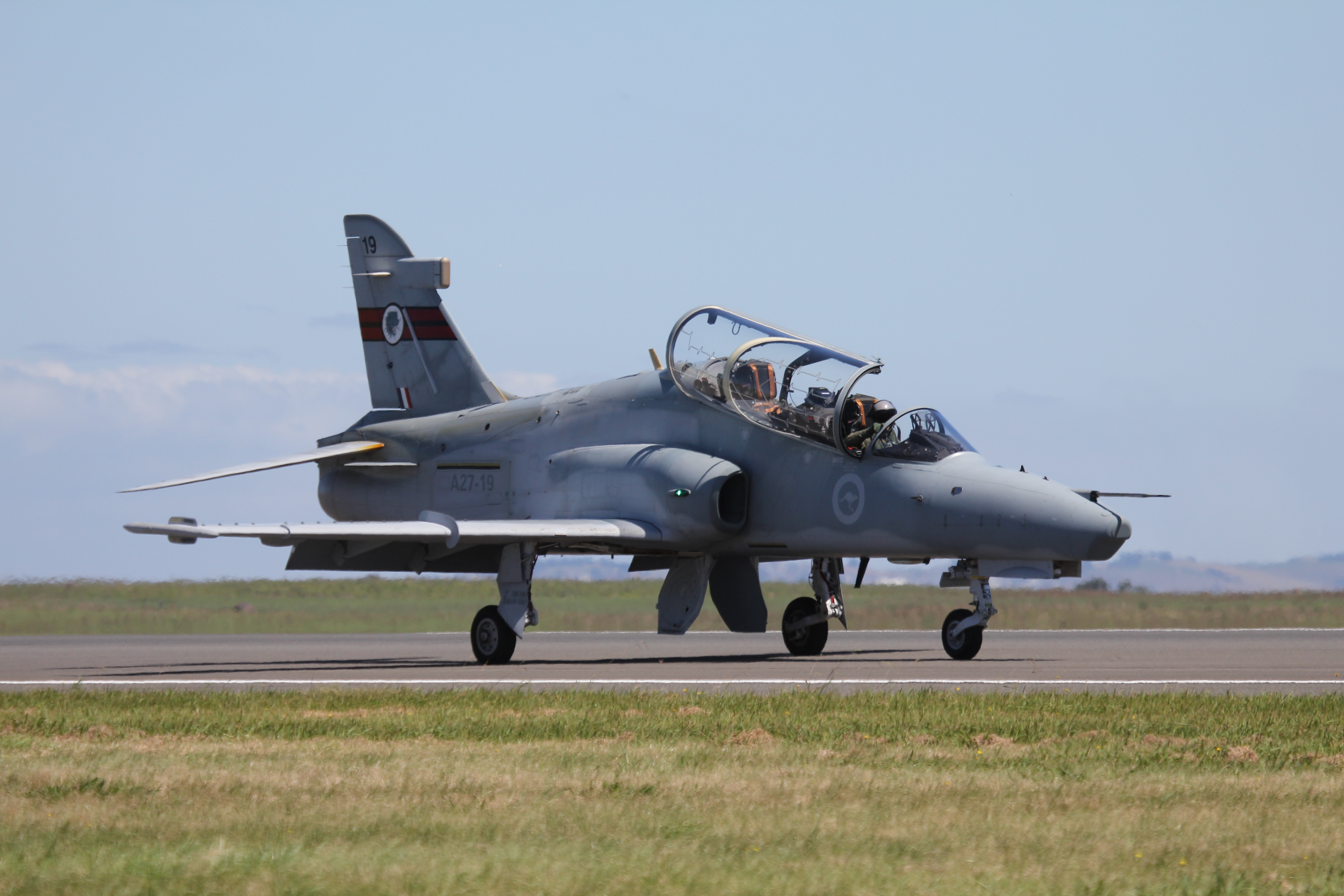
Hawk lead-in fighter of No. 76 Squadron, 2011

No. 78 Wing was disbanded in November 1967, and Nos. 75, 77 and 478 Squadrons became independent units under the command of Headquarters RAAF Butterworth. No. 77 Squadron returned to Williamtown in 1969 for conversion to Mirages, and was replaced at Butterworth by the Mirage-equipped No. 3 Squadron. In 1986, No. 79 Squadron was re-formed at Butterworth from No. 3 Squadron, disbanding two years later. No. 75 Squadron redeployed from Butterworth to RAAF Base Darwin, Northern Territory, in October 1983, and No. 478 Squadron was disbanded the same month.

In February 2000, No. 78 Wing re-formed to take charge of all aircrew and technical training on the F/A-18 Hornet and the BAE Hawk 127. Headquartered at Williamtown, it comprised No. 76 Squadron at Williamtown and No. 79 Squadron at RAAF Base Pearce, Western Australia, both operating Hawks, and No. 2 Operational Conversion Unit (No. 2 OCU) at Williamtown, operating Hornets. Each of these units had previously been part of No. 81 Wing. No. 79 Squadron's role was to convert graduates of No. 2 Flying Training School at Pearce to fast jets, No. 76 Squadron's to conduct lead-in fighter courses, and No. 2 OCU's to convert pilots to the Hornet fighter. In February 2002, No. 78 Wing came under the control of the newly established Air Combat Group, formed by merging Tactical Fighter Group and Strike Reconnaissance Group. The merger expanded the wing's responsibilities, as it took on lead-in training for the General Dynamics F-111Cs of No. 82 Wing. In July 2003 a technical training and simulator unit, No. 278 Squadron, with detachments at RAAF Bases Amberley, Tindal and Pearce, was added to the wing's complement.

As of 2012, No. 78 Wing's strength consisted of Nos. 76 and 79 Squadrons, operating Hawks, and No. 278 Squadron; No. 2 OCU had returned to No. 81 Wing's control. No. 79 Squadron continues to provide fast-jet conversion for recently graduated pilots, as well as refresher courses, while No. 76 Squadron conducts introductory fighter courses preparatory to students undertaking conversion to "classic" Hornets at No. 2 OCU or F/A-18F Super Hornets with No. 6 Squadron at Amberley. Both squadrons also fly close support missions for the Australian Army and the Royal Australian Navy.
