= No. 80 Squadron RAAF =

Royal Australian Air Force squadron

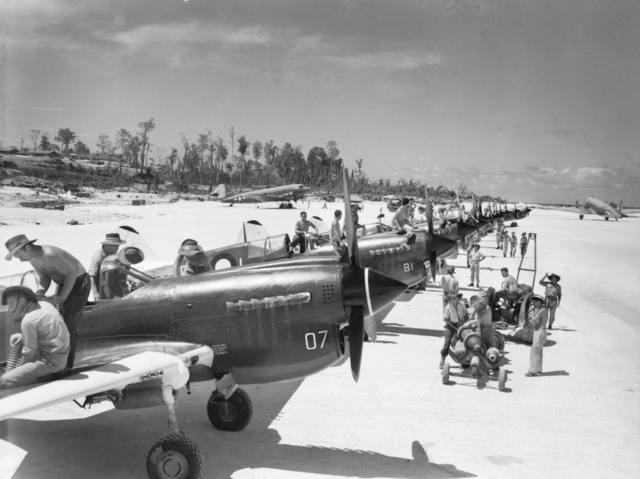
- No. 80 Squadron Kittyhawks being prepared for ground attack missions in November 1944
- Active: 1943–1946; 2024–current
- Country: Australia
- Branch: Royal Australian Air Force
- Type: Fighter (1943-1946); Software development (2024-current)
- Part of: No. 78 Wing (World War II); Cyber and Electronic Warfare Directorate (current)
- Motto: "Strike True"
- Engagements: New Guinea Campaign; Borneo Campaign

Commanders
- Notable commanders: Glen Cooper; John Waddy

Insignia
- Squadron code: BU

Aircraft flown
- Fighter: P-40 Kittyhawk

No. 80 Squadron is a Royal Australian Air Force (RAAF) unit. It was first formed in September 1943 as a fighter squadron. After seeing action in the South West Pacific Theatre of World War II, the unit was disbanded in July 1946. The squadron was re-raised in April 2024 as the Australian component of a multinational unit responsible for developing software.

== History ==
=== World War II ===
No. 80 Squadron was formed at Townsville, Queensland, on 10 September 1943 and was equipped with P-40 Kittyhawk fighter aircraft, under the command of the then temporary Squadron Leader Glen Cooper. It moved to Aitkenvale on 9 October and commenced flight training. On 13 November it became part of RAAF's main mobile unit, No. 10 Operational Group, upon its formation. This group's main role was to support the rapid advance of Allied units along the north coast of New Guinea. Once its training was completed the squadron moved again to Nadzab in New Guinea on 24 February 1944.

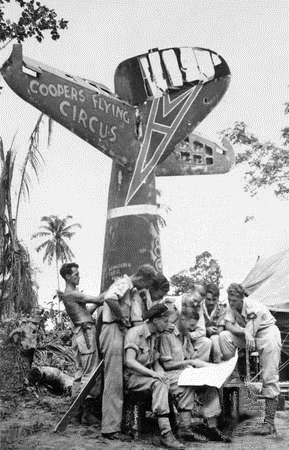
"Coopers Flying Circus": Squadron Leader Cooper (middle) with members of No. 80 Squadron in New Guinea, July 1944

The squadron flew its first combat sorties two days after arriving in New Guinea. Its initial operations included patrols around Nadzab, escorting Allied bombers and ground attack missions against Japanese forces in and around Alexishafen and Madang. The squadron moved to Cape Gloucester, New Britain on 21 March to escort convoys and conduct armed reconnaissance patrols. It moved again on 29 April to Tadji on the New Guinea mainland where it flew patrols to protect the Allied landing at Hollandia. The squadron moved to Hollandia after it was secured, arriving there on 15 May.

No. 80 Squadron continued to support Allied amphibious operations between May and July 1944. In May it covered the invasions Wakde and Biak from its base at Hollandia. This included attacking targets near the beachhead at Wakde while US troops landed. The squadron moved twice in July, arriving at Biak on 1 July and Noemfoor on 22 July. From its base at Noemfoor, No. 80 Squadron conducted ground attack operations over western New Guinea and the eastern islands of the Netherlands East Indies. These operations included attacks on Japanese watercraft and sawmills around Kokas Island and sweeps over the Maluku Islands in October.

No. 10 Group, of which No. 80 Squadron was still part, was redesignated the First Tactical Air Force on 25 October 1944. On 15 January 1945, four of No. 80 Squadron's pilots were ferrying Kittyhawks from Noemfoor to Morotai when they missed their destination and had to land on the Japanese-held Talaud Islands, where they were captured and executed. The unit completed its move to Morotai on 21 January, where it continued to operate over the Maluku Islands. The shortage of worthwhile targets in this area caused morale to decline in No. 80 Squadron and other RAAF units in the area from the end of 1944.

No. 80 Squadron was taken off operational status on 11 April 1945 to prepare for the Borneo Campaign. Later that month its commander, Squadron Leader John Waddy, participated in the so-called "Morotai Mutiny" as a protest against what he and seven other senior pilots saw as the misuse of the First Tactical Air Force in unimportant operations. While No. 80 Squadron's ground crew landed at Tarakan in early May, delays with repairing the island's airfield meant that the squadron's aircraft were unable to move forward until 22 July. The limited flying opportunities for the squadron's pilots in this period further reduced their morale. Once established at Tarakan, No. 80 Squadron flew close air support operations during the Battle of Balikpapan, but found few worthwhile targets.

Following the Japanese surrender No. 80 Squadron flew reconnaissance patrols over Japanese-occupied areas. The amount of flying was limited from September, however. In late 1945 the squadron's personnel embarked aboard the British aircraft carrier HMS Glory which carried them to Sydney via Manus Island. Glory arrived at Sydney on 12 December 1945 and the members of the squadron from New South Wales proceeded to Deniliquin and the remainder were sent on leave. No. 80 Squadron's strength was rapidly decreased, and it comprised only six men by 31 December. The last personnel left the unit on 9 May 1946 and it was disbanded on 11 July that year.

=== Current role ===
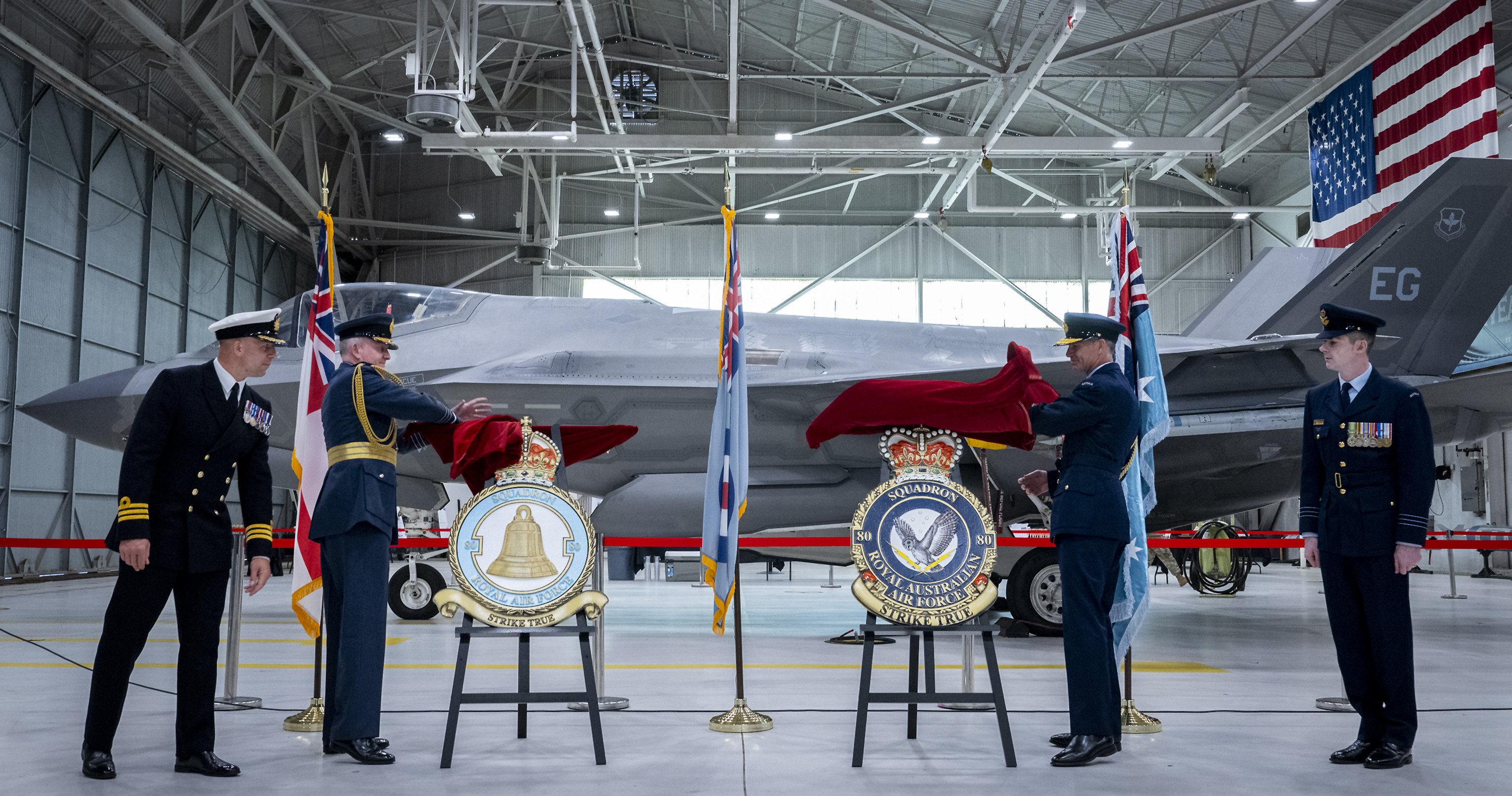
RAF Chief of the Air Staff Sir Richard Knighton (at left) and RAAF Chief of the Air Force Air Marshal Robert Chipman unveiling the crests of each force's No. 80 Squadron on 15 April 2024

In February 2021 the RAAF's Air Force newspaper reported that No. 80 Squadron was to "soon" be re-raised by re-designating a unit within the Cyber and Electronic Warfare Directorate.

No. 80 Squadron was re-raised on 15 April 2024 as the Australian component of the Australia, Canada and United Kingdom Reprogramming Laboratory located at Eglin Air Force Base in the United States. The Laboratory is responsible for developing and testing mission data files used by Lockheed Martin F-35 Lightning II fighter aircraft to detect and counter threats in the electromagnetic spectrum. The British element of the Laboratory was re-raised as No. 80 Squadron RAF in a joint ceremony held to mark the re-raising of the RAAF unit. This event was attended by both the RAF's Chief of the Air Staff, Sir Richard Knighton, and the RAAF's Chief of the Air Force, Air Marshal Robert Chipman.
