= Wing leader =

Tactical commander of a Commonwealth military wing

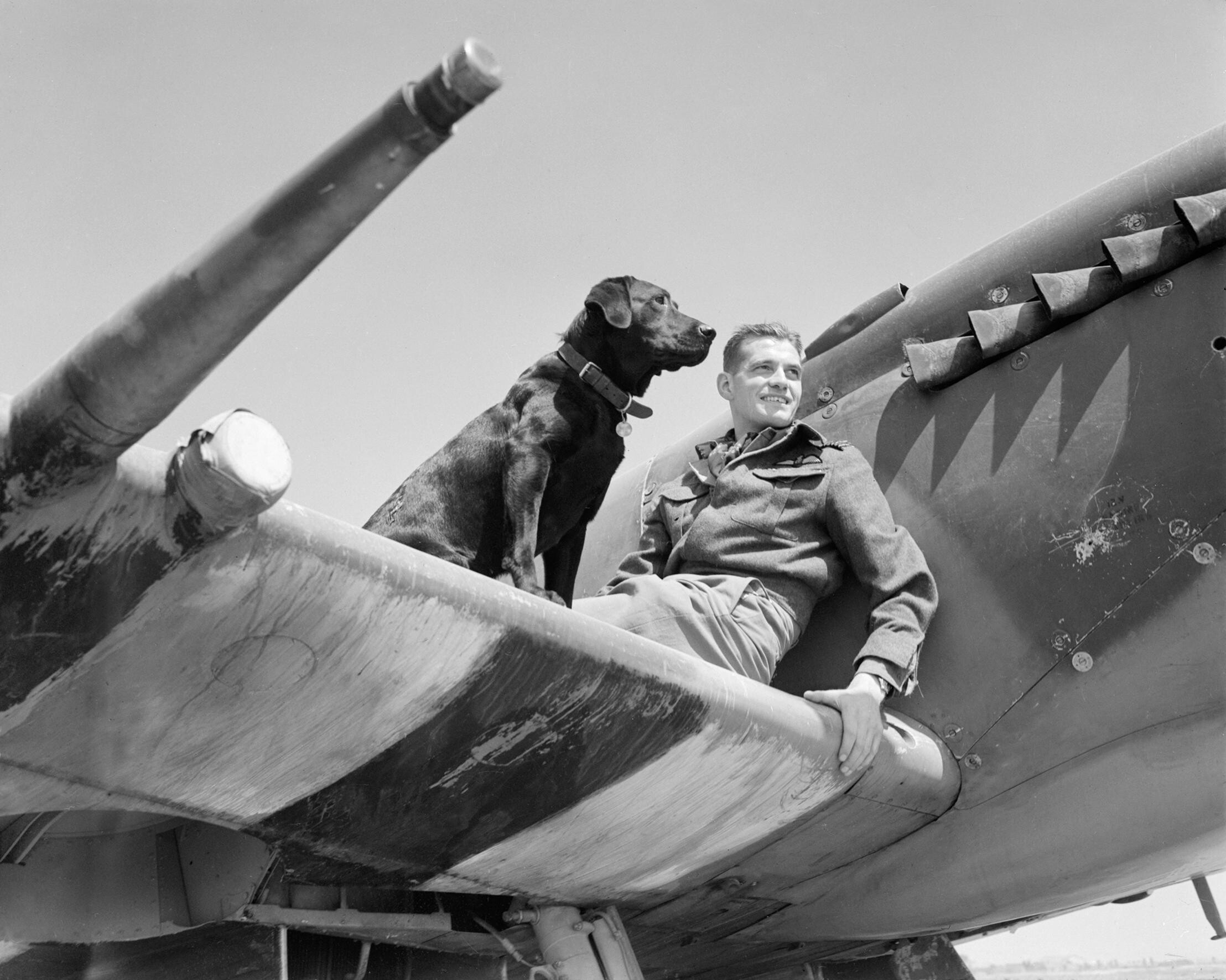
Wing Commander Johnnie Johnson as wing leader of No. 144 (Royal Canadian Air Force) Wing, with his Spitfire Mk IX and labrador Sallas in Normandy, July 1944

Wing leader, or wing commander (flying), denotes the tactical commander of a Commonwealth military wing on flying operations. The terms refer to a position, not a rank, although the role was usually taken by an officer ranked wing commander. The position was also distinct from the commanding officer of the wing, generally a higher-ranked officer. The first wing leaders were appointed in 1941, and the position remained in use until the 1960s.

== History ==
The role of wing leader originated in the Royal Air Force (RAF) during World War II, when senior fighter pilots, usually of wing commander rank, were given responsibility for coordinating the operations of several squadrons—originally three, later as many as five—in combat. Previously, such formations were led by the most senior or experienced commander of the squadrons involved. The "Big Wing" had been conceived as a defensive measure against German air raids during the Battle of Britain in 1940, when Squadron Leader Douglas Bader led the prototypical Duxford Wing in combat, though the distinct "wing leader" position had not yet been devised. In December 1940, RAF Fighter Command began preparing for offensive fighter sweeps over France, using massed formations under the tactical command of wing leaders, also known as wing commanders (flying). Two of the first wing leaders appointed, in March 1941, were Wing Commander Bader at RAF Tangmere and Wing Commander "Sailor" Malan at RAF Biggin Hill. Each led a wing of three Supermarine Spitfire squadrons.

Several of the early wing leader appointees were, like Bader and Malan, veterans of the Battle of Britain. Their average age in 1941 was twenty-eight to twenty-nine; in 1942 it was twenty-six to twenty-seven. Norman Franks has contended that, to be successful, appointees had to possess "clear fighting ability and an equally tactical ability to command more than one squadron in the air". Wing leaders did not have administrative or command responsibility for their formations; that role was reserved for a more senior officer, generally a group captain. According to Johnnie Johnson, wing leader at RAF Kenley and, later, of No. 144 (Royal Canadian Air Force) Wing:

The Wing Leader's job was every fighter pilot's dream, as the Wing Commander (Flying) responsible for his wing's performance in the air. The logistics were left to the Station Commander, usually a Group Captain, and the wing's three squadron commanders.

Wing leaders were permitted to use their initials on their aircraft in place of the usual squadron codes, to help identify them to their formation. Johnson, who displayed his initials JE-J on the fuselage of his Spitfire Mk IX, thought this was "really something, you really knew then that you had made it", though he had to override his intelligence officer's fear that it made him an attractive target for the enemy.

Members of other Commonwealth air forces who led RAF wings included New Zealander Al Deere at Biggin Hill in 1943, and Canadian Howard Blatchford at RAF Coltishall, also in 1943. RAF wing leaders in the Mediterranean and Middle East theatre included wing commanders Ian Gleed and "Cocky" Dundas, who led No. 244 Wing in North Africa in 1943 and in Italy in 1944, respectively. The Royal Navy also employed wing leaders—generally lieutenant commanders or majors in the Royal Marines—to control Fleet Air Arm (FAA) wings, which could comprise up to five naval air squadrons. Among the FAA's wing leaders was Lieutenant Commander Dickie Cork, who was appointed to lead a Vought F4U Corsair wing aboard HMS Illustrious in 1943.

The Royal Australian Air Force (RAAF) adopted the RAF concept of large fighter formations led by wing leaders for operations in the South West Pacific theatre, starting in the North-Western Area in 1943, with an air defence campaign that the RAAF saw in terms of another Battle of Britain. Wing Commander Clive Caldwell was appointed wing leader of No. 1 (Fighter) Wing, comprising three Spitfire squadrons, at Darwin, Northern Territory. The wing came under the overall command of Group Captain Allan Walters and Caldwell was responsible for flying operations. RAAF wings were also used on offensive operations in the Pacific, including No. 81 Wing, consisting of three Curtiss P-40 Kittyhawk squadrons led by Wing Commander Dick Cresswell in 1944–45.

The RAF continued to employ wing commanders (flying) during the early years of the Cold War, among them Wing Commander Alan Rawlinson, who was responsible for the flying operations of three de Havilland Vampire squadrons based at RAF Odiham in 1949–52 and Johnson, who was appointed to lead the Vampire wing at RAF Fassberg in 1951. RAF Bomber Command also appointed wing leaders during the early Cold War period, although the title was modified to wing commander (operations) and the role encompassed training as well as air operations. The position of wing commander (flying) was still in use in the RAF in the early 1960s.
