= No. 81 Wing RAAF =

Royal Australian Air Force unit

- No. 81 Wing's crest
- Active: 1944–48; 1961–66; 1987–current
- Country: Australia
- Branch: Royal Australian Air Force
- Role: Offensive and defensive counter-air
- Part of: Air Combat Group
- Headquarters: RAAF Base Williamtown
- Motto: Prepared to Fight
- Engagements: World War II: South West Pacific theatre; Battle of North Borneo; Occupation of Japan; Indonesia–Malaysia confrontation

Commanders
- Notable commanders: Gordon Steege (1944); Wilfred Arthur (1944–45); Ian McLachlan (1945); Glen Cooper (1945–47); Brian Eaton (1947–48); Mel Hupfeld (2006–07)

Aircraft flown
- Fighter: F-35A Lightning II

No. 81 Wing is responsible for operating the Lockheed Martin F-35 Lightning II multi-role fighters of the Royal Australian Air Force (RAAF). Headquartered at RAAF Base Williamtown, New South Wales, the wing comprises three combat units, Nos. 3 and 77 Squadrons based at Williamtown and No. 75 Squadron at RAAF Base Tindal, Northern Territory, as well as an operational conversion unit at Williamtown. No. 81 Wing headquarters oversees squadron training in air-to-air and air-to-ground tactics, and support for the Australian Army and Royal Australian Navy. Tasked with offensive and defensive counter-air operations, the Hornets have been deployed to Diego Garcia in 2001–02, when they provided local air defence, to Iraq in 2003, when they saw action flying fighter escort and close air support missions in concert with Coalition forces, and to the Middle East in 2015–16, when they undertook strike operations during the military intervention against ISIL. They have also been employed to patrol high-profile events in Australia, including the Commonwealth Games and visits by foreign dignitaries.

Formed in April 1944, No. 81 Wing comprised three flying units, Nos. 76, 77 and 82 Squadrons, operating P-40 Kittyhawk fighters in the South West Pacific theatre of World War II. Following the end of hostilities, the wing converted to P-51 Mustangs and was based in Japan as part of the Allied occupational forces; it disbanded there in November 1948. Re-formed at Williamtown in January 1961, its complement included Nos. 75 and 76 Squadrons, and No. 2 Operational Conversion Unit, operating CAC Sabre jets. The Sabres were deployed to RAAF Base Darwin, Northern Territory, in 1964 to guard against possible attack by Indonesian forces during the Konfrontasi with Malaysia. No. 81 Wing converted to Dassault Mirage III supersonic fighters before disbanding in December 1966. It was re-formed again at Williamtown in February 1987, to operate the Hornet. The wing also controlled Nos. 25 (later 79) and 76 Squadrons, flying Macchi lead-in fighters, until they were transferred to No. 78 Wing in 2000.

== History ==
=== World War II ===
Established at Ballarat, Victoria, on 12 April 1944, No. 81 Wing operated P-40 Kittyhawk fighters in the South West Pacific theatre of World War II. Group Captain Gordon Steege set up headquarters on Los Negros in the Admiralty Islands on 30 August. Comprising Nos. 76, 77 and 82 Squadrons, the formation joined Nos. 77 and 78 Wings on Noemfoor as part of No. 10 Operational Group in September 1944. No. 10 Group was renamed the First Tactical Air Force (No. 1 TAF) in October. The same month, No. 81 Wing undertook offensive sweeps and ground attacks against targets in West Papua. In November, Nos. 77 and 82 Squadrons dive bombed Japanese airfields on Halmahera.

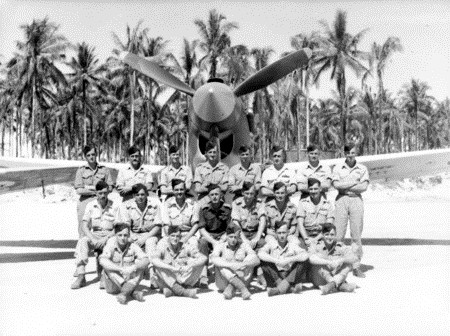
No. 76 Squadron pilots with a Kittyhawk fighter, 1944

The wing's aircraft flew 1,125 sorties in October and November, dropping over 400,000 pounds (180,000 kg) of bombs, for the loss of 15 Kittyhawks and 11 pilots. The relegation of No. 1 TAF to areas of operation bypassed by the main Allied thrust towards the Philippines and Japan led to poor morale. In December 1944, No. 81 Wing's new commander, Group Captain Wilfred Arthur, produced a "balance sheet" to demonstrate that the formation's combat results were not worth the cost in ordnance and casualties, setting in train events that would culminate in the so-called "Morotai Mutiny" the following year. By January 1945, the number of missions flown by No. 81 Wing had dropped to less than 400, from over 1,000 the previous month. In March, the Kittyhawks carried out some 80 patrols around Noemfoor but encountered enemy activity on less than half of these.

No. 81 Wing was slated to take part in Operation Oboe One, the invasion of Tarakan, in May 1945 but was unable to move in time from Noemfoor to its new base on Morotai in the Dutch East Indies; only No. 76 Squadron played any part in the battle, undertaking patrols and convoy escort. The following month, No. 81 Wing flew close support missions for the Australian 9th Division in Operation Oboe Six, the invasion of Labuan. Along with its three Kittyhawk squadrons, the wing's order of battle included No. 457 Squadron flying Spitfires, No. 25 Air Stores Park, No. 24 Medical Clearing Station, No. 22 Repair and Servicing Unit, No. 9 Repair and Servicing Unit Detachment, No. 111 Mobile Fighter Control Unit, and seven Radar Stations—a total of over 2,000 personnel. Its commander on Morotai and Labuan was Group Captain Ian McLachlan. No. 81 Wing was to have provided two squadrons in support of Operation Oboe Two, the assault on Balikpapan, in June but Tarakan airfield, from which it was to operate, was not ready in time. The wing was still based on Labuan when the Pacific War ended in August 1945. Calls soon came to serve with the formation as part of the proposed Commonwealth occupation forces in Japan, and many personnel volunteered to do so.

=== Allied occupation of Japan ===
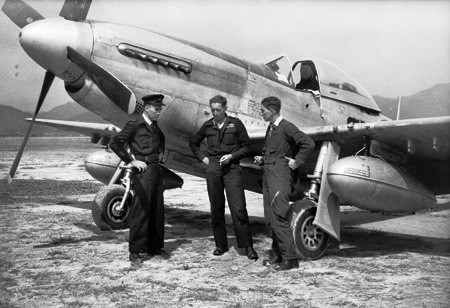
Pilots of No. 81 Wing with a P-51D Mustang, shortly after arrival at Bofu, Japan, in March 1946

The wing began re-equipping with P-51D Mustangs at Labuan in September 1945. No. 481 (Maintenance) Squadron was formed in December from elements of No. 22 Repair and Servicing Unit, No. 25 Air Stores Park, and other units based on Labuan. No. 381 (Base) Squadron, established in January 1946, also utilised personnel and equipment from No. 81 Wing's specialist units at Labuan, including No. 47 Operational Base Unit, No. 24 Medical Clearing Station, No. 25 Air Stores Park and No. 2 Airfield Defence Squadron. RAAF base squadrons were administrative and logistical units, intended to make their wings self-supporting and mobile for potential deployment.

Under the leadership of Wing Commander Glen Cooper, No. 81 Wing subsequently transferred to new headquarters at Bofu, a former kamikaze base, where it formed the Australian air contingent of the British Commonwealth Occupation Force (BCOF) in Japan until 1948, when the RAAF presence was reduced. The first of its units to arrive in Japan had been No. 5 Airfield Construction Squadron (No. 5 ACS) in December 1945, followed by the three flying squadrons in March 1946. No. 82 Squadron lost three Mustangs and an escorting de Havilland Mosquito in bad weather en route to Bofu, killing all crew members. The wing's strength was augmented by Nos. 381 and 481 Squadrons, and later No. 111 Mobile Fighter Control Unit (No. 111 MFCU). Also making the journey to Japan was the wing's mascot, Flying Officer (later Flight Lieutenant) Raleigh, "a small yellow dog and combat-seasoned veteran with over 40 hours operational flying to his credit".

As the Japanese offered no serious resistance to the Allied occupation, No. 81 Wing's prime operational duty was surveillance patrols. The RAAF personnel also helped maintain law and order, and supervised elections, while No. 5 ACS, as well as undertaking military construction, contributed to rebuilding local infrastructure. Otherwise they generally maintained a peacetime training regime. By late 1946, No. 381 Squadron was providing technical support to all BCOF squadrons, including five from Britain, New Zealand and India, as well as to the RAAF contingent. Group Captain Brian Eaton took over command of No. 81 Wing from Cooper in September 1947. The wing transferred to Iwakuni in April 1948, the same month that the Federal government determined to reduce Australia's contribution to BCOF and disband the formation, retaining only No. 77 Squadron in Japan. Nos. 76 and 82 Squadrons disbanded in October, the former subsequently re-emerging and joining No. 78 Wing when it deployed to Malta in 1952. No. 81 Wing headquarters and No. 481 Squadron were disbanded in November 1948, followed by No. 111 MFCU in January 1949. Detachments of No. 381 Squadron and No. 5 ACS remained with No. 77 Squadron under the aegis of a new organisation called RAAF Component, eventually disbanding in February and April 1950, respectively. No. 77 Squadron personnel were preparing to return to Australia when, on 25 June 1950, they were placed on standby for action in the Korean War, which had just broken out; the unit began flying missions over Korea a week later.

=== Re-establishment and Konfrontasi ===
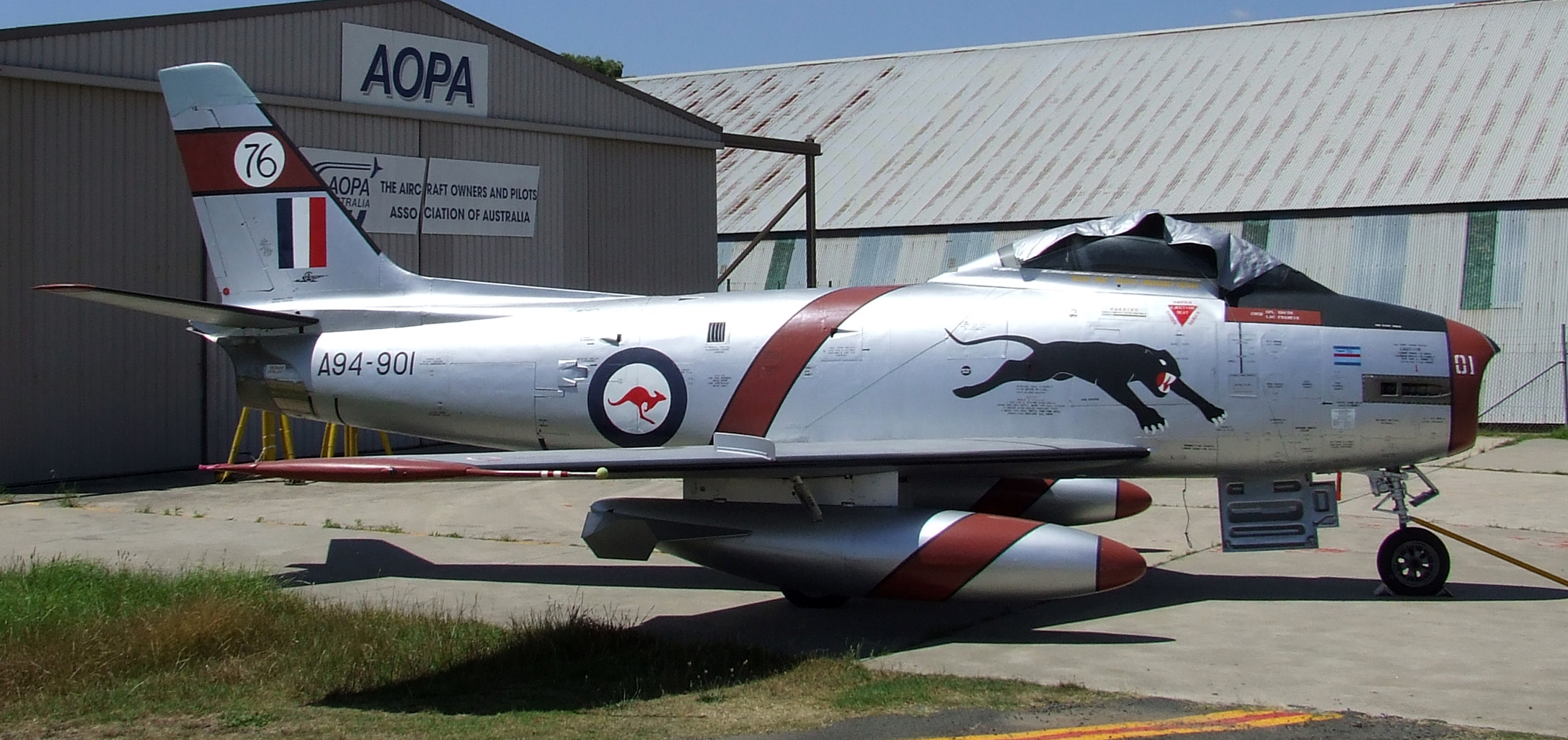
Sabre in the markings of No. 76 Squadron's "Black Panthers" aerobatic team

In January 1961, No. 81 Wing was re-established at RAAF Base Williamtown, New South Wales. Flying CAC Sabres, its complement included Nos. 75 and 76 Squadrons, as well as No. 2 Operational Conversion Unit (No. 2 OCU) and a re-formed No. 481 Squadron. In September 1964, Nos. 76 and 481 Squadrons deployed to RAAF Base Darwin, Northern Territory, as part of Operation Handover, a little-publicised contingency plan put into effect during the Konfrontasi between Indonesia and Malaysia. No. 76 Squadron's Sabres, armed with Sidewinder missiles, were to defend against possible attack by Indonesian forces following the recent establishment of the Federation of Malaysia. This was the first time since World War II that an RAAF flying squadron was positioned "in harm's way" on Australian soil. As No. 75 Squadron was effectively out of action pending conversion to the Dassault Mirage III, the deployment meant that practically the entire mainland fighter force had been committed to the north. The Officer Commanding No. 81 Wing, Group Captain A.F. Mather, took on the role of Area Air Defence Commander. No combat ensued, the Sabres' only interception being a Canberra bomber of No. 1 Operational Conversion Unit, but the experience did reveal deficiencies in the defence of Northern Australia and contributed to the decision to maintain a permanent detachment of No. 81 Wing fighters in Darwin, and later at RAAF Base Tindal, Northern Territory.

The wing converted from Sabres to Mirages between 1964 and 1966, commencing with No. 2 OCU and concluding with No. 76 Squadron; the last-mentioned disbanded in 1973. No. 81 Wing itself disbanded at Williamtown in December 1966. No. 75 Squadron was based at RAAF Base Butterworth, Malaysia, from 1967 until 1983, when it relocated to Darwin. Following conversion to the F/A-18 Hornet in 1988, it transferred to Tindal. Owing to its remote location, it became the largest Hornet squadron, employing an extensive maintenance section to ensure readiness.

=== Current establishment and Middle East deployments ===
No. 81 Wing re-formed at Williamtown on 2 February 1987. Along with No. 75 Squadron at Tindal, its flying units consisted of Nos. 3 and 77 Squadrons based at Williamtown with No. 2 OCU, all of which had converted from the Mirage to the Hornet between 1985 and 1987, the last-mentioned being the prime operator of the two-seat F/A-18B trainers. Having continued to perform fighter maintenance through the 1960s and '70s, No. 481 Squadron disbanded on 31 January 1987. It re-formed the next day as No. 481 Wing under No. 81 Wing's parent organisation, Tactical Fighter Group (TFG), and consisted of two squadrons, Aircraft Maintenance Squadron Williamtown (AMSWLM) and Aircraft Equipment Maintenance Squadron Williamtown (AEMSWLM). By 1996, No. 81 Wing had been augmented by Nos. 25 and 76 Squadrons, operating Macchi MB-326 lead-in fighters, the former based at RAAF Base Pearce, Western Australia, and the latter at Williamtown, where it also employed Pilatus PC-9s for forward air control (FAC). On 1 July 1996, No. 481 Wing was reorganised as No. 402 Wing, incorporating a newly re-formed No. 481 Squadron as well as Weapon Systems Support Flight and Field Training Flight. No. 402 Wing transferred its functions to No. 81 Wing's flying squadrons on 31 July 1998 before disbanding in October. The same year, No. 25 Squadron was split, its Macchis now being operated by a re-formed No. 79 Squadron. No. 78 Wing was re-established in 2000 as an operational training formation, taking over Nos. 76 and 79 Squadrons, and No. 2 OCU. By 2007, No. 2 OCU had returned to the control of No. 81 Wing.

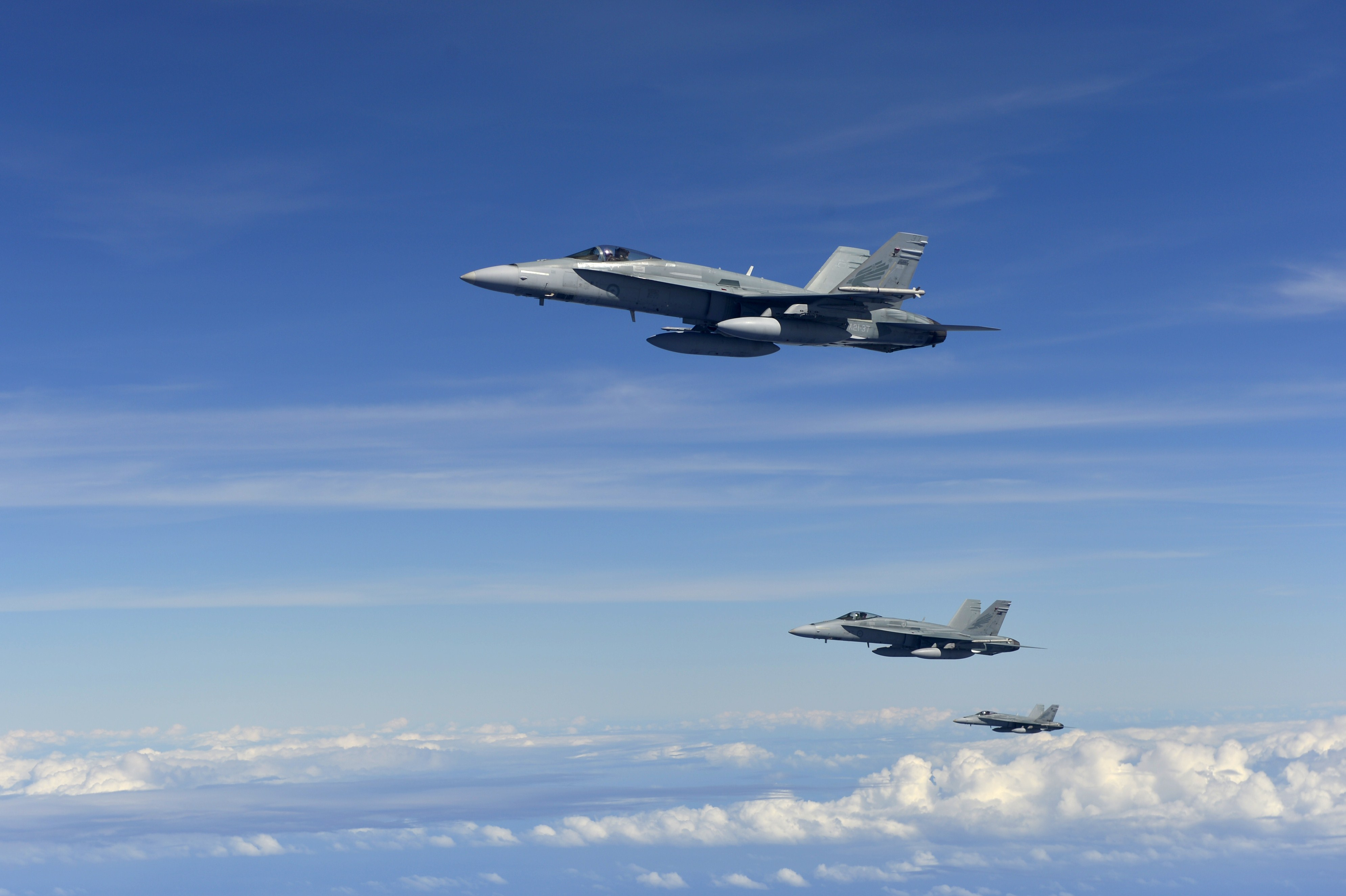
F/A-18 Hornets of No. 3 Squadron in 2013

From 2000 to 2003, No. 77 Squadron flew the FAC PC-9s previously operated by No. 76 Squadron; this role was subsequently assigned to the newly formed Forward Air Control Development Unit. A detachment of No. 81 Wing, consisting of Hornets from No. 75 Squadron and PC-9s from No. 77 Squadron, was prepared to support INTERFET operations in East Timor between September 1999 and February 2000, but was not required. Following the September 11 attacks in 2001, Hornets from both No. 3 and No. 77 Squadrons were deployed for air defence at the USAF base on Diego Garcia; no combat ensued and the planes returned in May 2002. That year, Hornets from No. 75 Squadron undertook combat air patrols in connection with the Commonwealth Heads of Government Meeting in Queensland.

No. 81 Wing became part of RAAF Air Command's new Air Combat Group when TFG merged with Strike Reconnaissance Group in February 2002. The following year, 14 Hornets from No. 75 Squadron deployed to the Middle East to support the invasion of Iraq, escorting high-value Coalition aircraft and later providing close air support to ground troops and air interdiction against Iraqi forces, the first time the RAAF had delivered bombs in anger since the Vietnam War. The Hornets were led by Wing Commander Mel Hupfeld, who became Officer Commanding No. 81 Wing in 2006–07, Commander Air Combat Group in 2009–12, and subsequently Air Commander Australia. The Hornets have also continued to play an air defence role in securing high-profile events in Australia, including the 2006 Commonwealth Games in Melbourne, the 2007 APEC meeting in Sydney, and the 2011 visit by US President Barack Obama. In March 2015, six F/A-18As from No. 75 Squadron deployed to the Middle East under Operation Okra, as part of the military intervention against ISIL. The aircraft replaced a detachment of six F/A-18F Super Hornets from No. 1 Squadron; the Chief of Air Force, Air Marshal Geoff Brown, announced that each of the "classic" Hornet squadrons would rotate through the region for combat operations every six months before the Super Hornets returned, for the duration of the deployment. No. 77 Squadron took over from No. 75 Squadron in September 2015, and handed over to the next rotation from No. 3 Squadron in April 2016.

== See also ==
- McDonnell Douglas F/A-18 Hornet in Australian service
