= Island Target =

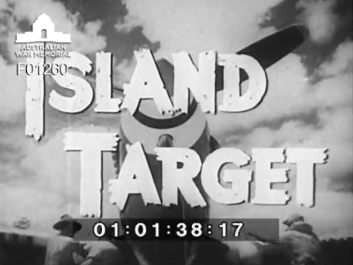
- Island Target film title
- Directed by: Flying Officer Ralph Smart
- Produced by: Jack S. Allan
- Starring: Squadron Leader Adam "Curly" Howie Brydon; Squadron Leader Colin Wellesly Lindeman; Squadron Leader Geoffrey Charles Atherton
- Narrated by: Wilred Thomas
- Cinematography: J. William "Bill" Trerise; William Carty
- Edited by: Frank Coffey
- Music by: Walter C. Bird
- Production company: Movietone
- Release date: 1945
- Running time: 20 mins
- Country: Australia
- Language: English

Island Target is a 1945 documentary commissioned by the Australian Government, Commonwealth Department of Information (Australia) during World War II. It tells the story of a P-40 Kittyhawk squadron of the Royal Australian Air Force.

It was made as a companion piece to Jungle Patrol, which concentrated on the army. The film purports: "This is the story of one squadron of Australian airmen whose daily job in the Western Pacific typifies the spirit of the Royal Australian Air Force."

== Production ==
The documentary was filmed between Jul - Aug 1944 in the North of Western New Guinea. The Melbourne Herald newspaper reported that the working title for the documentary was "No 13." and was to be based upon the Kittyhawk's of RAAF No 13 Squadron & No. 78 Squadron. The mention of No. 13 Squadron RAAF may have been an anomaly as No. 13 Sqn flew Beaufort Bombers and none appear in the final documentary. 13 Sqn was also based in North Queensland in Cook Town in May 1944 and moved to Darwin in the Northern Territory in Aug 1944. It may have been a mis-transcription of "30 Squadron" who appear in the film but were based on Bristol Beaufighters not Kittyhawks.

The scenes are not necessarily in chronological order and there is some noticeable lack of continuity in places. Footage has been edited to provide a storyline for the general public and to that end it follows closely the actual RAAF operations at that time.

== Crew ==
Flying Officer Ralph Smart was a RAAF officer at the time and was escort and Director. The cameramen Bill Trerise and William Carty had just filmed "Jungle Patrol". In the film Bill Trerise can be seen loading a camera into a modified belly tank of one of the Kittyhawks. Other production crew were:

- Editing: Frank Coffey
- Sound: Walter C. Bird
- Narrator: Wilfrid Thomas
- Producer: Jack S. Allan

The film was processed by Filmcraft which was the studio which had modern film processing in Australia in the late 1930s. Movietone Recordings was the production company.

== Plot ==
The film begins with the introduction of the Squadron Leader who is described as being from Armidale (Armidale, New South Wales), being 23 years old and having had his wings for 4 years. The Squadron is then launched to provide "Top Cover" to landing craft transports and an allied invasion fleet as its heads towards a beach head. The Squadron are there to keep Japanese aircraft away while the invasion force lands and defeats the Japanese garrison. The Americans and Australians are then seen landing on the beach head. The landing forces include RAAF ground staff who go begin the task of clearing the former Japanese airfield and expanding the area. The RAAF ground staff can be seen conducting surveying, mine disposal and bulldozer operations. Once the airfield has been completed the squadron moves forward to their new home. At their new base the Australians go about their normal camp routine, washing, cleaning and trying to survive in the poor conditions and in the incessant rain. Beaufighters are then sent out to conducting aerial reconnaissance and gather aerial imagery of Japanese positions. Once the imagery intelligence is analysed the staff identify the highest priority targets for the squadron. Ground maintenance staff continue to prepare the fighter aircraft and load the ammunition in preparation for the next mission. The aircrew prepares their emergency supplies in case of the need to bail out. Wing Leader Les Jackson then provides orders for the squadron. The squadron scrambles to conduct a ground attack mission on a Japanese headquarters. Although all aircraft return two of the aircraft have been damaged due to anti-aircraft fire.

== Subject matter ==
The film does not provide much specific information regarding names, dates and locations. Only the "Wing Leader", (Squadron Leader) Les Jackson is specifically named. A few first names of pilots as they land and take off are mentioned "Jim, Wally & Curly". A second film using the same footage however provides names of personnel, places and dates. The film, which is online, only picks up halfway through the original film and was broadcast on Australian Channel7 Two. The film provides much of the context for "Island Target". It is known that the filming was conducted Jul-Aug 1944 through multiple sources

The film is set in the wider context of the Western New Guinea campaign which began on 22 April 1944. The film is focused on a single squadron, 78 Squadron, however the aircraft are all part of 78 Wing which also included 75 Squadron and 80 Squadron. 78 Wing was part of the Australian No. 10 Operational Group RAAF.

In May 1944 the Wing was based at Cyclops Airfield near Hollandia (now Jayapura), Dutch New Guinea. From here they covered the landing of US forces at Biak island during June before their next operation in July. The footage at the start of the film appears to cover the allied invasion of Kamiri Airfield, Noemfor Island (Numfoor Island). The Island is a small island on the north of Dutch New Guinea Western New Guinea west of Biak. The Japanese had three airfields on the island including Kamiri Airfield which is the focus of the film. The day prior to the landings 75 and 80 Squadrons relocated from Cyclops to Mokmer Airfield on Biak to cover the Noemfoor operation. 80 Squadron patrolled over Biak during the landing on Noemfoor and then extended its patrols over Noemfoor the following day but had no enemy contact. The footage of the aircraft taking off is actually from Kamiri Airfield, the airfield they are about to capture and an example of the lack of chronological continuity of the film.

The Battle of Noemfoor commenced on 2 Jul with the landing of US troops and Australian support staff from No. 62 Wing RAAF (Works) at Kamiri airstrip. The Japanese were quickly overrun in fact not a shot was fired by the Japanese who were shelled and bombed prior to the landings. Clearance and expansion of the airfield commenced by the engineers later that day. By the afternoon of 6 July the first aircraft from the Wing had arrived at the airstrip Wing Operations Officer Les Jackson. This appears to be the 78 Wings Headquarters element stepping up to establish the Wings Headquarters presence on the island. The film depicts other Kittyhawk arriving as being the first, but are other elements of 78 Squadron arriving on 20 July, the ground staff had arrived two days earlier. The remainder of the Wing arrived from Biak on 22 July.

The next portion of the film is dedicated to everyday scenes at the camp. The camp is a collection of tents and demonstrates the rapid movement of the unit as the only semi-permanent structures seen are an air tower and large shed. In fact by July 1944 78 Squadron had moved six times in nine months.

The film covers reconnaissance by RAAF Beaufighters from 30 Squadron who locate and conduct aerial reconnaissance of the Japanese's positions. The film also captures an unknown downed allied pilot who is making his way down a river in an inflatable boat using a triangle to signal the aircraft his location. 30 Squadron were flying from Tadji Airfield (now Tadji Airport) near Aitape and did not arrive at Kamiri Airfield until 2 August 1944.

On return the aerial photography film is developed for analysis. This is then used by HQ No. 10 Operational Group led by Air Commodore Harry Cobby and the Officer Commanding 78 Wing Group Captain W. D. Brookes to develop the plan for the Wing to target these positions. Harry Cobby did not arrive until early Aug and had replaced Air Commodore Scherger who had been injured in a jeep accident.

The final portion of the film the Wing is briefed by the 78 Wing Operations Officer, Squadron Leader Les Jackson on 29 Jul 44. The briefing is for a Wing attack on Sansapor to harass enemy defences and sink supply craft. The attack is to supporting the US Army landing at the Battle of Sansapor on 30 July. The Wing departs and the footage captures strafing runs and fuel canister drops over the Japanese targets. All aircraft return successfully to Kamiri Airfield. The film implies that two aircraft were badly damaged however the aircraft shown were in fact involved in accidents. The first Kittyhawk lands with its port side wing partially destroyed which is attributed to the "Woodpeckers" aka Japanese Anti Aircraft fire. The damage was actually caused by a mid-air collision when callsign "Yellow 3" collided with his and another plane. The second Kittyhawk, was damaged while taking off in formation where it struck the propeller of RAAF Hudson on the right hand side of the strip, removing and damaging two-foot of the Kitthawk's starboard wing. The pilot, Flight Sergeant Roy John Sheppard was not injured and the aircraft was passed to 22 Repair and Salvage Unit (RSU) on 6 Aug 1944 for repair.

== Personnel ==
The following personnel have been identified in the film and confirmed through a second source.

- Air Commodore Harry Cobby, Air Officer Commanding No. 10 Operational Group from early Aug 1944
- Group Captain W. D. Brookes, Commander 78 Wing
- Squadron Leader Les Jackson, Most likely Operations Officer 78 Wing
- Squadron Leader Geoffrey Charles Atherton, Commanding Officer 80 Squadron (In command tent)
- Squadron Leader Adam "Curly" Howie Brydon Command Officer 78 Squadron
- Squadron Leader Colin Wellesly Lindeman Commanding Officer 75 Squadron
- Warrant Officer Peter Barton Lavender, 78 Squadron

Pilots mentioned but not confirmed.

- Greg Jones, Tom Jackman (Hit during staffing run), John Wadey, David, Greg, Bob Crawford, Jim, Wally

Identified through records

- Flying Officer T. R. Jacklin (Damaged aircraft GA-N)

== Aircraft ==
The main focus of the film are Kittyhawk P-40N aircraft from No. 78 Wing RAAF. The wing consisted of the following Squadrons which are identified by the markings of their aircraft:

- No. 75 Squadron RAAF (GA-#)
- No. 78 Squadron RAAF (HU-#)
- No. 80 Squadron RAAF (BU-#)

Also present in the film are two Australian Beaufighters. The one identifiable aircraft is LY-V placing it as part of No. 30 Squadron RAAF. The Squadron was part of No. 77 Wing RAAF and was also located at Kamiri Airfield from 4 August 1944.

== Release ==
Australian Prime Minister John Curtin viewed the film at the Capital Theatre on 11 January 1945 along with another DOI produced film, Australia is Like This. The film was in general release at least from 2 February 1944 where it appeared alongside commercial feature films of the time including The Way Ahead, Lassie Come Home, Song of the Islands and Gung Ho!.

== Reception ==
The Daily Telegraph described the film "As propaganda, and as entertainment, "Island Target" cannot lose in Australia...It is notable for its magnificent camera work by Trerise and Carty... however.... It lacks the first essential, a properly planned, explanatory script, properly carried out."
