= Charles Read (RAAF officer) =

Royal Australian Air Force senior commander

Sir Charles Read
- Official RAAF portrait of Air Marshal Read
- Born: Charles Frederick Read; 9 October 1918; Sydney, New South Wales
- Died: 17 September 2014 (aged 95); Woolgoolga, New South Wales
- Military career
- Allegiance: Australia
- Service/branch: Royal Australian Air Force
- Service years: 1937–75
- Rank: Air Marshal
- Unit: No. 30 Squadron (1942)
- Commands: No. 31 Squadron (1942–43); No. 77 Wing (1944–45); First Tactical Air Force (1945–46); No. 24 Squadron RAF (1950); Central Flying School (1952–53); No. 82 Wing (1957–60); RAAF Base Point Cook (1966–68); RAAF Base Richmond (1968–69); Chief of the Air Staff (1972–75)
- Conflicts: World War II; South West Pacific Theatre; North Western Area Campaign; Battle of Labuan
- Awards: Knight Commander of the Order of the British Empire; Companion of the Order of the Bath; Distinguished Flying Cross; Air Force Cross; Mentioned in Despatches

Air Marshal Sir Charles Frederick Read, KBE, CB, DFC, AFC (9 October 1918 – 17 September 2014) was a senior commander in the Royal Australian Air Force (RAAF). He served as Chief of the Air Staff (CAS) from 1972 to 1975. Born in Sydney, Read joined the RAAF in 1937, and began his career flying biplane fighters. As a Beaufighter pilot, he led No. 31 Squadron and No. 77 Wing in the South West Pacific during World War II. His achievements earned him the Distinguished Flying Cross and a mention in despatches, and he finished the war an acting group captain.

Read's post-war commands included the Australian First Tactical Air Force, No. 24 (Commonwealth) Squadron RAF, Central Flying School and No. 82 (Bomber) Wing. He was awarded the Air Force Cross in 1960. Following staff roles, Read took charge of RAAF Base Point Cook and the RAAF Academy in the mid-1960s, and later RAAF Base Richmond. In 1970 he was promoted to air vice marshal and became Deputy Chief of the Air Staff. He succeeded Air Marshal Sir Colin Hannah as CAS in March 1972, when the latter cut short his term as head of the Air Force to become Governor of Queensland. Air Marshal Read retired from the military in March 1975 and was knighted the next year.

== Early career ==
Born in Sydney on 9 October 1918, Read was the son of an immigrant from Bristol, England. He was educated at Sydney Grammar School, where he completed his Leaving Certificate. After working as a clerk in a motoring firm, Read joined the Royal Australian Air Force (RAAF) as an air cadet on 21 July 1937. He underwent instruction at No. 1 Flying Training School in Point Cook, Victoria, and gained his commission as a pilot officer in June 1938. Over the next two years he flew with No. 3 Squadron and No. 22 Squadron, which were based at RAAF Station Richmond, New South Wales, and operated Hawker Demon biplanes. He was involved in experimental parachute drops with dummies near Menangle; on one such test a fundamental flaw in the harness revealed itself when the dummy slipped clean from the chute, necessitating a redesign. By the time Australia declared war on 3 September 1939, Read had been promoted to flying officer. He later recalled a flurry of activity on the day, but with little real purpose: "After all, we were pretty remote from Europe".

== World War II ==
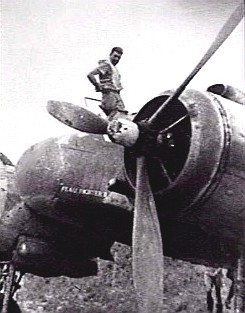
Wing Commander Read atop a Beaufighter of No. 31 Squadron in Coomalie, Northern Territory, 1942

Read was assigned to No. 30 Squadron flying Bristol Beaufighters after the unit was formed in March 1942; during this posting he reportedly flew a Beaufighter under the Sydney Harbour Bridge. Squadron Leader Read was subsequently given responsibility for raising No. 31 Squadron, also equipped with Beaufighters. After completing its initial training, the unit was deployed to Coomalie, Northern Territory, in October. Coming under the control of North-Western Area Command, it went into action over Portuguese Timor the following month. By April 1943, Read had been promoted wing commander. On 2 May, he led a low-level sortie against Penfui airfield, a key base for Japanese raids on Darwin, during which he destroyed two enemy Mitsubishi Zero fighters on the ground with cannon. Read was awarded the Distinguished Flying Cross for the "courage and skill" he displayed during assaults on Japanese installations, pressed home in the face of severe anti-aircraft fire. The citation was promulgated in the London Gazette on 2 July 1943.

Returning to Australia, Read held command of No. 1 Service Flying Training School at Point Cook from October 1943 until the unit's disbandment in September 1944. He transferred back to the South West Pacific theatre later that year as Officer Commanding No. 77 Wing, which controlled three squadrons of Beaufighters. Read led Beaufighters of No. 31 Squadron into action during the Operation Oboe Six landings at Labuan on 10 June 1945, and was the first RAAF pilot to land at the newly opened Tarakan airfield on 28 June. He was mentioned in despatches for the operational and administrative efficiency achieved by No. 77 Wing, and by the end of the war was an acting group captain on the headquarters staff of the Australian First Tactical Air Force at Morotai. He took over command of the formation following the end of hostilities, leading it into 1946 as its units were steadily disbanded. Read returned to Australia in early 1946.

== Post-war career ==
Read married Betty Bradshaw on 1 June 1946; the couple had three sons. He was the inaugural commanding officer (CO) of the re-formed No. 1 Flying Training School at RAAF Station Point Cook from November 1947 to September 1949. During this time he was offered a permanent commission in the post-war Air Force, with the provisional rank of squadron leader. Read was then promoted to substantive wing commander, and posted to England where he led No. 24 (Commonwealth) Squadron RAF from March to December 1950. Returning from England in 1952, he was made CO of Central Flying School at RAAF Base East Sale, Victoria, and went on to hold staff appointments at Headquarters Training Command from 1953 to 1957.

Ranked group captain, Read commanded No. 82 Wing at RAAF Base Amberley, Queensland, from February 1957 to July 1960, flying English Electric Canberra jet bombers. He was awarded the Air Force Cross in the 1960 New Year Honours. Read then served as Director of Operational Requirements at the Department of Air in Canberra. He was appointed a Commander of the Order of the British Empire in the 1964 New Year Honours for his work introducing aircraft and weapons systems into the Air Force, including two overseas missions for aircraft and equipment selection. In December 1964, he was promoted to air commodore, and the following year attended the Imperial Defence College in London. Read was made Officer Commanding RAAF Base Point Cook in January 1966, simultaneously holding the appointment of Commandant of RAAF Academy. He then served as Officer Commanding RAAF Base Richmond from March 1968 to July 1969.

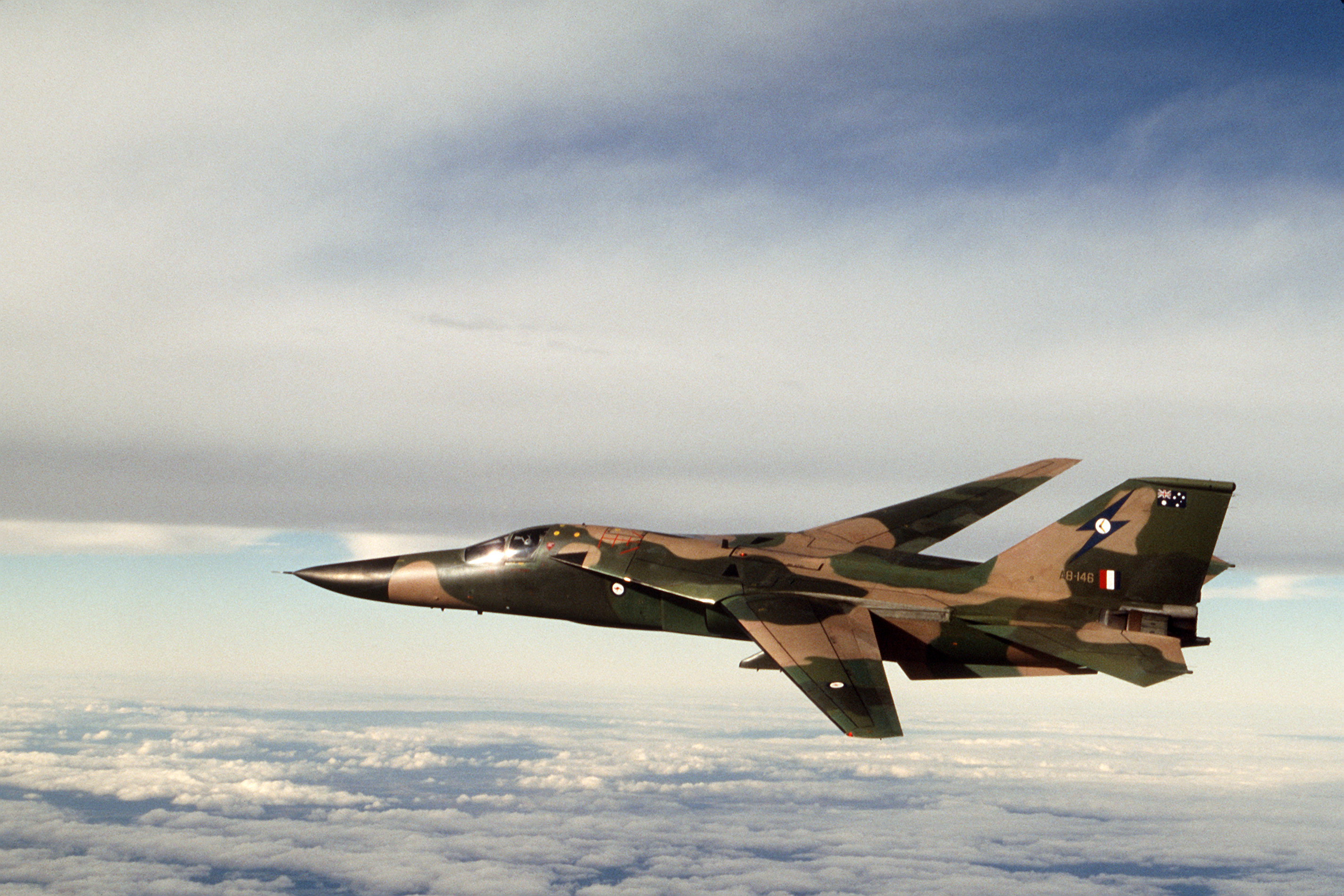
F-111C, which entered service during Read's term as CAS; in 1963 he had been on the RAAF team that considered the type's acquisition

Read was promoted air vice marshal and made Deputy Chief of the Air Staff (DCAS) in January 1970. In 1962, while Director of Operational Requirements, he had recommended the Boeing CH-47 Chinook helicopter for Australian service. As DCAS, after plans to acquire such a heavy-lift capability had languished for eight years, Read was able to finally give the go-ahead for their purchase. He led a team to the United States in May 1970 to review a proposal to lease two squadrons of McDonnell Douglas F-4E Phantoms to provide an interim strike force for the RAAF, pending delivery of the long-delayed General Dynamics F-111C swing-wing bomber. According to the official history of the post-war Air Force, Read's decision to take up the F-4E offer, over competing Hawker Siddeley Buccaneer and Grumman A-6 Intruder options, "delighted RAAF senior officers and aircrews".

In March 1972, Air Marshal Sir Colin Hannah resigned as CAS one year short of his planned three-year term, to become Governor of Queensland. Read had not been consulted by Hannah prior to the latter's departure, and was reputed to be somewhat reluctant to take over the CAS role. Nevertheless, he was promoted to air marshal and served a full three-year tour as the Air Force's senior officer. Read was appointed a Companion of the Order of the Bath in the 1972 Queen's Birthday Honours. A highlight of his tenure as CAS was the belated entry into RAAF service of the F-111C with No. 82 Wing in June 1973; as well as being an advocate for building up Australia's offensive strike capability, he had been a member of the 1963 mission led by Air Marshal Val Hancock to examine replacements for the Canberra, which led to the F-111's acquisition. Read ordered the Officer Commanding No. 82 Wing, Group Captain Jake Newham, to operate the F-111 with great caution initially, well within limits, lest the controversial aircraft suffer greater damage to its reputation through early attrition. Read felt that "the nature of the office of CAS changed for the worse" towards the end of his term as the RAAF's senior officer, as a plethora of committees sprang up in the wake of the Tange report on the defence force. In the words of historian Alan Stephens, "The seemingly interminable round of committee meetings which followed the Tange reorganisation made management very difficult, to the extent that Air Marshal Read often felt he was fighting against the system rather than working with it".

== Retirement ==
Read retired from military life on 20 March 1975 and was succeeded by Air Marshal James Rowland, who later became Governor of New South Wales. Considered disdainful of bureaucracy and some of the trappings of high office, Read refused to sit for the traditional portrait painted of former Chiefs of the Air Staff. As CAS during the Whitlam Labor government, which was generally antipathetic to imperial knighthoods, he was not raised to Knight Commander of the Order of the British Empire (KBE) until the 1976 Queen's Birthday Honours, after the Liberal Party under Malcolm Fraser had been returned to power. Originally from Vaucluse, in Sydney's east, by 2010 Read was living in Safety Beach, on the New South Wales Mid North Coast. He died at Woolgoolga and District Retirement Village on 17 September 2014.

== Notes ==
Military offices
Preceded by Air Marshal Sir Colin Hannah	Chief of the Air Staff; 1972–1975	Succeeded by Air Marshal Sir James Rowland
