= Australian First Tactical Air Force =

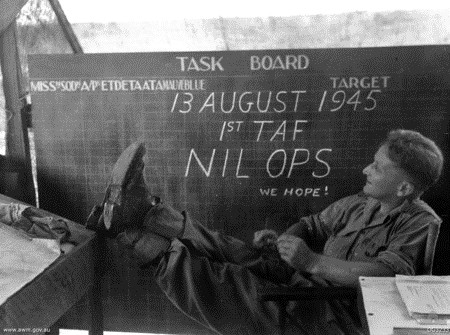
- No. 1 TAF Headquarters following the Japanese surrender; one further strike was flown after this picture was taken.
- Active: 1944–46
- Country: Australia
- Branch: Royal Australian Air Force
- Role: Fighter; ground attack
- Size: Three–five combat wings
- Engagements: World War II: Battle of Tarakan; Battle of North Borneo; Battle of Balikpapan

Commanders
- Notable commanders: Harry Cobby (1944–45); Frederick Scherger (1945); Charles Read (1945–46)

Aircraft flown
- Attack: Beaufighter
- Bomber: B-24 Liberator
- Fighter: P-40 Kittyhawk; Spitfire

The Australian First Tactical Air Force (No. 1 TAF) was formed on 25 October 1944 by the Royal Australian Air Force (RAAF). Its purpose was to provide a mobile force of fighter and ground attack aircraft that could support Allied army and naval units fighting the Empire of Japan in the South West Pacific Area. One of several Allied tactical air forces formed during World War II, it evolved from the RAAF's No. 10 Operational Group, established a year earlier. Following action in the assaults on Aitape and Noemfoor, the group was renamed the First Tactical Air Force to better reflect its size and role. It was beset with morale and leadership issues in early 1945, but recovered to take part in the battles of Tarakan, North Borneo, and Balikpapan. Reaching its peak strength of over 25,000 personnel in July 1945, No. 1 TAF's squadrons operated such aircraft as the P-40 Kittyhawk, Supermarine Spitfire, Bristol Beaufighter, and B-24 Liberator. The formation remained active following the end of hostilities in the Pacific until it was disbanded on 24 July 1946.

== History ==
=== No. 10 Operational Group ===
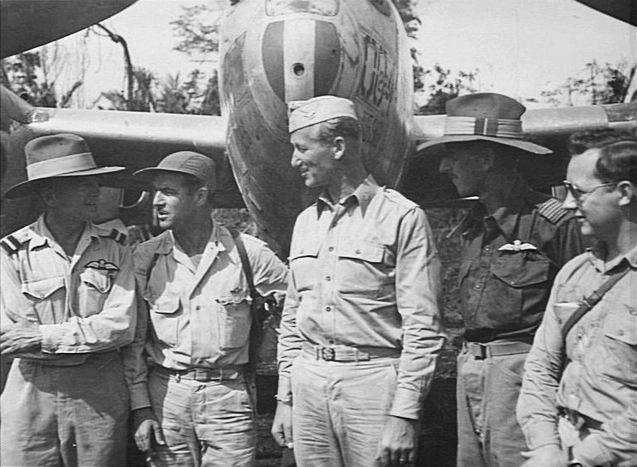
Air Commodore Scherger (left) with other Allied officers in April 1944, after the landings at Aitape

No. 1 TAF was formed as No. 10 Operational Group (No. 10 OG) on 13 November 1943, under the command of Group Captain Frederick Scherger. The group consisted of No. 77 Wing, operating A-31 Vengeance dive bombers, and No. 78 Wing, operating P-40 Kittyhawk fighters, as well as various ancillary units. It was to act as a mobile strike force capable of supporting Allied ground and naval units as they advanced against the Japanese in the South West Pacific Area (SWPA), as distinct from the RAAF's area commands then based in Northern Australia, which had a static, geographical defence function. No. 10 OG took over the mobile role originally undertaken by No. 9 Operational Group, which by 1944 had itself evolved into a static garrison force in New Guinea and been renamed Northern Command to reflect its new purpose.

After establishing headquarters at Nadzab, Papua New Guinea, in support of the US Fifth Air Force, No. 10 OG's first sorties took place on 13 January 1944, when Kittyhawks of No. 78 Wing launched patrols and bombing missions near Madang. By March 1944, No. 77 Wing's Vengeances had been withdrawn from operations due to their inferiority to newer equipment. Three RAAF squadrons—one each flying Bostons, Beaufighters, and Beauforts—were assigned to the Wing as replacements. Following his promotion to air commodore, Scherger led No. 10 OG in Operation Persecution, the assault on Aitape, New Guinea, in April 1944. With airfield construction elements of No. 10 OG going ashore shortly after the attack, Aitape airstrip was repaired and No. 78 Wing was operating from it within three days. This operation was followed by the attack on Noemfoor, commencing in June, by which time No. 10 OG's combat strength consisted of Nos. 71, 77, 78 and 81 Wings RAAF. Scherger was injured in a jeep accident that August and replaced by Air Commodore Harry Cobby.

=== First Tactical Air Force ===
No. 10 OG's name was changed to First Tactical Air Force (No. 1 TAF) on 25 October 1944, ostensibly to emphasise "the formation's impressive size and ambitious purpose". Its complement of units was much greater than that typically assigned to RAAF groups, which were themselves considerably larger than USAAF "groups" that consisted of three or four squadrons. As the conflict gradually shifted further north, however, No. 1 TAF was relegated—in the absence of a Japanese air presence—to patrol, reconnaissance and some ground attack duties, including the Philippines campaign in 1944 and the Borneo campaign in 1945. By early 1945, there was widespread dissatisfaction among the fighter squadrons of No. 1 TAF due to its new focus on close air support duties. The underlying cause was the reluctance of the Allied Supreme Commander in the SWPA, Douglas MacArthur, to use non-American forces for the main advance towards Japan.

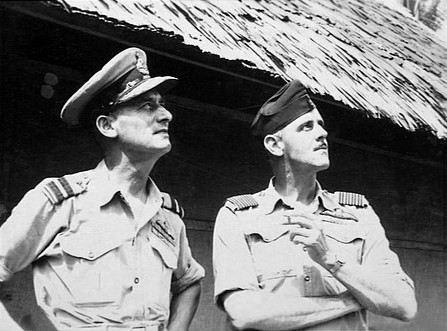
Air Commodore Cobby (left) and Group Captain Caldwell (right) pictured at Morotai in January 1945

Frustration was especially evident among highly experienced pilots, such as Australia's top-scoring ace, Group Captain Clive Caldwell, who commanded No. 1 TAF's Spitfire squadrons. This led to a series of events known as the "Morotai Mutiny" in April 1945. Officers based at Morotai in the Dutch East Indies, including Caldwell, protested the missions against what they saw as unimportant targets and tendered their resignations. Cobby was held responsible for the incident and eventually dismissed, being replaced by Air Commodore Scherger, who had recovered from his earlier injuries and who immediately set about restoring morale. He took over No. 1 TAF as Operation Oboe One, the Battle of Tarakan, was under way; the formation's airfield construction teams had been tasked with opening the runway on Tarakan Island within a week of Allied landings but extensive pre-invasion damage and adverse environmental conditions delayed this until the end of June. Poor planning on the RAAF's part was blamed on its earlier low morale and disruptions caused by the "Mutiny". No. 1 TAF then participated in Operation Oboe Six, the Battle of North Borneo, where its performance was much improved.

During July 1945, when the final Allied offensive of the Borneo Campaign took place as Operation Oboe Two, the Battle of Balikpapan, No. 1 TAF reached a strength of some 25,000 personnel, augmented by the B-24 Liberator heavy bomber squadrons of No. 82 Wing transferring in from North-Western Area Command. It was freed of garrison duties and had its strength reduced somewhat on 30 July, with the movement of units to the recently established No. 11 Group, which had been formed to command operations over the eastern islands of the Dutch East Indies and much of Borneo. Prior to the formation's disestablishment, No. 1 TAF units helped organise the medical treatment and repatriation of thousands of Australian prisoners-of-war. Group Captain Charles Read had taken over command from Scherger following the end of the Pacific War in August; by January 1946, No. 1 TAF numbered 1,400 personnel compared to its wartime peak of 22,000, and its remaining units were slated for imminent disbandment. No. 1 TAF itself was disbanded at Morotai on 24 July 1946.

== Order of battle ==
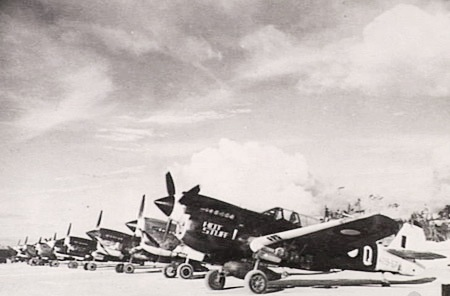
No. 78 Squadron Kittyhawks, Noemfoor, 1944

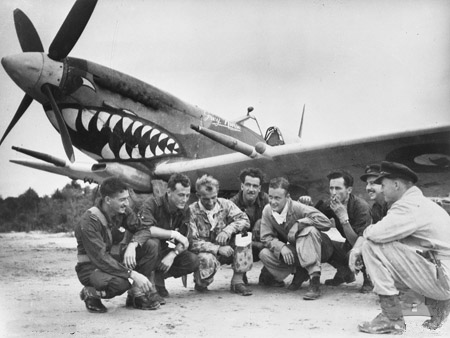
Pilots and Spitfire of No. 457 Squadron, 1945

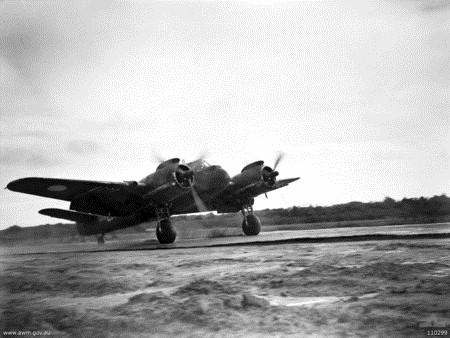
Beaufighter of No. 31 Squadron landing on Tarakan airstrip, repaired by RAAF airfield construction teams and army units, 1945

Upon its establishment on 25 October 1944, No. 1 TAF consisted of:

- Headquarters No. 1 Tactical Air Force
  - No. 77 (Attack) Wing
    - No. 22 Squadron (Beaufighter)
    - No. 30 Squadron (Beaufighter)
  - No. 78 (Fighter) Wing
    - No. 75 Squadron (P-40 Kittyhawk)
    - No. 78 Squadron (P-40 Kittyhawk)
    - No. 80 Squadron (P-40 Kittyhawk)
  - No. 81 (Fighter) Wing
    - No. 76 Squadron (P-40 Kittyhawk)
    - No. 77 Squadron (P-40 Kittyhawk)
    - No. 82 Squadron (P-40 Kittyhawk)
  - No. 61 (Airfield Construction) Wing
    - No. 3 Airfield Construction Squadron
    - No. 14 Airfield Construction Squadron
  - No. 62 (Airfield Construction) Wing
    - No. 4 Airfield Construction Squadron
    - No. 5 Airfield Construction Squadron

The following units joined No. 1 TAF shortly after it was established:

- No. 80 (Fighter) Wing
  - No. 79 Squadron (Spitfire)
  - No. 452 Squadron (Spitfire)
  - No. 457 Squadron (Spitfire)
- No. 31 Squadron (Beaufighter) under No. 77 Wing
