= Frederick Scherger =

Royal Australian Air Force chief (1904–1984)

Sir Frederick Scherger
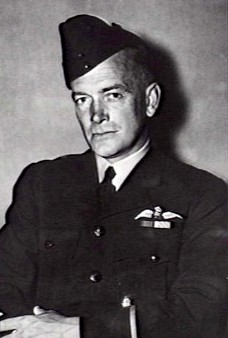
- Air Commodore Fred Scherger, c. 1945
- Born: 18 May 1904; Ararat, Victoria
- Died: 16 January 1984 (aged 79); Melbourne, Victoria
- Military career
- Allegiance: Australia
- Branch: Royal Australian Air Force
- Service years: 1921–1966
- Rank: Air Chief Marshal
- Nickname: "Scherg"
- Commands: Directorate of Training (1938–40); No. 2 Service Flying Training School (1940–41); RAAF Station Darwin (1941–42); No. 2 Training Group (1943); No. 10 Group (1943–44); First Tactical Air Force (1945); RAF AHQ Malaya (1953–55); Chief of the Air Staff (1957–61); Chairman, Chiefs of Staff Committee (1961–66)
- Conflicts: World War II; South West Pacific Theatre; Bombing of Darwin; New Guinea campaign; Operation Reckless; Battle of Noemfoor; Borneo campaign; Battle of Tarakan; Operation Oboe Six; Malayan Emergency; Indonesia–Malaysia confrontation; Vietnam War
- Awards: Knight Commander of the Order of the British Empire; Companion of the Order of the Bath; Distinguished Service Order; Air Force Cross
- Other work: Chairman, Australian National Airways Commission (1966–1975); Chairman, Commonwealth Aircraft Corporation (1968–1975)

Air Chief Marshal Sir Frederick Rudolph William Scherger, KBE, CB, DSO, AFC (18 May 1904 – 16 January 1984) was a senior commander in the Royal Australian Air Force (RAAF). He served as Chief of the Air Staff, the RAAF's highest-ranking position, from 1957 until 1961, and as Chairman of the Chiefs of Staff Committee, forerunner of the role of Australia's Chief of the Defence Force, from 1961 until 1966. He was the first RAAF officer to hold the rank of air chief marshal.

Born in Victoria of German origins, Scherger graduated from the Royal Military College, Duntroon, before transferring to the Air Force in 1925. He was considered one of the top aviators between the wars, serving as a fighter pilot, test pilot, and flying instructor. He held senior training posts in the late 1930s and the early years of World War II, earning the Air Force Cross in June 1940. Promoted to group captain, Scherger was acting commander of North-Western Area when Darwin suffered its first air raid in February 1942. Praised for his actions in the aftermath of the attack, he went on to lead the RAAF's major mobile strike force in the South West Pacific, No. 10 Operational Group (later the Australian First Tactical Air Force), and was awarded the Distinguished Service Order in September 1944 for his actions during the assaults on Aitape and Noemfoor in New Guinea.

After the war, Scherger served in senior posts, including Deputy Chief of the Air Staff, Head of the Australian Joint Services Staff in Washington, D.C., and commander of Commonwealth air forces during the Malayan Emergency. In 1957, he was promoted to air marshal and became Chief of the Air Staff (CAS), presiding over a significant modernisation of RAAF equipment. Completing his term as CAS in 1961, he was the Air Force's first appointee to the position of Chairman of the Chiefs of Staff Committee (COSC). As Chairman of COSC, Scherger became Australia's first air chief marshal in 1965, and played a leading role in the commitment of troops to the Vietnam War. Leaving the military the following year, he was appointed chairman of the Australian National Airlines Commission and, from 1968, of the Commonwealth Aircraft Corporation. Popularly known as "Scherg", he retired in 1975 and lived in Melbourne until his death in 1984 at the age of seventy-nine.

== Early life and career ==
Frederick Rudolph William Scherger was the third child of farmer Frederick Scherger and his wife Sarah Jane, née Chamberlain, both native Victorians. Born on 18 May 1904 in Ararat, young Fred was educated to junior certificate level at his local high school. His paternal grandparents were immigrants from Germany, and his family was the object of xenophobia in his childhood during World War I. This carried on into the early part of his military career and beyond; as late as 1941, the author of an anonymous letter from RAAF Station Wagga to Prime Minister Robert Menzies stated that his "blood ran cold" at the notion of someone called "Scherger" commanding trainee Australian pilots.

=== 1920s: Duntroon to Point Cook ===
Scherger entered the Royal Military College, Duntroon, in 1921 and graduated as a lieutenant in 1924, winning the King's Medal. Two days before graduation, he volunteered for an Air Force secondment, which was later made permanent. On 21 January 1925, he received a permanent commission in the RAAF as a pilot officer (temporary flying officer), and commenced his flight training at RAAF Point Cook, Victoria. He was promoted to flying officer with seniority from 21 January 1926.

Scherger quickly took to the art of flying open-cockpit biplanes and gained a reputation as a skilful if occasionally reckless pilot, being berated early in his career by his flight commander for "inverted and very low flying". He was one of the Air Force's first volunteers for parachute instruction, under the tutelage of Flying Officer Ellis Wackett at RAAF Station Richmond, New South Wales, and made the first public freefall descent in Australia, at Essendon, Victoria on 21 August 1926. In February 1927, he was asked by the commanding officer of No. 1 Flying Training School (No. 1 FTS), Wing Commander Adrian "King" Cole, to drop a message to a woman at Port Melbourne before she departed on a steamer. After doing so, Scherger illegally flew his S.E.5 fighter between ship and wharf before heading back to Point Cook, only to be hauled into Cole's office the next morning to find the CO brandishing a photograph taken by a member of the public, catching the young pilot in the act. Sent for a dressing down to the Air Member for Personnel, Group Captain Jimmy Goble, Scherger was forced to admit it was not the first time he had engaged in such stunts. Goble responded, "Good, I'm glad to see we've still got a few in the Air Force with spirit."

=== 1930s: Flying instructor to Director of Training ===
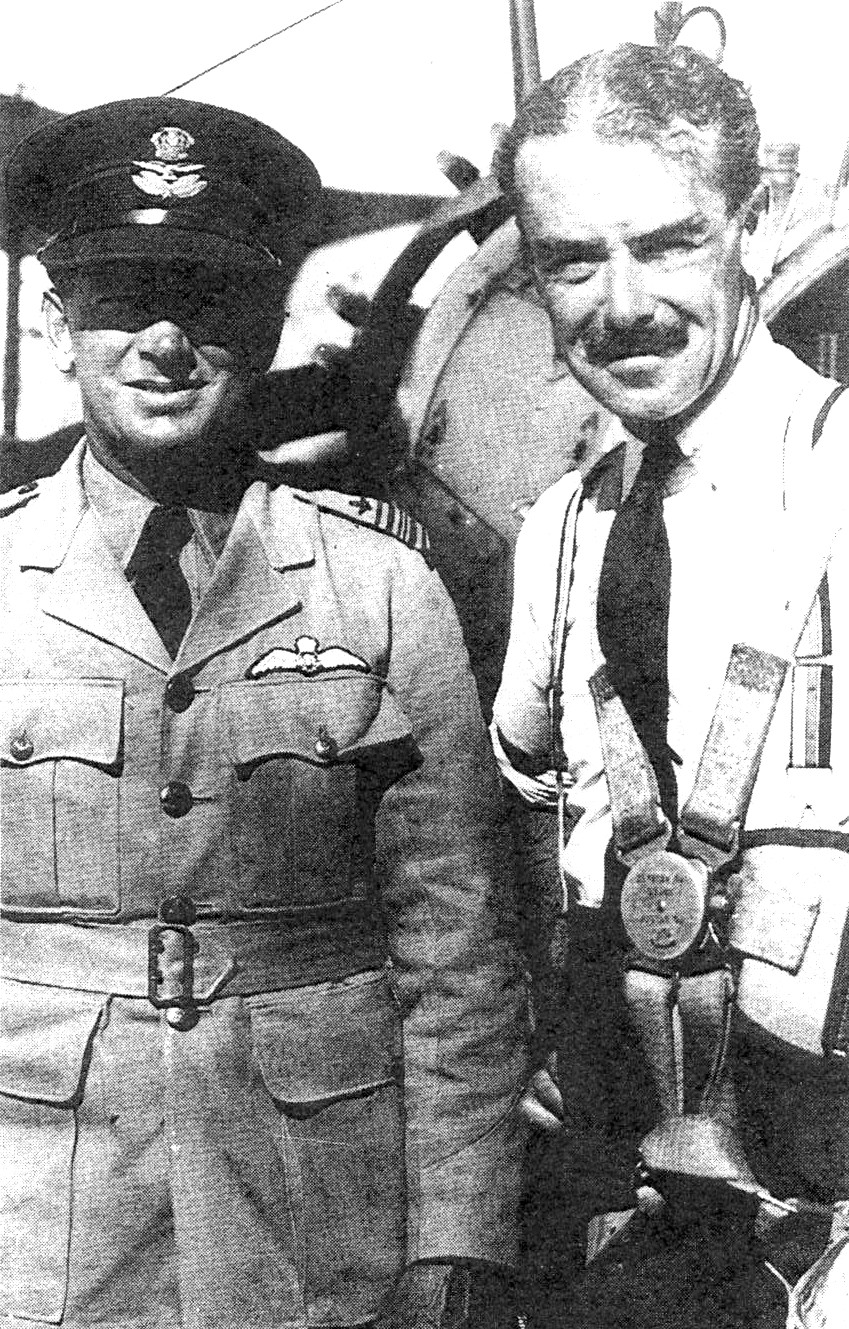
Squadron Leader Scherger (left) with Federal Treasurer Richard Casey at Point Cook, 1937

By the 1930s, as a flight instructor and test pilot, Scherger was, according to historian Alan Stephens, "perhaps the RAAF's outstanding aviator". He married Thelma Harrick on 1 June 1929; they had a daughter. Promoted to flight lieutenant on 1 June 1929, Scherger became chief flying instructor (CFI) at Point Cook that August. He also flew with Fighter Squadron, a unit of No. 1 FTS operating Bristol Bulldogs. As one of the leading pilots of the Bulldog, then regarded as the peak of military technology, and in what was generally thought of as the RAAF's elite formation, he gained popular exposure that may have helped his later rise to senior leadership. In October 1931, he won an Aero Club derby at Adelaide in a Bulldog, clocking a top speed of 160.98 mph (259.07 km/h).

In August 1934, Scherger was posted to England to study at RAF Staff College, Andover. Just prior to departing, he was involved in a notorious incident at RAAF Station Laverton. A squadron leader arrived home early from a mess function to find his wife sleeping with another officer, who escaped by crashing through the bedroom window. The squadron leader then pursued his wife with a loaded revolver, the pair eventually arriving at Scherger's quarters. Faced with the frightened woman and the enraged husband crying that he would "shoot the bitch", Scherger knocked the man down with a poker. The unconscious husband was placed in the guardhouse, and the woman given shelter off the base; the officer she had slept with promptly resigned his commission.

Scherger graduated from Andover in December 1935 and subsequently completed courses at the RAF's School of Air Navigation and Central Flying School. He was promoted to squadron leader on 1 July 1936. Returning to Australia, he resumed his position as CFI at Point Cook in May 1937. As directed by the Federal government, he was responsible for training the Treasurer, Richard Casey, to fly; the use of Air Force facilities for his own benefit by an elected official led to adverse publicity when it was revealed by the media. In September, Scherger test flew the North American NA-16 at Laverton; the evaluation program led to the design being adapted as the CAC Wirraway the following year. He was appointed Director of Training at RAAF Headquarters, Melbourne, in January 1938, and promoted to wing commander on 1 March 1939.

== World War II ==
=== 1939–1942: Outbreak of war to raid on Darwin ===
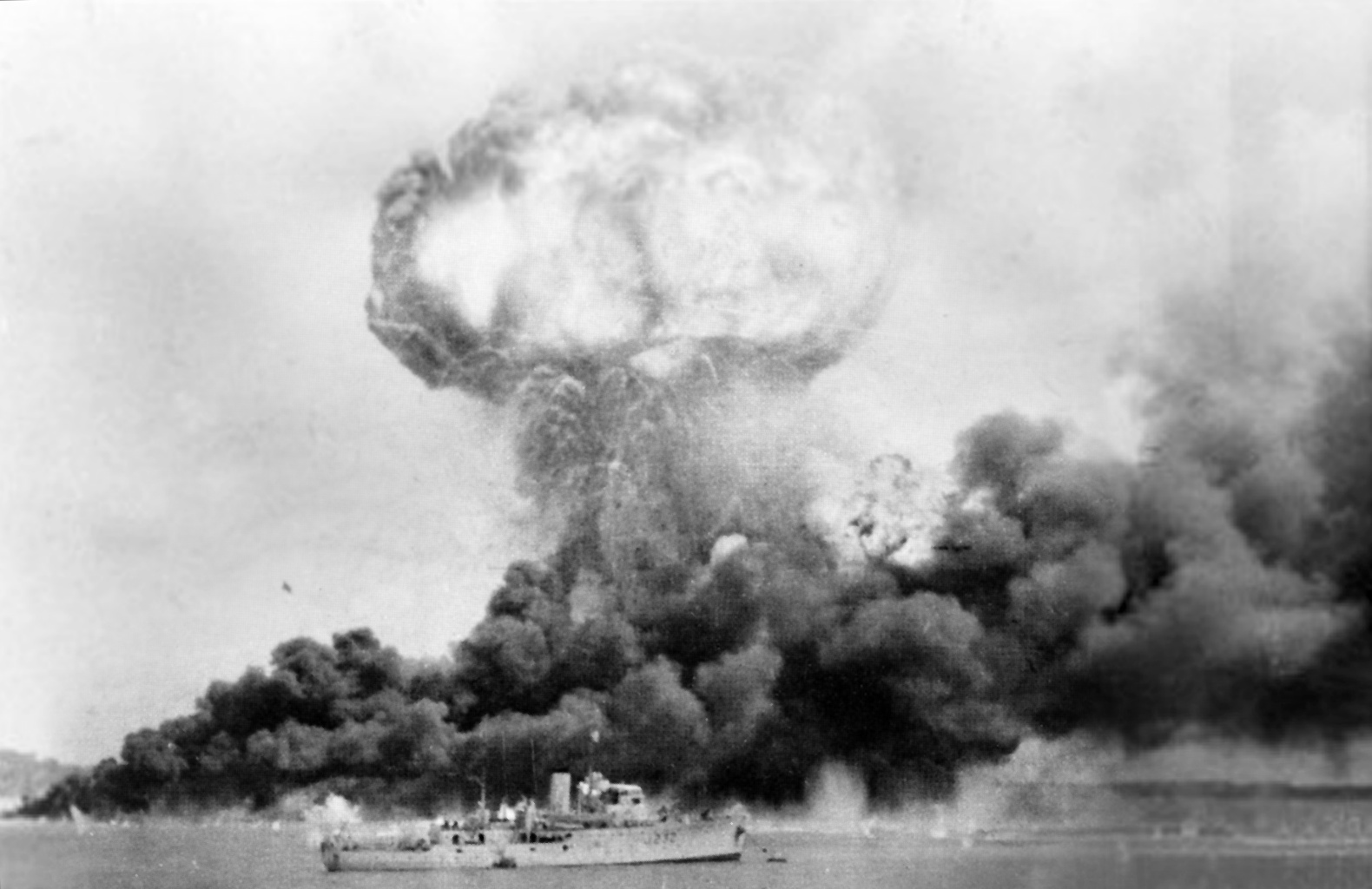
Explosion of an oil storage tank during the first air raid on Darwin, 19 February 1942

As Director of Training at the outbreak of World War II, Scherger's main challenge was to expand the RAAF's pool of flying instructors. Central Flying School, Australia's first military aviation unit, was re-formed for this purpose in April 1940. Awarded the Air Force Cross in June 1940 for his "outstanding ability" as a pilot and instructor, he took charge of No. 2 Service Flying Training School near Wagga the following month, and was promoted to temporary group captain on 1 September. In October 1941, he was made commanding officer of RAAF Station Darwin, Northern Territory. Described by Major General Lewis H. Brereton, commander of the US Far East Air Force, as "energetic, efficient and very impatient", Scherger started improving the operational readiness of the base and its surrounds without waiting for specific orders from RAAF Headquarters. The following January, he was appointed senior air staff officer to Air Commodore Douglas Wilson, Air Officer Commanding (AOC) of North-Western Area Command (NWA), which administered RAAF Station Darwin and other airfields in the Northern Territory and north-west Western Australia.

In Wilson's absence at ABDA Command Headquarters in Java, Scherger was acting AOC NWA on 19 February 1942 when Darwin suffered its first aerial attacks by the Japanese. Driving into town to meet Air Marshal Richard Williams, who was in transit on his way to England, Scherger first became aware of the assault after he heard anti-aircraft fire and counted twenty-seven enemy aircraft in the distance. He arrived at the civil airfield to witness a Curtiss P-40 crash land on the runway, before his car was strafed by fighters. In a lull after the initial attack that day, he made contact with Williams before the two men were forced to take shelter in a makeshift trench that was straddled by falling bombs as a second raid got under way. Afterwards, Scherger began to restore order and launched a Hudson light bomber on a reconnaissance mission, though there was no further contact with Japanese forces.

I was unemployed for one month, which isn't very encouraging in the middle of a war.

— Fred Scherger on his removal from North-Western Area Command in the wake of the February 1942 air raids

As well as the loss of civil and military infrastructure, twenty-three aircraft and ten ships, and the death of some 250 people, 278 RAAF personnel had deserted Darwin in an exodus that became known as the "Adelaide River Stakes". "There was", in Scherger's words, "an awful panic and a lot of men simply went bush". Praised for his "great courage and energy", he was one of the few senior Air Force officers in the region to emerge from Commissioner Charles Lowe's inquiry into the debacle with his long-term career prospects undamaged. In the immediate aftermath, though, his outspoken criticism of the RAAF's state of preparedness alienated members of the Air Board, the service's controlling body that consisted of its most senior officers and which was chaired by the Chief of the Air Staff (CAS). He was relieved of his position at NWA by the CAS, Air Chief Marshal Sir Charles Burnett, and shunted through a series of postings for the remainder of the year, including commanding officer at RAAF Station Richmond, supernumerary at RAAF Headquarters, Director of Defence at Allied Air Forces Headquarters, South West Pacific Area, and Director of Training at RAAF Headquarters. Seeking restitution, he boldly went over the heads of the Air Board and successfully appealed to the Minister for Air, Arthur Drakeford, supported by Commissioner Lowe.

=== 1943–1945: No. 10 Operational Group and First Tactical Air Force ===
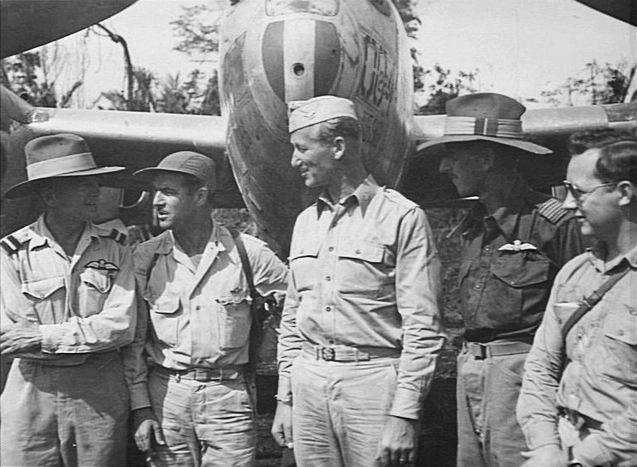
Air Commodore Scherger (left) with USAAF Brigadier General Paul Wurtsmith (second left) on 24 April 1944, after the landings at Aitape

Scherger served as Officer Commanding No. 2 Training Group at RAAF Station Wagga from July 1943 until he was appointed AOC of the newly formed No. 10 Operational Group (No. 10 OG) in November. The Air Force's main mobile strike force, No. 10 OG at its formation consisted of No. 77 Wing, operating A-31 Vengeance dive bombers, and No. 78 Wing, operating P-40 Kittyhawk fighters, as well as several ancillary units. Promoted to acting air commodore on 25 January 1944, Scherger established his headquarters at Nadzab, Papua New Guinea, in support of the US Fifth Air Force. Though able to launch No. 78 Wing's first mission that same month, he had to deal with several organisational problems to bring all his squadrons to combat readiness, including lack of training in tropical conditions, and shortcomings in aircraft maintenance and staff rotation that resulted in the RAAF's operational rate of effort being inferior to similar USAAF formations. These issues were overcome later in the year and No. 10 OG units began exceeding the rate of effort of their American counterparts.

By March 1944, No. 77 Wing's Vengeances had been withdrawn from operations due to their inferiority to newer equipment. Three squadrons from No. 9 Operational Group—one each flying Bostons, Beaufighters, and Beauforts—were assigned to the Wing as replacements, but No. 10 OG itself was moved from Nadzab to Cape Gloucester to permit USAAF units with longer-ranged aircraft to occupy vital airfields on the Allied front line. The group's disappointment with its withdrawal from Nadzab was tempered by news that it was to take part in the forthcoming attack on Aitape, New Guinea, codenamed Operation Reckless. Scherger was appointed air commander for the assault, leading US and Australian units. No. 78 Wing's Kittyhawks shadowed the main task force while heavier aircraft from NWA conducted bombing and mining sorties to indirectly support the operation. The landings on 22 April 1944 met little opposition, credited in part to the Allied bombardment in the days leading up to it. With elements of No. 10 OG going ashore on the first day, Aitape airfield was repaired and No. 78 Wing was operating from it within three days. In June, Scherger was named commander of Australian and US air forces for the attack on Noemfoor Island. Over the course of the battle that commenced on 2 July, he controlled Nos. 71, 77, 78 and 81 Wings RAAF, as well as the USAAF's 58th and 348th Fighter Groups and 307th and 417th Bombardment Groups. Scherger was promoted to temporary air commodore on 1 August, and was awarded the Distinguished Service Order for his actions at Aitape and Noemfoor, the citation noting that he "operated his air forces with great skill and success" and praising the way he placed himself "in the forefront of the landing of the ground troops", where "his personal courage and leadership proved an inspiration to all personnel".

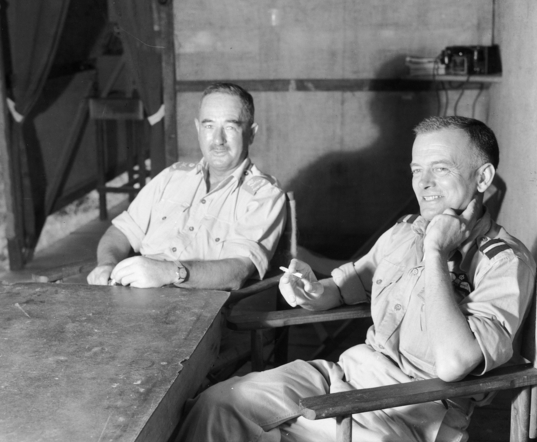
Scherger (right) with Lieutenant General Leslie Morshead in Labuan, August 1945

A jeep accident in August left Scherger with a fractured pelvis, necessitating his evacuation to Australia for rehabilitation. In his absence, Air Commodore Harry Cobby took command of No. 10 OG; two months later the formation was redesignated the Australian First Tactical Air Force (No. 1 TAF). Still recuperating, Scherger acted in the role of Air Member for Personnel at RAAF Headquarters, Melbourne, from January to May 1945. On 10 May, he was posted back to the Pacific to resume control of No. 1 TAF following Cobby's dismissal in the wake of the "Morotai Mutiny". He returned as Operation Oboe One, the Battle of Tarakan, was under way; No. 1 TAF's airfield construction teams had been tasked with opening the runway on Tarakan Island within a week of Allied landings but extensive pre-invasion damage and adverse environmental conditions delayed this until the end of June. He then led No. 1 TAF in Operation Oboe Six, the invasion of Labuan, going ashore on the afternoon of the landings on 10 June to establish his command post. By July, when the final Allied offensive of the Borneo Campaign took place as Operation Oboe Two in Balikpapan, No. 1 TAF had reached a strength of some 25,000 personnel; by the end of hostilities on 14 August this figure had been reduced with the transfer of units to the recently formed No. 11 Group.

== Post-war career ==
=== 1946–1957: Rise to Chief of the Air Staff ===
In October 1945, Scherger led a survey team to Japan to review airfields and other facilities being considered for the British Commonwealth Occupation Force, determining that substantial work was needed to bring them up to the required capacity. The following year, he attended the Imperial Defence College, London. He was promoted to substantive group captain on 1 January 1947, and was appointed Deputy Chief of the Air Staff (DCAS) on 1 July. Scherger was raised to substantive air commodore on 23 September 1948, and promoted to temporary air vice marshal on 1 May 1950. He was appointed a Commander of the Order of the British Empire (CBE) in the King's Birthday Honours the same year. As DCAS, Scherger reported to Air Marshal George Jones, whose ten-year term as CAS would the longest of any incumbent in the position. The pair enjoyed a cordial working relationship, and Jones earmarked the younger officer as a leader of the future. Scherger could not persuade his conservative chief to revamp the Air Force from its wartime area command structure into a more modern service organised along functional lines; this radical change would await Jones' successor, Air Marshal Sir Donald Hardman.

You always got a straight answer from Scherger, even when you didn't like it. He was very pro-Australian, and why not?

— Major General Sir William Oliver, Chief of Staff to General Sir Gerald Templer, Malaya

After completing his tour as DCAS in July 1951, Scherger was posted to Washington, D.C., to head up the Australian Joint Services Staff. He was promoted to substantive air vice marshal on 1 July 1952. On 1 January 1953 he succeeded Air Vice Marshal George Mills as AOC of RAF Air Headquarters Malaya. In this role, Scherger commanded all Commonwealth air forces in the region and was responsible for operations against communist guerrillas during the emergency. Scherger deliberately sited his headquarters, which had been based in Singapore when he took over, next to the offices of the Director of Operations in Kuala Lumpur, to more closely align air tasking with overall military planning. He expanded the use of helicopters for troop delivery and casualty evacuation, and presided over a change in tactics that saw an earlier policy of indiscriminate saturation bombing of jungle areas replaced by one of precision strike against enemy camps. He also pioneered psychological warfare in the form of "voice" aircraft broadcasting propaganda, close cooperation between light aircraft spotters and ground forces to aid bombing missions, and defoliation to clear jungle cover.

Appointed a Companion of the Order of the Bath on 30 April 1954 for his service in Malaya, Scherger joined the Air Board as Air Member for Personnel in March 1955. During his term he commissioned a review into the effectiveness of the syllabus at RAAF College for meeting the future needs of the Air Force in an age of missiles and nuclear weaponry. This led to a policy of cadets undertaking academic degrees, in line with similar institutions in the other armed services; the College was subsequently renamed RAAF Academy. Promoted air marshal, he became Chief of the Air Staff on 19 March 1957, succeeding Air Marshal Sir John McCauley. Long identified as a strong contender for the RAAF's senior role, Scherger was described by Air Marshal Hardman as "easily the best material on offer". He declared that as an administrator he was "not going to allow myself to be bogged down with minor matters of detail ... Broad policy comes from the top. These decisions have to be implemented in the commands—and that's the way it's going to be."

=== 1957–1961: Chief of the Air Staff ===
As CAS, one of Scherger's first tasks was investigating the feasibility of a nuclear arsenal for the Air Force. During visits to Britain and the US he explored the possibility of weapons being delivered by the RAAF's Sabre fighters or its Canberra bombers. In 1958, he held discussions with the Chief of Staff of the USAF, General Thomas D. White, about storing nuclear weapons in Australia under USAF control. In 1959 and 1960, Scherger had information sent out, including manuals and maintenance instructions, regarding equipping the Canberras with Mark 7 nuclear bombs, the same type that the British Canberras used. For a time, Scherger championed the purchase of a force of British-built Vulcan heavy bombers but excessive cost and a governmental determination to remain "under the shelter of the American nuclear umbrella" put paid to the proposal. Instead, in 1963, the decision was taken to purchase the General Dynamics F-111 swing-wing bomber "on the understanding that it could carry nuclear weapons".

Turning to fighters, Scherger succeeded in reversing a publicly announced decision to purchase the F-104 Starfighter as a replacement for the Sabre, in favour of the Dassault Mirage III, a type better suited for Australia's requirements. During trials he had taken the controls of a Starfighter, reportedly becoming the first Australian to fly at twice the speed of sound. He was appointed Knight Commander of the Order of the British Empire (KBE) in the 1958 Queen's Birthday Honours.

An advocate of helicopters since his experience in Malaya, Scherger influenced purchase of the UH-1 Iroquois for Australia. He also played a key role in the acquisition of the C-130 Hercules transport in 1958, over the Federal treasury's "bureaucratic hand-wringing"; the type soon proved itself vital to defence force activity in the region, being described as second only to the F-111 as "the most significant aircraft the RAAF has ever operated". The following year, harking back to his experience in 1942, Scherger proposed a second airfield in the Darwin area, which led eventually to the establishment of RAAF Base Tindal near Katherine. He transferred funding already in place for extension of the runway at Laverton to effect this, signalling a fundamental shift in the Air Force's "centre of gravity" to the north of Australia. The first edition of RAAF News (now Air Force News), which had been sponsored by Scherger, appeared in January 1960 and carried a message from the CAS concerning current defence policy, as well as announcing that Sidewinder air-to-air missiles would begin equipping the Air Force's Sabres. Scherger also oversaw introduction of Bloodhound surface-to-air missiles to the RAAF's arsenal. Towards the end of his term as CAS, he expressed interest in Britain's supersonic BAC TSR-2 as a replacement for the Canberra, but noted that it was "many years" from production.

=== 1961–1966: Chairman of the Chiefs of Staff Committee ===
Scherger became Chairman of the Chiefs of Staff Committee (COSC), the senior Australian military position at the time, in May 1961, taking over from Vice Admiral Sir Roy Dowling. Keen as ever to see a supersonic bomber replace the Canberra, he visited Britain in April 1963 to investigate progress of the TSR-2. Using back-channel sources of information, he satisfied himself that the RAF's pronouncements on the bomber's development were overly optimistic, and later that year began supporting selection of the F-111 as the aircraft best suited to supplant the Canberra.

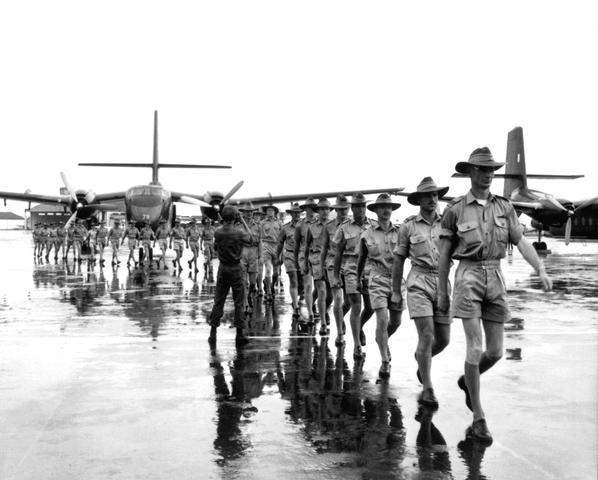
RAAF Caribous and personnel on arrival in South Vietnam, August 1964

During the Indonesia–Malaysia Konfrontasi, Scherger acted as military liaison between the British and Australian governments. Openly sceptical about the cease-fire announced by President Sukarno on 25 January 1964, he supported British requests for Australian combat forces in Borneo but was in the short term "overruled by 'political cross-currents'". Towards the end of the year, he advocated bombing Indonesian air bases using RAAF Canberras in Malaya, but in this instance the British held back. Although Australia eventually deployed battalions of the Royal Australian Regiment from March 1965, Scherger's earlier optimistic estimation of the speed and level of his government's readiness to commit troops was said to have confused the British.

The latter part of Scherger's tour as Chairman COSC coincided with the beginning of large-scale Australian involvement in the Vietnam War. By mid-1964, Australia had already sent a small team of military advisors, plus a detachment of newly acquired DHC-4 Caribou transports, to the region at the request of the South Vietnamese government. At a joint US, Australian and New Zealand conference from 30 March to 1 April 1965, and with instructions only to ascertain America's objectives in the conflict, Scherger indicated that Australia would be prepared to commit a sizeable ground force, of around battalion size. Within a week, Prime Minister Robert Menzies' Federal cabinet had ratified the proposal, which was formally announced on 19 April. The 1st Battalion, Royal Australian Regiment deployed to Vietnam in May 1965, and two squadrons of the RAAF were committed by mid-1966. With the formation of Australian Forces Vietnam (AFV) at this time, Scherger recommended that Air Force units effectively serve under Army control "to convey an image of all Australian forces fighting together, as one unit". The Minister for Air, Peter Howson, felt that this made Scherger and the Army guilty of "exaggerated national pride".

Promoted to air chief marshal on 25 March 1965, Scherger became not only the first RAAF officer to attain four-star rank, but also the first Duntroon graduate to do so. Already considered "a particularly assertive Chairman" of COSC, his role was further strengthened by the promotion as he now out-ranked the three service heads. His predecessors in the position had not advanced beyond three-star rank. Scherger remained as chairman until retiring from military life on 18 May 1966, having twice had his term extended by unanimous vote of Federal cabinet.

== Later life ==
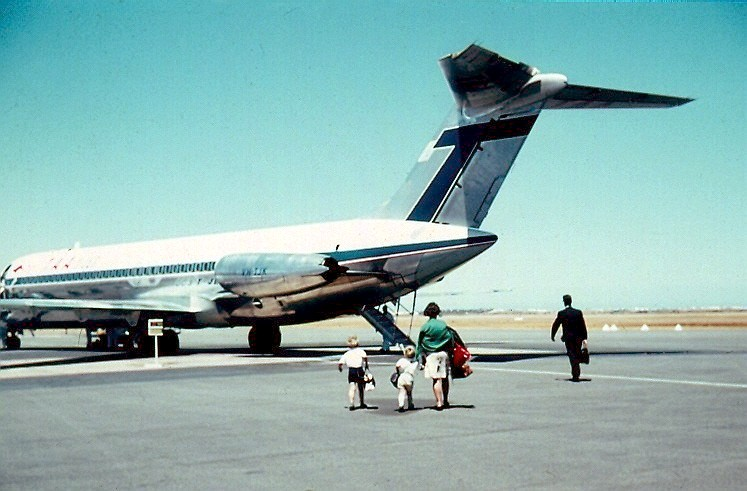
TAA DC-9 at Adelaide Airport, 1967

After leaving the military, Scherger became chairman of the Australian National Airlines Commission (ACAC), the controlling body of the Federal government's domestic carrier Trans Australia Airlines (TAA), on 1 July 1966. Considered as bringing to TAA "the dash and leadership the new air age demanded", he presided over delivery of its first Douglas DC-9 twin-jet transport in 1967. The government's Two Airlines Policy, designed to ensure even competition between TAA and Australia's private domestic carrier, Ansett, meant that the decision of which airline would land the first DC-9 in the country came down to the toss of a coin, which Scherger won. He augmented his role at ACAC with chairmanship of the Commonwealth Aircraft Corporation (CAC) from 1968, and joined an Australian defence industries mission to the US the following year.

Scherger continued to lead ACAC and CAC until retiring to live in Melbourne in 1975. He also served as director on the boards of other firms including electronics companies Plessey Pacific and International Computers (Australia) Limited. His wife Thelma died in a car accident in 1974. On 3 March 1975, aged seventy, he married Joy Robertson, a widow he had known three months. At the time, he was quoted as saying, "In the Air Force you have to move quickly or someone else will shoot you down". In retirement he attracted some controversy by continuing to advocate for the Australian military to acquire a nuclear capability. Scherger died in Kew, Melbourne, on 16 January 1984, having been ill following a stroke the previous year. He was given a military funeral with a flypast, and cremated.

== Legacy ==
Scherger was the first to go to the CAS post with a bit of class; the others approached it in a registered, a pedestrian fashion. There was a strain of ruthlessness in Scherger; he would not spare you if his interests and yours conflicted.

— Air Vice Marshal Ellis Wackett

Described by Alan Stephens as one of "the outstanding officers of the post-war era" and "among the RAAF's better chiefs", Scherger is credited with helping to shift Australia's defence posture to the north by developing the concept of a series of front-line air bases in the continent's top end, beginning with plans for RAAF Tindal in 1959. From the time of his command of No. 10 Operational Group, he had an easy rapport—and worked to foster relations—with the US military, presaging closer defence ties with the Americans that he pursued as CAS. Among other things this manifested itself in the purchase of more and more US equipment for the Air Force, and far less from the United Kingdom. Once elevated to the position of Chairman of COSC, he further severed ties with Britain by removing senior Royal Australian Navy officers from the Royal Navy List, and dropping the words "... and Chief of the Australian Section of the Imperial General Staff" from the title of Chief of the General Staff in the Australian Army List.

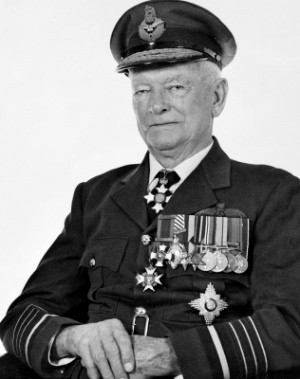
Air Chief Marshal Sir Frederick Scherger KBE, CB, DSO, AFC

As Chairman of COSC, Scherger played a leading role in the large-scale commitment of Australian forces to Vietnam. In an address at the Australian War Memorial in 2005, journalist Paul Kelly referred to him as "Australia's most prominent military hawk" at the time, who "exceeded his brief" by promising a battalion to the Americans before a formal request had been made. Historians Peter Edwards and Gregory Pemberton have written that "no official could have done more to press Australia into a military commitment in Vietnam than its most highly ranked serviceman, Air Chief Marshal Scherger". Reflecting later on Australia's involvement in the war, Scherger said "If you want allies, you've got to support allies ... It was never conceivable to us that America could lose—no way."

Along with Athol Townley, Minister for Defence from 1958 to 1963, Scherger urged the establishment of an Australian Joint Services Staff College (JSSC), to further inter-service knowledge and cooperation against an indigenous background instead of sending officers to overseas colleges; the JSSC opened in 1970 as the Joint Services Wing of a proposed Australian Services Staff College, later being subsumed by the Australian Defence College. Scherger was also an early advocate for "one Australian Defence Force" comprising three branches, under one Minister for Defence, rather than three competing services, each with its own minister. According to his biographer, Harry Rayner, he bequeathed to his successor as Chairman of COSC, Lieutenant General Sir John Wilton, a position much invigorated and respected by the service chiefs and the government, and contributing to a more cohesive Australian defence organisation. In 1973, the single-service ministries were abolished in favour of an all-encompassing Department of Defence; by 1984, the Chairman COSC position had evolved to become the Chief of the Defence Force, directly commanding all three armed services through their respective chiefs.

Rayner described Scherger as "the most quoted and best known of contemporary military leaders" in Australia from 1957 to 1966, recognised and admired by civilian and soldier alike. Detractors accused him of cunning and excessive politicking, Air Marshal Williams declaring that Scherger favoured his friends in the service and later in TAA and CAC, and Prime Minister John Gorton famously calling him "a politician in uniform". Scherger was also labelled a self-publicist, but argued "... you can't sell your ideas unless you can sell yourself, and if you can sell yourself you're half way to selling the ideas that you've got". The newest of the northern air bases he proposed while CAS, near Weipa in Cape York, was opened in 1998 and named RAAF Base Scherger in his honour. His name is also borne by Sir Frederick Scherger Drive in North Turramurra, New South Wales.

== Notes ==
Military offices
Preceded by Squadron Leader John McCauley	Director of Training; 1938–1940	Succeeded by Group Captain George Jones
Preceded by Air Commodore John McCauley	Deputy Chief of the Air Staff; 1947–1951	Succeeded by Air Vice Marshal Valston Hancock
Preceded by Air Vice Marshal George Mills	RAF Air Headquarters Malaya; 1953–1955	Succeeded by Air Vice Marshal Wallace Kyle
Preceded by Air Vice Marshal William Hely	Air Member for Personnel; 1955–1957	Succeeded by Air Commodore Frank Headlam
Preceded by Air Marshal Sir John McCauley	Chief of the Air Staff; 1957–1961	Succeeded by Air Marshal Sir Valston Hancock
Preceded by Vice Admiral Sir Roy Dowling	Chairman Chiefs of Staff Committee; 1961–1966	Succeeded by General Sir John Wilton

Ribbon	Description	Date
	Knight Commander of the Order of the British Empire (KBE)	1958
	Commander of the Order of the British Empire (CBE)	1950
	Companion of the Order of the Bath (CB)	1954
	Distinguished Service Order (DSO)	1944
	Air Force Cross (UK) (AFC)	1940
	1939–45 Star	1939–1945
	Pacific Star	1939–1945
	Defence Medal	1939–1945
	War Medal 1939–1945	1939–1945
	Australia Service Medal	1939–1945
	General Service Medal, Malaya	1952
	Queen Elizabeth II Coronation Medal	1953
