= 1TAF =

1TAF may refer to:

- Australian First Tactical Air Force
- Desert Air Force, also known as the First Tactical Air Force
