= Morotai Mutiny =

1945 incident involving Royal Australian Air Force pilots

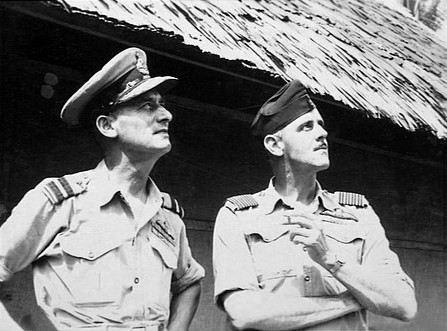
Air Commodore Cobby (left) and Group Captain Caldwell at Morotai in January 1945

The "Morotai Mutiny" was an incident in April 1945 involving members of the Australian First Tactical Air Force based on the island of Morotai, in the Dutch East Indies. Eight senior pilots, including Australia's leading flying ace, Group Captain Clive Caldwell, tendered their resignations to protest what they perceived as the relegation of Royal Australian Air Force (RAAF) fighter squadrons to strategically unimportant ground attack missions against Japanese positions that had been bypassed in the Allies' "island-hopping" campaign. A government investigation vindicated the "mutineers", and three high-ranking officers at First Tactical Air Force Headquarters, including the commander, Air Commodore Harry Cobby, the Australian Flying Corps' top-scoring ace in World War I, were relieved of their posts.

George Odgers summed up the cause of the incident in the official history of the RAAF in World War II as "the conviction of a group of young leaders that they were engaging in operations that were not militarily justifiable—a conviction widely shared also by many Australian soldiers and political leaders." Odgers concluded that the ensuing inquiry "made it clear that almost everyone concerned acted from the highest motives, and was convinced that, in the crisis, he acted wisely".

== Background ==
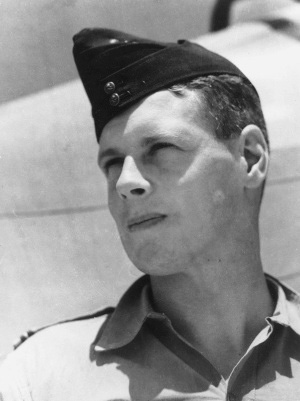
Group Captain Wilf Arthur, pictured in 1941

First Tactical Air Force (No. 1 TAF), commanded by Air Commodore Harry Cobby, was the main frontline combat formation of the RAAF in 1944–45. It fell under the operational control of United States Army Air Forces (USAAF) Lieutenant General George Kenney, the Allied air forces commander in the South West Pacific Area under General Douglas MacArthur. Initially made up of one Bristol Beaufighter and two P-40 Kittyhawk wings, No. 1 TAF was augmented in 1945 by No. 80 Wing, commanded by Group Captain Clive Caldwell. This wing comprised three Supermarine Spitfire squadrons, whose pilots included veterans of the North African Campaign and the defence of Northern Australia against Japanese air raids.

By early 1945, Japanese air power in the South West Pacific had been virtually destroyed. US Army forces were focused on completing the recapture of the Philippines as a stepping stone to an invasion of Japan. During this time, Australian forces including No. 1 TAF were increasingly assigned to garrison duties and harassing Japanese bases on islands bypassed by MacArthur's forces. The Chief of the Air Staff, Air Vice Marshal George Jones, would later contend that the RAAF, in the words of Air Force historian Alan Stephens, "was 'side-stepped' out of the final victory over Japan by MacArthur, who wanted all the glory for himself". US Marine Corps aviators from the Air North Solomons command also believed that MacArthur's headquarters was favouring the USAAF in the assignment of combat duties.

The overall situation led to dissatisfaction and poor morale among No. 1 TAF personnel based on Morotai, particularly the Spitfire pilots who had little opportunity for the air-to-air combat they specialised in and whose aircraft were ill-suited to ground attack missions. Group Captain Wilf Arthur, former Officer Commanding No. 81 Wing and now in charge of the Kittyhawk-equipped No. 78 Wing of No. 1 TAF, became concerned that his units' expenditure in terms of men, machines and ordnance was not justified by the damage inflicted on enemy targets or by the relative importance of those targets. In December 1944 he asked his intelligence staff to produce a "balance sheet" to quantify losses versus results. Arthur presented the balance sheet to Cobby, who reviewed it and disseminated it to his headquarters staff, but took no further action.

== Prelude ==
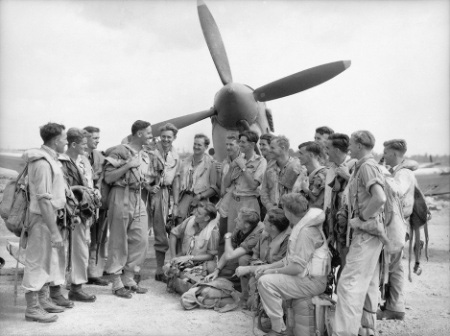
Caldwell (fourth from left) talking to No. 452 Squadron Spitfire pilots at Morotai in January 1945

In March 1945, frustrated by the lack of response from Cobby and his staff and convinced that operations were becoming even more wasteful, Arthur began discussing his concerns with other senior No. 1 TAF pilots. First, he spoke to Wing Commander Kenneth Ranger, a senior staff officer who had served with No. 9 Operational Group and had made allegations regarding the leadership of its commander, Air Commodore Joe Hewitt, who was eventually dismissed from his post. Arthur sought out Ranger as someone with "moral guts", who would take "a stand against the type of operations we were engaged in". Next, he enlisted Caldwell's support, although Caldwell was, at the time, facing charges from Cobby over liquor trafficking which made it a risk that his involvement in a protest over operations would be misconstrued as an attempt to divert attention from the charges. Arthur believed that Caldwell "would go as far as he possibly could to back up his opinions [which] were worth a lot more than the opinions of most other people in the area".

Through Caldwell more officers joined the protest, including two other celebrated aces, Wing Commander Bobby Gibbes and Squadron Leader John Waddy, as well as Squadron Leader Bert Grace, Squadron Leader Douglas Vanderfield and, later, Squadron Leader Stuart Harpham. During a series of meetings early in April 1945, Caldwell proposed that the eight resign en masse, and the others agreed. Arthur later stated that, "I meant to make as big a fuss as I possibly could with the object of getting the position corrected ... All the same, we realised that, to lay ourselves open to any charge of mutiny, we might lessen the force of what we were doing, which was the reason we put the things in as resignations and not as any attempt to unseat people higher up."

The common factor was based on the fact that we did know each other very well; we had mutual confidence and mutual experience, which we believe has demonstrated sufficiently, to us at any rate, that the RAAF is not doing its job as it should.

— Group Captain Clive Caldwell

Arthur also attempted to secure Cobby's support for the protest. The commander of No. 1 TAF had been the Australian Flying Corps' leading ace in World War I, as Caldwell was the RAAF's in World War II. Arthur reasoned that, although Cobby was partly to blame for the morale issue, "we felt that his value to our move, because of his name with the Public, together with Group Captain Caldwell, would give us a very considerable amount of public support ... he was the prima donna of one war, and ... arm-in-arm with the prima donna of the next war, we would put up a reasonable front and attract a lot of attention in the headlines of the newspapers." Cobby refused to join in and later claimed to be unaware of the depth of feeling among the pilots.

== "Mutiny" ==
I will leave these applications on the table and if you pick them up, all records and all notes of any of this affair will be expunged from Air Force records and files and nothing will be heard about it.

— Air Vice Marshal Bill Bostock, quoted by Squadron Leader John Waddy

On 20 April 1945, the eight pilots presented Cobby with identically worded letters under the heading, "APPLICATION FOR RESIGNATION OF COMMISSION." The letters read, "I hereby respectfully make application that I be permitted to resign my Commission as an officer in the Royal Australian Air Force, forthwith." Cobby appeared taken aback and would not accept the resignations. He spoke to seven of the pilots individually, but not Caldwell, as he was already under charge. When the men refused to withdraw the letters or elaborate on the reason for their actions, Cobby contacted his immediate superior, Air Vice Marshal Bill Bostock, head of RAAF Command, the Air Force's main operational command. Bostock arrived on Morotai the next day and interviewed the pilots, asking them to tear up the letters, without success. His methods were later construed as an attempt to "make the situation go away or to at least cover it up". The pilots' only concession to Bostock's entreaty was to resubmit their resignations with the word "forthwith" replaced by "at the end of current operations".

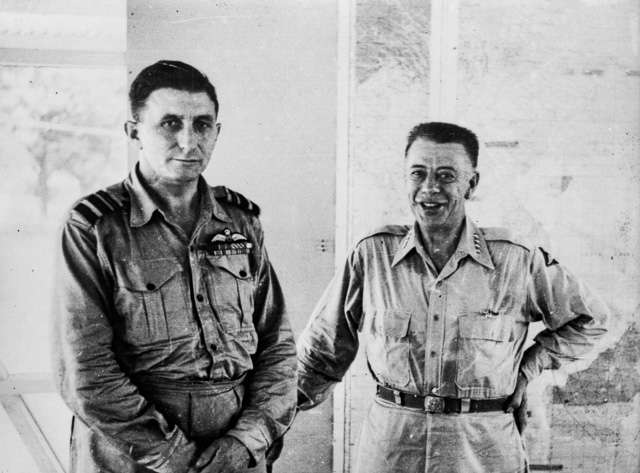
Air Vice Marshal Jones (left) and Lieutenant General Kenney (right), in July 1945

Following these interviews, Bostock advised Jones that morale in No. 1 TAF was at a "dangerously low level" and recommended that Jones fire Cobby and replace him with Air Commodore Frederick Scherger. Jones considered the pilots' action "absurd", because an officer could not legally resign during wartime, but travelled to Morotai from his headquarters in Melbourne to investigate the matter personally. He also interviewed the pilots, later declaring, "I believed them all to be sincere in what they were stating and what they had attempted to do ... Yes, sincerely held beliefs, no matter how ill-founded, coupled possibly with a rather exaggerated sense of national duty."

Kenney also became embroiled in the affair, having been informed by Bostock, and insisted on speaking directly to the pilots himself over Jones' protest that this was an internal RAAF disciplinary matter. During a visit to Morotai from his Manila headquarters, Kenney tried to persuade the officers to reconsider their positions, but again they refused. He agreed with Bostock that Cobby should be replaced by Scherger, and declared that if the pilots were court-martialled he would appear in their defence. The commander of the Australian Army's I Corps, Lieutenant General Leslie Morshead, who was at Morotai preparing for the Borneo campaign, also supported Cobby's removal. Morshead and other senior army officers were concerned that the dispute could disrupt preparations for the Australian landings in Borneo and consulted with Kenney on the matter. Jones resolved to dismiss not only Cobby but also his staff officers, Group Captains Gibson and Simms. Scherger took over as Air Officer Commanding No. 1 TAF on 10 May.

== Aftermath ==
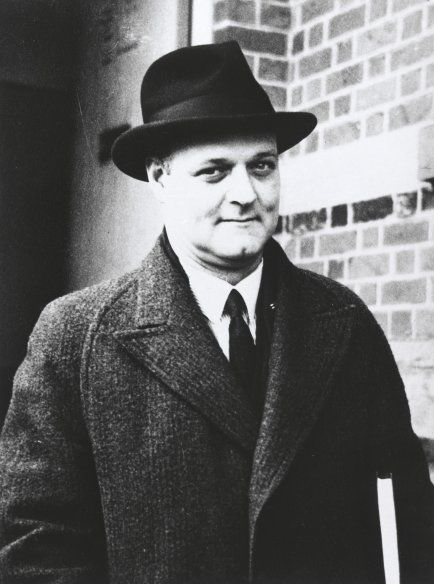
John Vincent Barry, KC

Ultimately, no court-martial took place for any actions directly related to the "mutiny", and most of the pilots involved continued on operations until the end of the war. An RAAF investigation found that Jones' removal of Cobby, Gibson and Simms was justified. Upon Jones' request, the Australian government also set up an inquiry into events on Morotai, headed by the barrister John Vincent Barry, KC. Beginning on 16 May 1945, the inquiry focused on both the resignations and the reports of illegal trafficking in alcohol between RAAF and US service personnel on the island. Though Barry's terms of reference encompassed only No. 1 TAF, the inquiry also heard evidence of shortcomings in the Air Force's higher command that may have contributed to structural and morale problems on Morotai, particularly a bitter and long-running feud between Jones and Bostock over the division of operational and administrative control of the RAAF in the Pacific.

The complete report of the inquiry was released in October, preceded by a summary of findings issued on 14 September 1945. Barry vindicated Arthur's "balance sheet" and the stand taken by the pilots, finding that their motives in tendering their resignations were sincere. No further action was taken against them over the incident itself, but Caldwell and Gibbes were court-martialled for their involvement in the alcohol racket and reduced to the rank of flight lieutenant. Barry found that Cobby had "failed to maintain proper control over his command". Cobby defended his leadership of No. 1 TAF, contending that although there was "some discontent", it was "a healthy sign of discontent amongst certain officers who wished to do more in the war than they were doing. Unfortunately, it was not within the power of 1st T.A.F. to give them that more important or more interesting work ..." The incident did not change the RAAF's role in the dying days of the war in the Pacific and may have hindered No. 1 TAF's preparations for the Battle of Tarakan. It did improve the situation on Morotai, as Scherger restored morale. The "mutineers" considered that they had achieved most of their goals by effecting a change of command in No. 1 TAF and instigating a governmental inquiry.

We did manage to change the command up there completely. One or two of them I felt sad about. Harry Cobby who was a wonderful man, he was posted. But some of the others I wasn't distressed about. But we did change the command, and that's what we set out to do.

— Wing Commander Bobby Gibbes

News of the resignations, the alcohol racket and Caldwell's court-martial were widely reported in Australia. Following publication of Barry's findings, The Daily Telegraph in Sydney commented that "the RAAF should have a complete new deal. It is a badly run show and the fault is high up". The same paper later called Caldwell's court-martial a "witch hunt". Despite this publicity, the action did not become popularly known as the "Morotai Mutiny" until years later. The phrase dated back to the earliest days of the incident, Arthur having written it at the top of an aide-mémoire. He later said that "the alliteration must have appealed to me". Shortly after writing it, he crossed out "Morotai" and added a question mark following "Mutiny". The term did not catch on with the public at the time but Arthur's original words have been credited as the source of the name.
