= No. 22 Squadron RAAF =

Royal Australian Air Force squadron

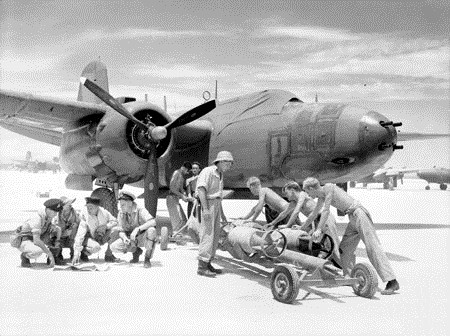
- No. 22 Squadron aircrew and ground crew preparing for a sortie in October 1944
- Active: 1936–1946; 1948–present
- Country: Australia
- Branch: Royal Australian Air Force
- Role: Base operations and training
- Size: Squadron
- Part of: Combat Support Group
- Garrison/HQ: RAAF Base Richmond
- Motto(s): Adsum

Commanders
- Honorary Colonel: Governor of New South Wales (Since 1937)
- Notable commanders: Allan Walters (1937–1938); Charles Learmonth (1943)

No. 22 (City of Sydney) Squadron is a Royal Australian Air Force (RAAF) mixed Permanent and Reserve squadron that provides support for the RAAF in the Sydney region. Formed in 1936, the squadron served in Papua New Guinea during the Second World War, and later followed the Pacific War as far as the Philippines. Following the war, the squadron was re-formed in 1948 but was converted to a non-flying support role in mid-1960. It is currently based at RAAF Base Richmond, New South Wales.

== History ==
No. 22 Squadron was formed on 20 April 1936 at Richmond, New South Wales, as part of the Citizen Air Force (CAF). Equipped with Hawker Demons and de Havilland Gipsy Moths, two-thirds of its personnel were part-time CAF members and one third belonged to the Permanent Air Force (PAF). Its first commanding officer was Squadron Leader D. E. L. Wilson. Allan Walters commanded the squadron in 1937–38, during which time it received a number of Avro Ansons.

=== Second World War ===
No. 22 Squadron was mobilised following the outbreak of war in September 1939 and conducted anti-submarine patrols. Its first operational mission came on 10 September when its aircraft undertook a search for a submarine that had been reported off Sydney. The sighting came to nothing. In late December 1940, the squadron replaced its Demons with CAC Wirraways and over the course of the next year it slowly converted completely to this type, completing this process by the time Japan entered the war in December 1941. During this time the squadron undertook anti-submarine and convoy escort tasks, but saw no action. It also provided training support for Army anti-aircraft units, towing targets for them to shoot at.

The squadron was equipped with A-20 Boston bombers in April 1942. These aircraft had originally been intended to equip Dutch forces in the East Indies, but the advance of the Japanese through Java meant that the aircraft were sent to Australia instead. As a result, they arrived without the necessary spare parts, instructions and other support equipment. This caused considerable teething problems; however, even before the conversion process was over No. 22 Squadron was called upon to undertake patrols along the eastern seaboard following the attack on Sydney Harbour in May and June 1942. Twice during June aircraft from the squadron attacked Japanese submarines, inflicting damage but failing to sink them.

It deployed to Port Moresby in New Guinea in October 1942 where it flew in support of Australian Army operations against the Japanese around Buna and Gona. Initial losses were high, partially due to malfunctioning ordnance, the premature explosion of which resulted in the loss of three aircraft in separate incidents in the space of two months. Operating in conjunction with the Beaufighter-equipped No. 30 Squadron RAAF, in December the squadron undertook several low-level attack missions, and also damaged a Japanese destroyer. In March 1943 the squadron played an important role in the Battle of the Bismarck Sea, an air-sea battle which resulted in significant losses for the Japanese. A member of the squadron, Flight Lieutenant Bill Newton, was posthumously awarded the Victoria Cross (VC) – the Commonwealth's highest military decoration – for his actions while flying a Boston on two separate missions between 16 and 18 March 1943.

In April 1943, the squadron moved to Goodenough Island, remaining there until November when they moved to Kiriwina. Operations during this time initially consisted of anti-shipping patrols and attacks around Cape Gloucester, before later being expanded to include photo reconnaissance missions and ground attack missions on targets throughout New Britain; a number of losses were experienced during this time. In March 1944, the squadron became part of No. 77 Wing, along with Nos. 30 and 31 Squadrons. In November 1944, the squadron moved once more, this time to Morotai Island. From here, the squadron conducted operations throughout the South West Pacific Area, including targets in the Philippines. Later in the month, the majority of the squadron's Bostons were badly damaged or destroyed in a Japanese bombing raid. As a result, its operations were reduced until January 1945 when it was moved to Noemfoor, in present-day Indonesia, and re-equipped with Beaufighters in January 1945.

The squadron's first operation on the new aircraft type came in mid-February when nine Beaufighters were sent to attack Tandao in the Celebes Sea. Further low level attacks followed, during which the squadron suffered a number of losses before switching to close support operations in April as part of Operation Oboe Six, the Australian landing on Tarakan. The following month, the squadron was scheduled to move to Tarakan, however, due to space and facility suitability issues the squadron's personnel were split up at this time, with the aircraft and aircrew remaining on Morotai, while the ground crew were quartered on Tarakan. They continued to fly operations right up to the end of the war in August. A total of 65 men from No. 22 Squadron were killed during the war. Its members received the following decorations: one VC, one Distinguished Service Order, 13 Distinguished Flying Crosses, two George Medals, one British Empire Medal and five Mentions in Despatches.

=== Post-war ===
Following the end of hostilities, No. 22 Squadron returned to Australia at the end of 1945 and was disbanded on 15 August 1946 at Deniliquin, New South Wales. On 19 April 1948, the squadron was reformed at Bankstown, New South Wales, as part of the CAF but with a cadre of PAF members. In November the squadron was equipped with P-51 Mustangs and de Havilland Tiger Moths. Operating out of Schofields, New South Wales, No. 22 Squadron undertook its own training and carried out various duties including air defence and naval and ground support tasks. During this time it also flew a Sikorsky S-51 Dragonfly helicopter, which it operated in the search-and-rescue role. In September 1952 it began re-equipping with de Havilland Vampire jet fighters.

In March 1953, the squadron relocated to RAAF Base Richmond. In 1956, it replaced its Vampires with Gloster Meteors. It also operated Winjeels in the training role. In June 1960, when CAF flying operations ceased, the squadron was converted to a non-flying role supporting RAAF activities in the Sydney region.

On 1 July 2010, changes to the structure of the Combat Support Group resulted in the combat support and fixed base services functions of No. 325 Expeditionary Combat Support Squadron (325 ECSS) being integrated with No. 22 Squadron's training role at Richmond and 325 ECSS being disbanded. The squadron is currently staffed by a mix of 280 Permanent and Reserve personnel.

== Battle honours ==
For its involvement during the Second World War, No. 22 Squadron was awarded the following battle honours:

- Pacific 1941–1945, New Guinea 1942–1944, Moresby 1942–1943, New Britain 1943, Markham Valley 1943–1944, Dutch New Guinea, Morotai, Borneo 1945, and Bismarck Sea.
