= Harry Cobby =

Australian fighter pilot

Arthur Henry (Harry) Cobby
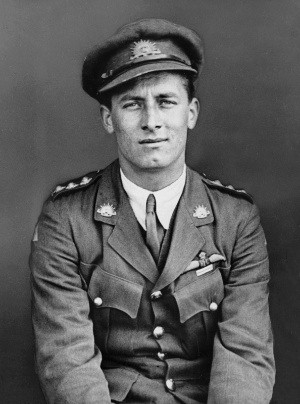
- Captain Harry Cobby in 1919
- Born: 26 August 1894; Prahran, Victoria
- Died: 11 November 1955 (aged 61); Heidelberg, Victoria
- Military career
- Allegiance: Australia
- Branch: Royal Australian Air Force
- Service years: 1912–1946
- Rank: Air Commodore
- Unit: No. 4 Squadron AFC (1917–18)
- Commands: No. 1 Squadron (1925–26); No. 3 Squadron (1930–31); North-Eastern Area Command (1942–43); First Tactical Air Force (1944–45)
- Conflicts: World War I; Western Front; German spring offensive; Battle of Amiens; World War II; South West Pacific theatre; Philippines campaign; Borneo campaign
- Awards: Commander of the Order of the British Empire; Distinguished Service Order; Distinguished Flying Cross & Two Bars; George Medal; Mentioned in Despatches; Medal of Freedom (United States)
- Other work: Department of Civil Aviation: Regional Director (1947–1954); Director, Flying Operations (1955)

Air Commodore Arthur Henry Cobby, CBE, DSO, DFC & Two Bars, GM (26 August 1894 – 11 November 1955) was an Australian military aviator. He was the leading fighter ace of the Australian Flying Corps (AFC) during World War I, despite seeing active service for less than a year.

Born and educated in Melbourne, Cobby was a bank clerk when war broke out, and was prevented by his employer from enlisting in the Australian Imperial Force until 1916. After completing flight training in England, he served on the Western Front with No. 4 Squadron AFC, operating Sopwith Camels. He was credited with 29 aerial victories, and his achievements were recognised with the Distinguished Service Order, the Distinguished Flying Cross and two bars, and a mention in despatches.

Acclaimed a national hero, Cobby transferred to the newly formed Royal Australian Air Force (RAAF) in 1921 and rose to the rank of wing commander. He left the Permanent Air Force (PAF) in 1936 to join the Civil Aviation Board, but remained in the RAAF reserve. Re-joining the PAF at the outbreak of World War II in 1939, Cobby held senior posts including Director of Recruiting and Air Officer Commanding North-Eastern Area. In 1943, he was awarded the George Medal for rescuing fellow survivors of an aircraft crash. He was appointed Air Officer Commanding No. 10 Operational Group (later Australian First Tactical Air Force) the following year, but was relieved of his post in the wake of the "Morotai Mutiny" of April 1945. Retiring from the Air Force in 1946, Cobby served with the Department of Civil Aviation until his death on Armistice Day in 1955.

== Early career ==
Arthur Henry Cobby was born in the Melbourne suburb of Prahran to Arthur Edward Stanley Cobby, a tram conductor, and his wife Alice. Known as Harry, the young Cobby completed his senior-level education at University College, Armadale, before being commissioned into the 46th Infantry Battalion (Brighton Rifles), a militia unit, in 1912. He later transferred to the 47th Infantry Battalion.

When World War I broke out, Cobby attempted to enlist in the Australian Imperial Force but his employer, the Commonwealth Bank, refused to release him as his position of clerk was considered an essential occupation. He eventually managed to join the Australian Flying Corps (AFC) on 23 December 1916, despite a professed lack of interest in flying. He became a founding member of No. 4 Squadron AFC, and embarked for England aboard RMS Omrah on 17 January 1917.

== World War I combat service ==
No. 4 Squadron arrived in England in March 1917 to undergo training in preparation for service on the Western Front. Equipped with Sopwith Camels, the unit was sent to France in December. Cobby later admitted to being so nervous about the prospect of going into battle that "if anything could have been done by me to delay that hour, I would have left nothing undone to bring it about". When he did see combat against the German Luftstreitkräfte for the first time, he had only twelve hours solo flying experience.

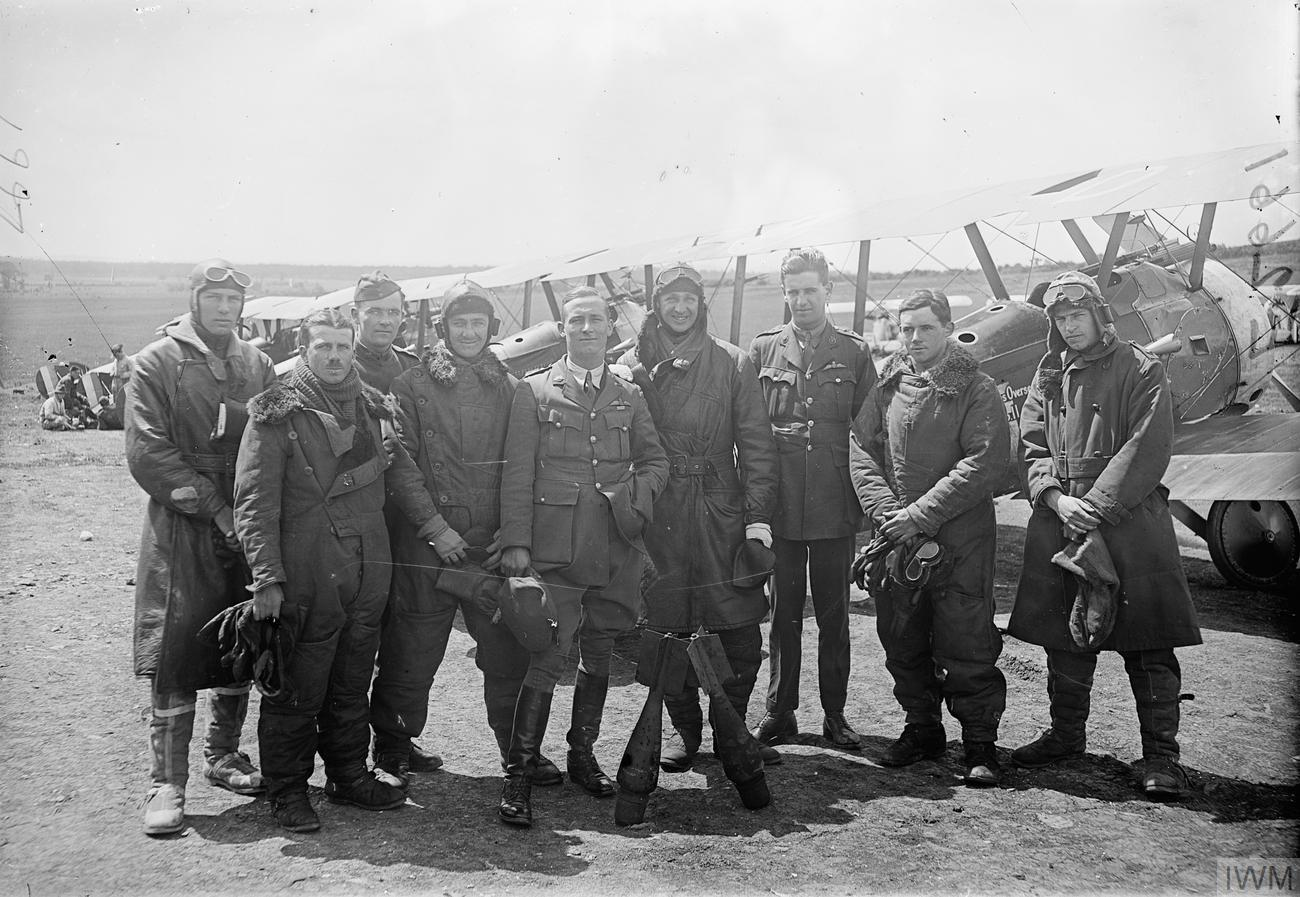
Captain Cobby (centre) with officers of A Flight, No. 4 Squadron AFC, and their Sopwith Camels on the Western Front, June 1918

Cobby claimed an early victory, over a DFW reconnaissance plane, in February 1918, but this was credited only as "driven down" and not confirmed. Based in the Pas-de-Calais area, No. 4 Squadron supported Allied forces during the German spring offensive that commenced the following month. Cobby's aerial opponents included members of Baron von Richthofen's "Flying Circus". On 21 March he shot down two of the formation's Albatros D.Vs, which were confirmed as his first official victories.

Having proved himself a talented and aggressive pilot, Cobby's leadership abilities were recognised with his appointment as a flight commander on 14 May 1918, and promotion to captain on 25 May. Described as "an imp of mischief", he personalised his Sopwith Camel by fitting it with aluminium cutouts of comic actor Charlie Chaplin. Cobby again scored two kills in one day on 30 May near Estaires, when he destroyed an Albatros and an observation balloon, and repeated this feat the next day in the same area. He had been responsible for downing No. 4 Squadron's first balloon at Merville earlier in May; although vulnerable to attack with incendiary bullets, these large observation platforms, nicknamed Drachen (Dragons), were generally well protected by enemy fighters and anti-aircraft defences, and were thus considered a dangerous but valuable target. Cobby was recommended for the Military Cross on 3 June 1918 in recognition of his combat success and for being a "bold and skilful Patrol Leader, who is setting a fine example to his Squadron". The award was changed to a Distinguished Flying Cross (DFC), appearing in the London Gazette on 2 July.

Cobby shot down three German aircraft on 28 June and was recommended for a bar to his DFC, highlighting his then-current tally of 15 victories. On 15 July 1918, he and another pilot dived on five Pfalz scouts near Armentières, Cobby accounting for two of the enemy aircraft and his companion for one. The Australians were then pursued by four Fokker Triplanes but managed to evade their attackers. This action earned Cobby a recommendation for a second bar to his DFC, the citation noting that he had scored 21 kills to date and had "succeeded in destroying so many machines by hard work and by using his brains, as well as by courage and brilliant flying". The two bars to his DFC were gazetted on the same day, 21 September. On 16 August, Cobby led a bombing raid against the German airfield at Haubourdin, near Lille, the largest aerial assault by Allied forces up until then, resulting in 37 enemy aircraft being destroyed. The following day he led a similar attack on Lomme airfield and was recommended for the Distinguished Service Order as a result. Gazetted on 2 November, the citation for the award declared that "The success of these two raids was largely due to the determined and skilful leadership of this officer".

The most successful air fighter is the most aggressive; but at the same time, a cool head and a fine sense of judgement are essential.

— Harry Cobby

By the end of his active service, Cobby was in charge of Allied formations numbering up to 80 aircraft. Fellow No. 4 Squadron ace, George Jones (later Chief of the Air Staff), described him as the unit's "natural leader in the air and in all off-duty activities"; his exploits made him a national hero. No. 4 Squadron was recognised as the most successful fighter squadron in France, accounting for as many as 220 victories. In September 1918, Cobby was transferred to a training unit in England, where he found the strain of instructing pupils "much worse than flying in France". He continued applying for a return to the front until the war ended in November, and was mentioned in despatches by Field Marshal Sir Douglas Haig the same month (gazetted 27 December). Though Cobby's final tally for the war is often given as 29 aircraft and 13 observation balloons destroyed, claim-by-claim analyses of his victories credit him with 24 aircraft and five balloons, for a grand total of 29, making him the highest-scoring member of the AFC, as well as the service's only "balloon-busting" ace. His proudest boast was that as a flight commander he never lost a pilot over enemy territory.

== Between the wars ==
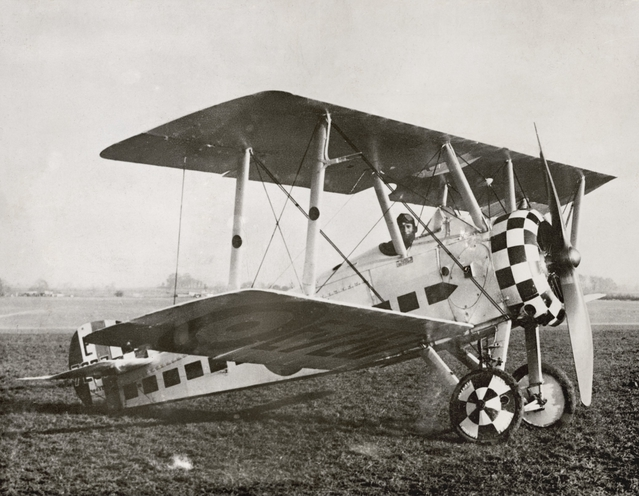
Cobby in his Sopwith Camel while instructing in England, c.1918–19. He organised the high-visibility check paint pattern himself, "not for conceit, but for safety".

Still instructing in England following the end of the war, Cobby was chosen to lead the AFC's Anzac Day flypast over London before the Prince of Wales on 25 April 1919, in concert with a parade by Australian soldiers. By 2:30 in the afternoon, he was taking his 50-strong aerial formation through a series of wild stunts over the alarmed Prince's head, and later told the story that he flew so close to the marching soldiers that their bayonets almost pierced his undercarriage. Cobby later said that this was: "probably the most foolish thing I have ever done". He returned to Australia in May 1919, and married Hilda Maude Urban in Caulfield, Victoria, on 24 April 1920; the couple had a son and a daughter. Following the disbandment of the AFC, Cobby joined the newly formed Royal Australian Air Force in 1921. Ranked flying officer (honorary flight lieutenant), he was one of the original 21 officers on the air force's strength at its formation that March. His first posting, along with most of his colleagues, was to a mixed squadron equipped primarily with S.E.5s and DH.9s at No. 1 Flying Training School, based at RAAF Point Cook. Flight Lieutenant Cobby became commanding officer (CO) of No. 1 Squadron when it was reformed at Point Cook on 1 July 1925, serving in the position until August 1926.

By 1927, Cobby had been promoted to squadron leader, and the following year went to England to attend RAF Staff College, Andover. Returning to Australia, he took over as CO of No. 3 Squadron at RAAF Station Richmond, New South Wales, from Squadron Leader Frank Lukis on 13 January 1930. At this time, the position of No. 3 Squadron commander doubled as CO of the base. Though popular with his staff, Cobby was not known for his attention to detail. In December 1930, the Chief of the Air Staff, Air Commodore Richard Williams, arrived for an inspection and found the base to be in such a state of untidiness that he ordered every man on parade and gave them what was described as "an almighty dressing down", threatening that Christmas leave would be cancelled unless the place was cleaned up. Having handed over to Squadron Leader Bill Bostock on 22 November 1931, Cobby was promoted to wing commander on 1 May 1933 and subsequently served as RAAF Director of Intelligence. In this position he headed an interdepartmental committee that was formed in August 1933 to examine the possibilities of air survey and aerial photography to further national development. The committee's findings, presented in April 1934, favoured employing government agencies for such work and ultimately led to the formation of the North Australian Survey Flight from staff and aircraft of No. 1 Squadron in April 1935. The resulting surveys of Queensland and the Northern Territory provided valuable input for the establishment of military airfields and other installations following the outbreak of World War II.

Restless in the inter-war years, Cobby retired from the Air Force to join the Civil Aviation Board as Controller of Operations in 1936; he also contributed to aviation magazines such as Australian Airmen and Popular Flying. His civil aviation duties included aircraft inspection, the issuing of licences and airworthiness certificates, maintenance of radio and meteorological services, and RAAF liaison. After the creation of a new Department of Civil Aviation in November 1938, the Civil Aviation Board was reorganised and Cobby's position was made redundant.

== World War II ==
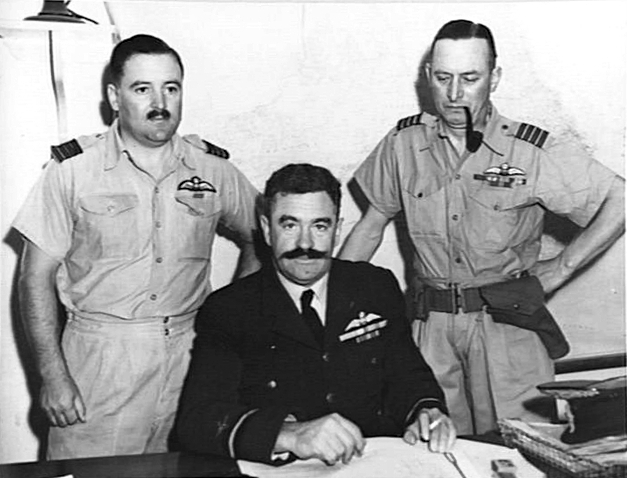
Group Captain Cobby (right) takes over North-Eastern Area from Air Commodore Frank Lukis (centre) in Townsville, Queensland, August 1942

Cobby was a member of the Citizen Air Force (RAAF reserve) during his time with the Civil Aviation Board, and rejoined the Permanent Air Force following the outbreak of World War II in September 1939. Promoted to group captain, he officially returned to active service on 25 July 1940 as Director of Recruiting, a role that traded on his public image.

On 25 August 1942, Cobby took over from Air Commodore Frank Lukis as Air Officer Commanding (AOC) North-Eastern Area in Townsville, Queensland. 1942 also saw the publication of High Adventure, Cobby's account of his experiences in World War I; the foreword was written by Air Vice Marshal Jones, newly appointed Chief of the Air Staff and fellow No. 4 Squadron veteran. Cobby was promoted to temporary air commodore in July 1943. On 7 September, he was travelling as a passenger on a Catalina flying boat when it crashed at Townsville. Although himself injured, Cobby helped rescue two other survivors, and was recommended for the George Medal for his "outstanding bravery". The award was gazetted on 10 March 1944. Cobby handed over command of North-Eastern Area in November 1943, and the following month was posted to Mount Martha, Victoria, as the Commandant of the RAAF Staff School (later RAAF Staff College), remaining in the post until he was fully recovered from his injuries. On 16 June 1944, he was appointed a Commander of the Order of the British Empire (CBE) for his conduct of air operations over New Guinea as AOC North-Eastern Area, the citation noting his "good leadership, personal example, keen understanding and continued encouragement".

In August 1944, Cobby became AOC of No. 10 Operational Group (No. 10 OG), soon to be renamed the Australian First Tactical Air Force (1st TAF). In this role he commanded 20,000 personnel in the RAAF's major mobile strike force in the South West Pacific, consisting of fighter, close support, and airfield construction units. Cobby expressed misgivings concerning the command arrangements that saw RAAF Headquarters in Melbourne responsible for No. 10 OG's administration, while its operational tasking was to be passed down through RAAF Command, the United States Thirteenth Air Force and Headquarters South West Pacific Area. He believed this required him to "try and serve two masters", a situation he found "unworkable". In the period 22–25 December 1944, 1st TAF flew 513 Kittyhawk and Beaufighter sorties against targets in Halmahera. The following month, it undertook a further 661 sorties against targets in Halmahera, Celebes, Morotai and the Vogelkop.

The 1st Tactical Air Force RAAF is now either administered or directed by RAAF Headquarters (with Forward Echelon thrown in for luck), RAAF Command, GHQ, and the Commanding General, 13th Air Force. I do not relish the role of the Duke of Plaza Toro.

— Harry Cobby, October 1944

By early 1945, Japanese air power in the South West Pacific had been virtually destroyed, and 1st TAF was increasingly assigned to garrison duties and harassing enemy bases on islands bypassed by US forces in their advance on the Philippines. During March and April, 1st TAF prepared for the invasion of Tarakan, an operation based around a mistaken judgement made by officers at Cobby's headquarters that the island's airstrip could be rapidly repaired and used to support the Borneo campaign. The relegation of fighter units to what appeared to be strategically unimportant ground attack missions led to a crisis in morale that precipitated the so-called "Morotai Mutiny" in April 1945, when eight of Cobby's senior pilots, including Australia's leading ace in the war, Group Captain Clive Caldwell, tendered their resignations in protest. Although one of the "mutineers", Group Captain Wilf Arthur, had earlier voiced his concerns to Cobby and his headquarters staff regarding the efficacy of 1st TAF's tasking, the AOC was taken aback by the resignations. He spoke to the officers individually and as a group, asking them, "Is this something against me, or having a go against me in this, because if so, if you feel that I have fallen down in my job, I will straight away ask to be recalled," to which they replied, "It has nothing to do with you." Cobby reported the incident to his immediate superior, Air Vice Marshal Bill Bostock, who informed the Chief of the Air Staff, Air Vice Marshal Jones, and the Allied Air Forces Commander, Lieutenant General George Kenney. All made their way to Morotai and interviewed the pilots involved, and all concluded that Cobby should be relieved of his command.

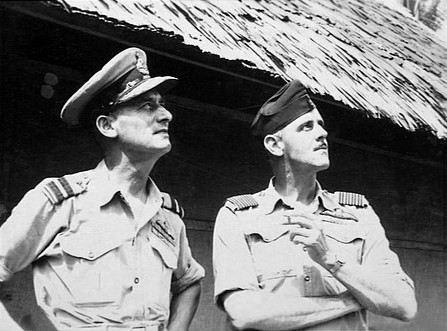
Air Commodore Cobby and Group Captain Caldwell (right) at Morotai: "the prima donna of one war, and ... the prima donna of the next war".

Bostock held Cobby responsible for the "dangerously low level" of morale in 1st TAF, but also noted "it is clear that he has been badly served by his senior staff". In the event, Jones transferred not only Cobby but also his staff officers, Group Captains Gibson and Simms, and Air Commodore Frederick Scherger took over command on 10 May. Cobby's departure was greeted with relief by Australian Army commanders, who were frustrated by the poor working relationship between 1st TAF and the Army units at Tarakan. Cobby defended his leadership of 1st TAF at the subsequent inquiry before Judge John Vincent Barry. During his testimony he declared that although his officers "wished to do more in the war than they were doing ... it was not within the power of 1st T.A.F. to give them that more important or more interesting work". He believed that his forces had played a significant part in making safe General MacArthur's flank during the Philippines campaign. Barry nevertheless found that Cobby had "failed to maintain proper control over his command", and that his removal as 1st TAF commander was justified.

Air Force historian Alan Stephens later described it as "a personal and institutional tragedy that a genuinely great figure in RAAF history had to end his career in such circumstances". The Oxford Companion to Australian Military History contends that Cobby's "gallant service flying career ... became another victim of the weaknesses and feuding within the RAAF's senior leadership during the Pacific War". Stephens summed up Cobby's military career by saying "No Australian airman's experience better illustrates the tensions between 'command', 'leadership' and 'heroism'", concluding that "the qualities that make a hero do not easily translate into those needed by a commander, although they are likely to engender leadership".

== Post-war career and legacy ==
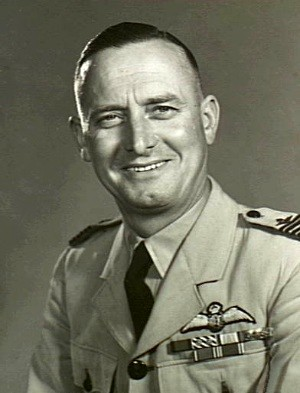
Portrait of Cobby in 1940

Cobby was officially discharged from the Air Force on 19 August 1946. He was awarded the American Medal of Freedom on 15 April 1948, in recognition of his war service. The citation noted that from September 1944 to January 1945, he displayed "exceptionally sound judgement and far sighted planning ... and materially assisted in support of the operations in the Philippine Liberation Campaign". Cobby had rejoined the Civil Aviation Board (by then the Department of Civil Aviation) after leaving the RAAF and served as Regional Director, New South Wales, from 1947 to 1954. He was appointed Director of Flying Operations early the following year.

On Armistice Day, 11 November 1955, Cobby collapsed in his Melbourne office and died later that day of hypertensive cerebrovascular disease at Heidelberg Repatriation General Hospital. He was given a military funeral at St Mary's Church of England, Caulfield, on 15 November, and cremated at Springvale Crematorium.

Cobby's tally of victories in World War I was the highest by a member of the Australian Flying Corps (the top-scoring Australian aces of the war, Robert A. Little and Roderic (Stan) Dallas, flew with the British Royal Naval Air Service and Royal Air Force). His record as an ace wearing the Australian uniform has remained unbeaten. Air Marshal Sir Richard Williams, Director General of Civil Aviation from 1946 to 1955 and widely regarded as the "Father of the RAAF", described Cobby as "a man whose personal story is threaded through the entire history of Australian service and civil aviation". One of the aluminium cutouts of Charlie Chaplin that Cobby attached to his Sopwith Camel in World War I later went on show at RAAF Museum, Point Cook, and the tail skid of one of his victims was displayed at the Australian War Memorial, Canberra. Cobby Street, in the Canberra suburb of Campbell, is named in his honour.

== Notes ==
Military offices
Preceded by George Jones	RAAF Director of Recruiting; July 1940 – August 1942	Succeeded by Albert Chadwick
Preceded by Frank Lukis	Air Officer Commanding North-Eastern Area; August 1942 – November 1943	Succeeded by John Summers
Preceded by William Anderson	Commandant RAAF Staff School; December 1943 – August 1944	Succeeded by Ulex Ewart
Preceded by Frederick Scherger	Air Officer Commanding No. 10 Operational Group; August–October 1944	Group redesignated as First Tactical Air Force
Force established by redesignating No. 10 Operational Group	Air Officer Commanding First Tactical Air Force; October 1944 – May 1945	Succeeded by Frederick Scherger
