= No. 30 Squadron RAAF =

Royal Australian Air Force squadron

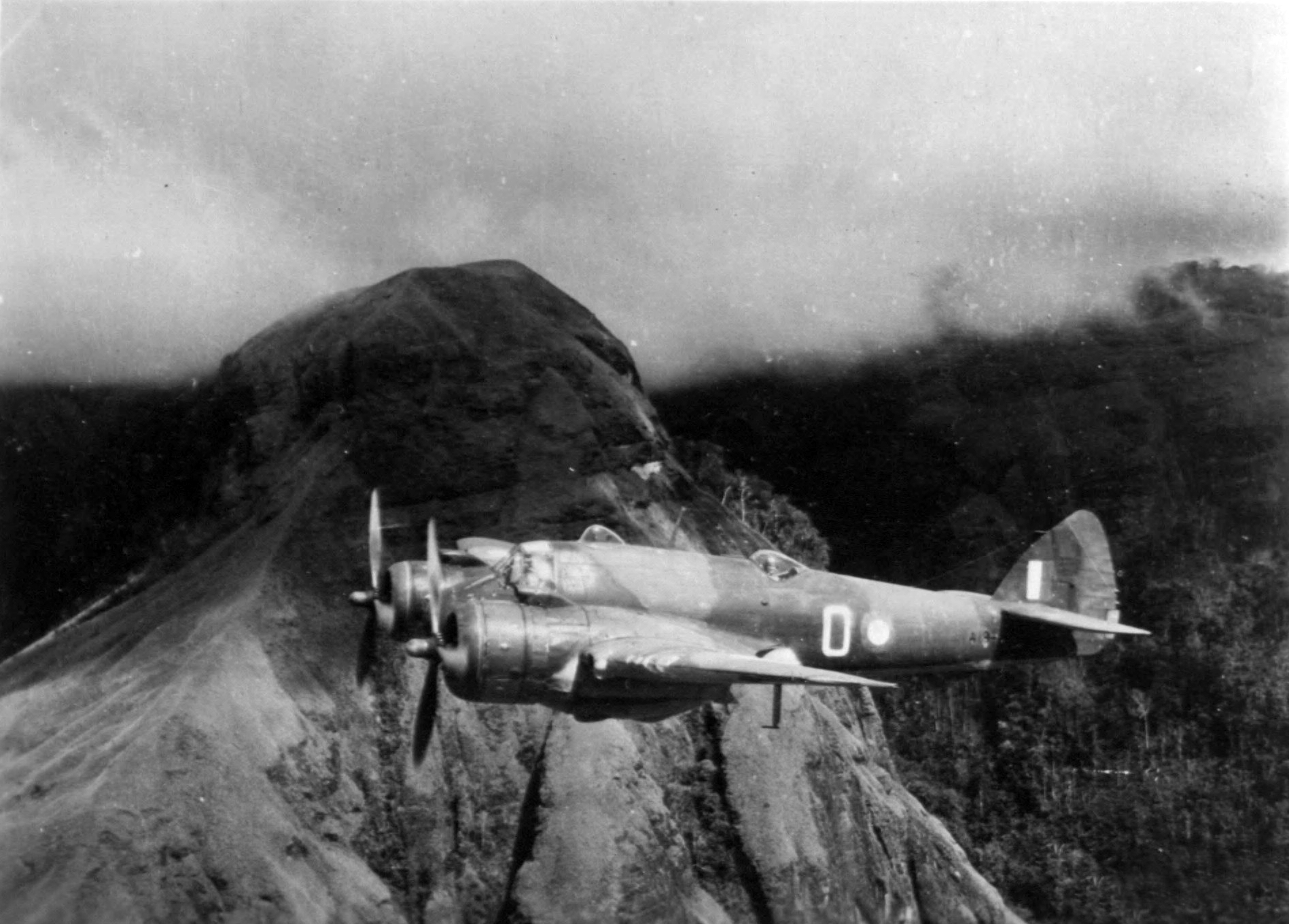
- A No. 30 Squadron Beaufighter flying through the Owen Stanley Range in 1942 (AWM OG0001)
- Active: 1942–1946; 1948–1956; 1961–1968; 2010–current
- Country: Australia
- Branch: Royal Australian Air Force
- Role: Base operations and training
- Part of: Combat Support Group
- Garrison/HQ: RAAF Base East Sale

No. 30 (City of Sale) Squadron is a squadron of the Royal Australian Air Force (RAAF). Raised in 1942 as a long-range fighter unit, the squadron saw action in the Second World War, serving in the South West Pacific Area against the Japanese and operating mainly in the ground attack and anti-shipping roles from bases in New Guinea and the Netherlands East Indies. After the war, the squadron was disbanded. However, it was re-raised a short time later as a unit of the part-time Citizen Air Force, operating in the target towing and air defence role in New South Wales. The squadron ceased flying aircraft and operated surface-to-air missiles in the 1960s, providing for the defence of Sydney and Darwin before disbanding in 1968. The squadron was re-raised again in 2010 and since then it has served as an airbase support squadron located at RAAF Base East Sale.

== History ==
=== Second World War ===
No. 30 Squadron was established at RAAF Base Richmond on 9 March 1942 as a long-range fighter squadron operating the Bristol Beaufighter. After a brief period of training the squadron deployed to Townsville where it escorted anti-shipping patrols. In early September a small detachment from the squadron was sent to Milne Bay from where they attacked Japanese shipping, becoming the first RAAF Beaufighter squadron to see action. Shortly afterwards, the rest of the squadron was deployed to Port Moresby in New Guinea from where it operated as a low-level ground attack unit supporting the Allied efforts in Papua, a role in which the Beaufighter proved highly successful.

No. 30 Squadron's primary mission during the war was attacking Japanese shipping and coastal bases, with the focus initially being upon targets around Buna and Sanananda, before being expanded to support operations along the Kokoda Track, Goodenough Island and Lae. In early 1943 the squadron took part in the Battle of the Bismarck Sea, an air-sea battle which resulted in heavy losses for the Japanese. During the battle, the squadron's aircraft conducted low-level attacks on Japanese shipping. They later attacked a Japanese airbase around Lae, destroying a significant number of Japanese aircraft. In July 1943, the squadron was moved to Goodenough Island, tasked with attacking Japanese airfields and searching for supply barges that were being moved along the coast between Madang and Nassau Bay. It also undertook convoy escort duties for Allied ships transiting the area. No. 30 Squadron remained on the island until November, when the squadron was moved to Kiriwina.

In March 1944, the squadron became part of No. 77 Wing, along with Nos. 22 and 31 Squadrons. It was then relocated to Tadji, from where it continued to interdict Japanese barge-borne supplies in the Aitape–Wewak region; these proved very successful and in October the squadron's arsenal was expanded to include air-to-ground rockets.

As part of the Australian First Tactical Air Force, No. 30 Squadron moved to Morotai in the Netherlands East Indies in November 1944 carrying out operations in the Celebes Sea and the islands of Ambon, Ceram and Halmahera. During this time, the squadron suffered a serious set back when it lost two aircraft destroyed and eight damaged in a Japanese night air raid; however, the losses were made up through either replacements or repairs and operations continued. During 1945, No. 30 Squadron supported Australian operations in Borneo and in May it deployed to Tarakan, flying operations from that island in support of the Australian landing at Balikpapan. The squadron returned to Australia in December 1945 on board HMS Glory and was disbanded at Deniliquin, New South Wales, on 15 August 1946. During the war, 68 of the squadron's personnel were killed in action or died on active service. The following decorations were bestowed upon members of the squadron: one Order of the British Empire, two Distinguished Service Orders, 26 Distinguished Flying Crosses and one bar, one Distinguished Flying Medal and three Mentions in the Despatches.

=== Post-war ===
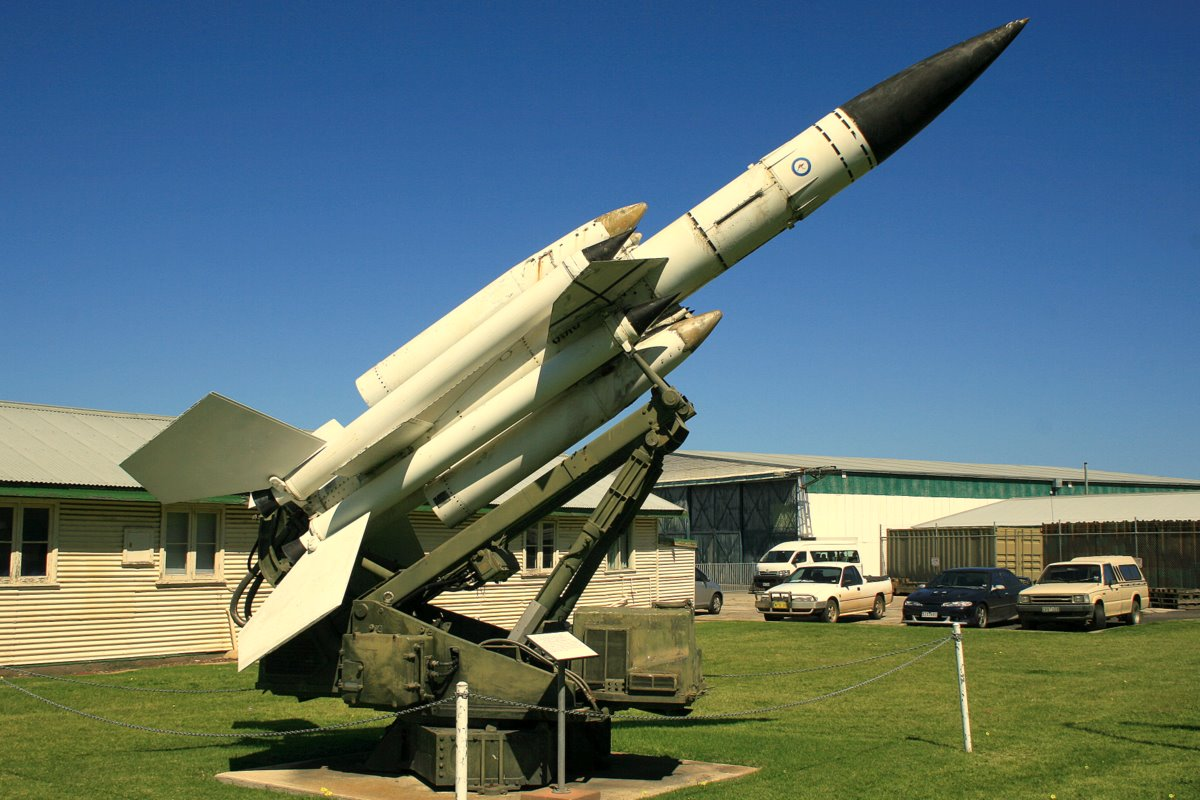
An ex-30 Squadron Bristol Bloodhound missile on display at the RAAF Museum

No. 30 Squadron was re-formed at RAAF Base Richmond as No. 30 (Target Towing) Squadron on 3 March 1948 through the redesignation of the Target Towing and Special Duties Squadron, which had been formed from a single flight at Richmond in September 1947. In this role the squadron supported Army, Air Force and Navy training exercises and research conducted by the CSIRO, operating a variety of aircraft including Beaufighters, Beauforts, Dakotas, Wirraways, Ansons and Mustangs. It was moved around a few times during this period, firstly to Schofields, New South Wales, RAAF Base Fairbairn and then back to Richmond. The squadron was again disbanded on 21 March 1956.

On 11 January 1961, No. 30 Squadron was re-formed at RAAF Base Williamtown as a Surface-to-Air Guided Weapons Squadron equipped with Bloodhound missiles. In this role the squadron provided air defence to the Sydney region and, from June 1965, to Darwin during the Indonesia–Malaysia confrontation. The squadron was disbanded again on 30 November 1968. To date, No. 30 Squadron is the only RAAF unit to have operated surface-to-air missiles, as ground-based air defence is currently provided by an Army unit, the 16th Air Land Regiment, Royal Australian Artillery.

No. 30 Squadron was re-raised on 1 July 2010 as the unit responsible for providing airbase support services to RAAF Base East Sale. The squadron is designated No. 30 (City of Sale) Squadron and forms part of Combat Support Group.

== Aircraft operated ==
No. 30 Squadron has operated the following aircraft:

- Bristol Beaufighter;
- Bristol Beaufort;
- Douglas C-47 Skytrain;
- CAC Wirraway;
- Avro Anson;
- CAC Mustang; and
- Bristol Bloodhound SAM.
