= No. 77 Wing RAAF =

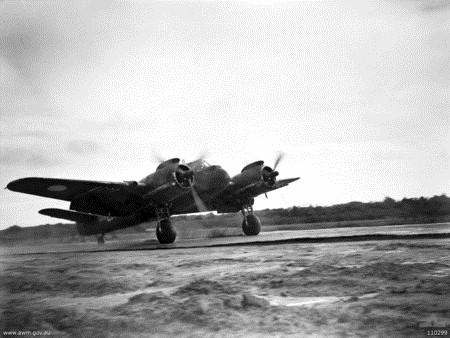
- Beaufighter of No. 31 Squadron, part of No. 77 Wing, landing on Tarakan airstrip, Borneo, 1945
- Active: 1943–46
- Country: Australia
- Branch: Royal Australian Air Force
- Role: Attack
- Size: Three flying squadrons
- Part of: First Tactical Air Force
- Engagements: World War II: Battle of Noemfoor; Battle of Leyte; Battle of Tarakan; Battle of North Borneo

Commanders
- Notable commanders: Charles Read

Aircraft flown
- Attack: Vengeance; Boston; Beaufighter

No. 77 Wing was a Royal Australian Air Force (RAAF) wing of World War II. It formed part of No. 10 Operational Group (later the Australian First Tactical Air Force) at its establishment in November 1943, when it comprised three squadrons equipped with Vultee Vengeance dive bombers. No. 77 Wing commenced operations in early 1944, flying out of Nadzab, Papua New Guinea. Soon afterwards, however, the Vengeance units were withdrawn from combat and replaced with squadrons flying Douglas Bostons, Bristol Beaufighters and Bristol Beauforts. The wing saw action in the assaults on Noemfoor, Tarakan, and North Borneo, by which time it was an all-Beaufighter formation made up of Nos. 22, 30 and 31 Squadrons. It was to have taken part in the Battle of Balikpapan in June 1945, but unsuitable landing grounds meant that the Beaufighter units were withdrawn to Morotai, sitting out the remainder of the war before returning to Australia, where they disbanded, along with the wing headquarters, in 1946.

== History ==
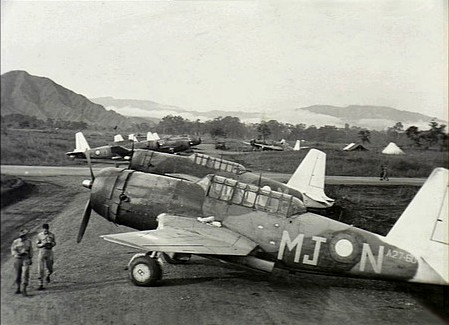
Vengeance dive bombers of No. 21 Squadron at Nadzab, Papua New Guinea, in February 1944

No. 77 Wing formed the attack component of No. 10 Operational Group (No. 10 OG), which was established on 13 November 1943. The group was to act as a mobile strike force capable of supporting Allied ground and naval units while they advanced against the Japanese in the South West Pacific Area (SWPA), as distinct from the RAAF's area commands in Northern Australia, which had a geographically based static defence function. Led by Wing Commander E.G. Fyfe, No. 77 Wing consisted of three flying squadrons operating Vultee Vengeance dive bombers, and various ancillary units. The Vengeances, which had only recently been acquired by Australia, equipped Nos. 21, 23 and 24 Squadrons. They were to be protected on their attack missions by No. 10 OG's fighter component, No. 78 Wing, operating Curtiss Kittyhawks.

Headquartered at Nadzab, Papua New Guinea, No. 77 Wing only became fully operational on 18 February 1944, following the arrival of Nos. 21 and 23 Squadrons from Lowood, Queensland. However No. 24 Squadron, which was already based in the theatre of operations, was able to carry out its first sortie on 17 January, bombing targets along Shaggy Ridge in support of the Australian 7th Division. Throughout February the Vengeances, escorted by No. 78 Wing Kittyhawks, concentrated on harassing the retreating Japanese 20th Division, and attacking enemy airfields in the Madang Province. In March, a decision was made to withdraw the dive bombers from operations due to their inferiority to newer equipment. Three RAAF squadrons—No. 22 flying Douglas Bostons, No. 30 flying Bristol Beaufighters, and one other from No. 9 Operational Group flying Bristol Beauforts—were assigned to the wing as replacements.

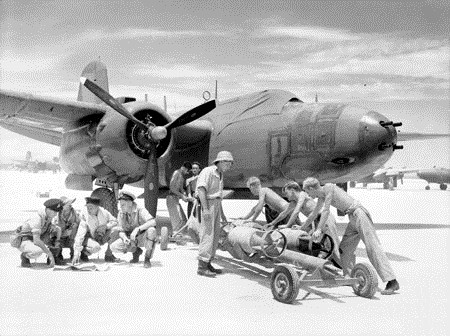
Boston of No. 22 Squadron being prepared for a sortie at Noemfoor in October 1944

Operating with its new squadrons and aircraft, No. 77 Wing took part in the Battle of Noemfoor, commencing in June 1944. Wing headquarters relocated to Noemfoor Island in July, followed by Nos. 22 and 30 Squadrons the next month. This was No. 77 Wing's composition on 25 October 1944, when No. 10 OG's name was changed to the Australian First Tactical Air Force, ostensibly to emphasise "the formation's impressive size and ambitious purpose". That month, the wing's aircraft were credited with sinking 24 enemy transport ships and barges in support of the Allied landings during the Battle of Leyte. In November, the wing advanced to the island of Morotai, where it attacked Japanese airfields, shipping, and infrastructure on Celebes. By the end of the year, Wing Commander Charles Read had taken over command of No. 77 Wing, and the formation's complement had been augmented by No. 31 Squadron, a Beaufighter unit previously based in Darwin, Northern Territory, as part of North-Western Area Command. No. 22 Squadron was withdrawn to Noemfoor in December to re-equip with Beaufighters; upon its return No. 77 Wing became an all-Beaufighter formation, operating three squadrons of the type.

During the first week of January 1945, No. 77 Wing's aircraft undertook 142 missions against targets in Halmahera, Celebes, and Morotai. In May, the Beaufighters provided air cover during Operation Oboe One, the Battle of Tarakan. In the days leading up to Operation Oboe Six, the Battle of North Borneo, No. 77 Wing surgically attacked enemy targets at Labuan, sometimes within only 100 metres of Allied demolition teams laying charges to breach obstacles on the beach prior to the landings. Read personally led No. 31 Squadron into action during the battle on 10 June 1945. He became the first RAAF pilot to land at the newly operational Tarakan airfield on 28 June. The following month, No. 77 Wing was to have taken part in the final Allied offensive of the Borneo Campaign, Operation Oboe Two, the Battle of Balikpapan. However Tarakan proved to be unsuitable for the Beaufighters to operate from, and they were withdrawn to Morotai, where they largely sat out the rest of the Pacific War. No. 71 Wing headquarters transferred to Deniliquin, New South Wales, in December 1945, and was joined there by Nos. 22 and 30 Squadrons, both of which disbanded in August 1946. No. 31 Squadron transferred from Morotai to Williamtown, where it disbanded in July 1946. No. 71 Wing headquarters disbanded at Deniliquin in November.
