= No. 62 Wing RAAF =

- Disbanded: 27 November 1945
- Country: Australia
- Branch: Royal Australian Air Force
- Role: Airfield construction
- Engagements: World War II

No. 62 Wing was a Royal Australian Air Force (RAAF) airfield construction wing of World War II. The wing played a significant role in supporting RAAF and United States Army Air Forces (USAAF) operations in the South West Pacific Area (SWPA).

== History ==
No. 62 Wing was established in January 1943. Following the war, No. 62 Wing's headquarters was disbanded on 27 November 1945.
