= No. 31 Squadron RAAF =

Royal Australian Air Force squadron

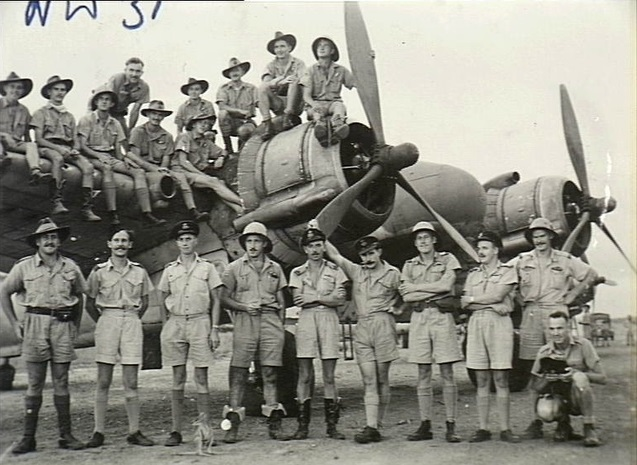
- Pilots and observers of No. 31 Squadron in January 1943
- Active: 1942–1946; 2010–current
- Country: Australia
- Branch: Royal Australian Air Force
- Role: Base operations and training
- Part of: Combat Support Group
- Garrison/HQ: RAAF Base Wagga
- Motto(s): Non circum coimus (No Turning Around)

Commanders
- Notable commanders: Charles Read

No. 31 Squadron is a Royal Australian Air Force (RAAF) airbase support squadron. It was formed in August 1942 and disbanded in July 1946 after seeing action against the Japanese in the South West Pacific theatre of World War II. During the war, it operated the Bristol Beaufighter, which it operated in long-range fighter and ground-attack missions. The squadron was re-raised for its current role in July 2010.

== History ==
No. 31 Squadron was formed at RAAF Base Wagga on 14 August 1942 and was equipped with Bristol Beaufighter fighter and attack aircraft, the first of which was received on 23 August 1942. Under the command of Squadron Leader Charles Frederick Read, who later went on to serve as Chief of the Air Staff, the squadron undertook a period of training before deploying to Batchelor Airfield, Northern Territory, in October, the aircraft flying via Alice Springs. A period of more intense training followed and familiarisation flights were carried out before moving to its operational base at Coomalie Creek Airfield on 12 November and then began flying combat operations on 17 November, attacking targets in Portuguese Timor.

During its first attack, the squadron lost one Beaufighter after being attacked by Japanese fighter aircraft. The following month, on 2 December, the squadron struck a Japanese airfield at Penfoei, where they destroyed 18 aircraft without losing any of their own. Later that month, the squadron shot down its first Japanese aircraft, when Sergeant Eric Barnett shot down a single-engined Nakajima Ki-27 "Nate" fighter over Fuiloro. From then the squadron flew ground-attack missions against Japanese forces in the Netherlands East Indies (NEI), concentrating on airfields and ships. It operated from Coomalie Creek in this role until December 1944 when the squadron moved to Noemfoor to bring them closer to targets in the region. From then until the end of the war the squadron continued in the ground attack role from bases in the NEI, including Morotai and Tarakan.

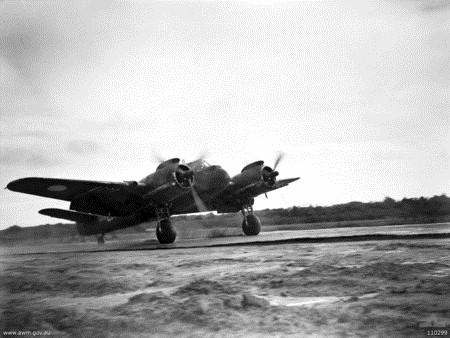
A No. 31 Squadron Beaufighter landing at Tarakan in June 1945

As the war progressed, the armament available to the squadron was developed; initially the Beaufighters employed 20 mm cannons and .50 calibre machine guns, but these were later supplemented with bombs and rockets, which were carried on hard points under the wings. With this configuration, the squadron's aircraft achieved several notable successes, including a number of air-to-air victories, as well as destroying many Japanese aircraft on the ground. In its first year of combat operations, the squadron was credited with 18 air-to-air victories and a further 49 aircraft destroyed on the ground; although losses amongst the squadron's aircrew were significant due to operating at low level. There were also some significant individual feats. One of the squadron's most successful pilots was Squadron Leader Reginald Lloyd Gordon, who shot down two Japanese twin-engined Kawasaki Ki-45 "Nick" fighters in one operation. In another incident, a flight of four Beaufighters from the squadron shot down three Japanese floatplanes in one sortie during an attack mission on a Japanese naval airbase in the Aru Islands, when they were attacked by nine Japanese aircraft.

After the war No. 31 Squadron conducted weather reconnaissance and escorted single-engined aircraft from the NEI to Australia. The squadron returned to Australia in December 1945, moving to Deniliquin, New South Wales, and was disbanded at RAAF Base Williamtown on 9 July 1946. During the war, 79 men from the squadron were killed in action or died on active service. Members from the squadron received the following decorations: 18 Distinguished Flying Crosses and two bars, one Distinguished Flying Medal, six Mentions in Despatches and one King's Commendation for Brave Conduct.

No. 31 Squadron was re-raised on 1 July 2010 as the unit responsible for providing airbase support services to RAAF Base Wagga. The squadron is designated No. 31 (City of Wagga Wagga) Squadron and forms part of Combat Support Group.
