= No. 114 Mobile Control and Reporting Unit RAAF =

No. 114 Mobile Control and Reporting Unit
- No. 114 MCRU's crest
- Active: 1943–48; 1949–66; 1968–current
- Allegiance: Australia
- Branch: Royal Australian Air Force
- Role: Air defence
- Part of: No. 41 Wing
- Garrison/HQ: RAAF Base Darwin
- Motto(s): Swift to React
- Engagements: World War II: South West Pacific theatre; New Guinea campaign; Admiralty Islands campaign; Battle of Tarakan; Malayan Emergency; Indonesia–Malaysia confrontation War in Afghanistan
- Battle honours: Pacific (1943–45); New Britain (1943); New Guinea (1943–44); Borneo (1945); Malaysia (1963-66)

Commanders
- Notable commanders: Gordon Steege (1943)

No. 114 Mobile Control and Reporting Unit is a Royal Australian Air Force (RAAF) radar surveillance and air defence unit. Located at RAAF Base Darwin, Northern Territory, it is controlled by No. 41 Wing, under Surveillance and Response Group. Its role is to "prepare for, conduct and sustain effective deployable Air Surveillance and Air Battle Management in the Unit's designated area of responsibility". The unit was formed during World War II, and deployed in the South West Pacific. Since the war it has seen service in the Malayan Emergency, the Konfrontasi between Indonesia and Malaysia in the mid-1960s, and the War in Afghanistan.

== History ==
=== World War II ===
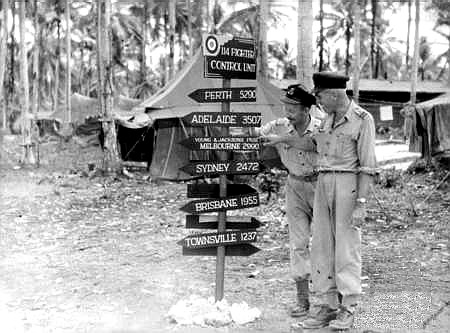
RAAF personnel examine a sign at the entrance to No. 114 Fighter Control Unit headquarters on Los Negros, in the Admiralty Islands, April 1944

No. 114 Mobile Control and Reporting Unit was formed as No. 14 (Mobile) Fighter Sector Headquarters at Camden, New South Wales, on 23 May 1943, under the command of Wing Commander Gordon Steege. The following month it deployed to Goodenough Island in New Guinea as part of No. 71 (Fighter) Wing, and became operational on 27 June. It controlled two radar stations, No. 401 of the US Army Signal Corps and No. 305 of the RAAF. On 8 August it moved to Kiriwina, under the aegis of No. 73 (Fighter) Wing. Steege relinquished command on 1 October to take charge of No. 73 Wing.

Responsible for controlling anti-aircraft batteries and air-to-air interceptions of Japanese raiders, the unit was renamed No. 114 (Mobile) Fighter Sector on 18 October. It registered its first "kill" on 31 October, when it directed a Spitfire of No. 79 Squadron to intercept a Japanese "Tony" fighter north-east of Kiriwina. On 2 March 1944, No. 114 Fighter Sector began redeploying with No. 73 Wing from Goodenough to Los Negros Island. Charged with coordinating air defence during the Admiralty Islands campaign, it was renamed No. 114 Mobile Fighter Control Unit (MFCU) five days later. The redesignated unit became operational on 2 April, and controlled Nos. 337, 340, 345, 346 and 347 Radar Stations.

In January 1945, No. 114 MFCU was withdrawn to Brisbane, where it began preparations to participate in the Australian-led liberation of Tarakan. In April, with a complement of over 800 officers and men, and Nos. 167, 168, 308, 354 and 355 Radar Stations under its command, it embarked for Morotai in the Dutch East Indies. From there it departed for Tarakan, arriving with the main invasion force on 1 May. Controlled by No. 78 (Fighter) Wing under the Australian First Tactical Air Force (No. 1 TAF), No. 114 MFCU became operational on the island four days after the landing. In addition to its regular duties, it temporarily took responsibility for maintaining contact with No. 1 TAF headquarters on Morotai and US Army Air Forces commands in the Philippines, when equipment belonging to the RAAF's Mobile Telecommunications Unit failed to be unloaded at Tarakan before the departure of its transport ship.

=== Cold War and after ===
No. 114 MFCU was rapidly reduced in size following the end of the war. It departed Tarakan for Australia on 3 December 1945 with No. 78 Wing, arriving at RAAF Station Deniliquin, New South Wales, on the 14th. Still under the wing's control, it relocated to RAAF Station Schofields on 31 May and then to RAAF Station Williamtown on 1 August, disbanding on 1 April 1948. No. 114 MFCU was re-established under a newly organised No. 78 Wing on 24 January 1949—"in name only", however, as it remained non-operational. It began training in late 1955 prior to anticipated reactivation, and was renamed No. 114 Mobile Control and Reporting Unit (MCRU) on 12 March 1956. It relocated to RAAF Dubbo and stood up as an independent unit on 14 November.

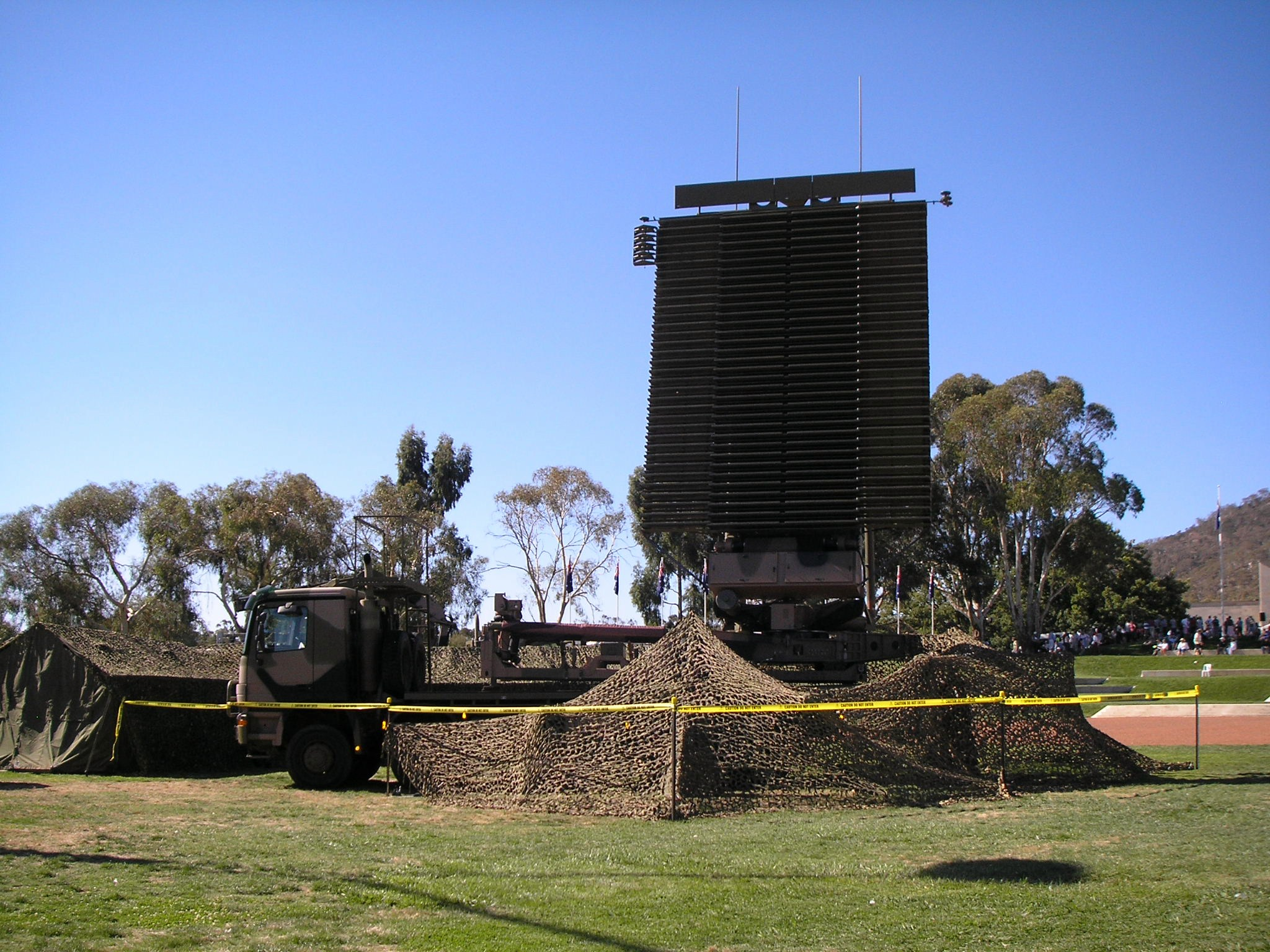
AN/TPS-77 radar of the type that currently equips No. 114 Mobile Control and Reporting Unit

No. 114 MCRU deployed to Malaya in 1958, becoming operational at RAAF Base Butterworth on 19 August. It took over responsibility for aerial surveillance and ground-controlled interception from the Royal Air Force's No. 487 Signals Unit on 1 December. From Butterworth, No. 114 MCRU directed the Sabre fighters of Nos. 3 and 77 Squadrons and the Canberra bombers of No. 2 Squadron in the last years of the Malayan Emergency. It also sent controllers on attachment to Ubon Air Base in Thailand, where No. 79 Squadron was based from 1962. On 3 September 1964, the unit went on to a 24-hour operational footing to support the Sidewinder-armed Sabres of Nos. 3 and 77 Squadrons during the Konfrontasi between Indonesia and Malaysia, though no combat ensued. Konfrontasi having been declared over in August 1966, No. 114 MCRU transferred its responsibilities to RAF Western Hill on 22 September, and disbanded at Butterworth on 31 October.

The unit was reactivated again at RAAF Base Amberley, Queensland, on 1 April 1968, employing the Plessey "Hub Cap" automated air defence system, which utilised Westinghouse radar and Marconi computer programs. It was to have moved directly from Butterworth to Amberley but delivery of the Hub Cap system, ordered in 1965, was delayed owing to programming issues. The system was also physically larger and heavier than had been anticipated, rendering it less easily transportable. In 1979, No. 114 MCRU upgraded to the Westinghouse AN/TPS-43 radar system, improving both its mobility and its tactical capabilities. It inaugurated the RAAF's Tactical Air Defence System (TADS, subsequently Tactical Air Defence Radar System or TADRS) on 10 July 1985. No. 114 MCRU was presented with a Squadron Standard on 23 May 1990, becoming the only non-flying unit in the Air Force to receive such an honour. The standard displays battle honours for the Pacific (1943–45), New Britain (1943), New Guinea (1943–44) and Borneo (1945). No. 114 MCRU was transferred to RAAF Base Tindal, Northern Territory, in May–June 1997, and then to RAAF Base Darwin in December 1999. The AN/TPS-43 was retired in September 2005, and replaced by the AN/TPS-77 radar. In May 2007, a detachment of 75 members of No. 114 MCRU deployed for active service at Kandahar Airfield in southern Afghanistan, utilising the AN/TPS-77 to coordinate coalition combat air operations. The detachment returned to Australia in August 2009. No. 114 MCRU celebrated its 70th anniversary at Darwin on 23 May 2013. It marked ten years service with the AN/TPS-77 radar in November 2015.
