= Dick Cresswell =

Australian fighter pilot (1920–2006)

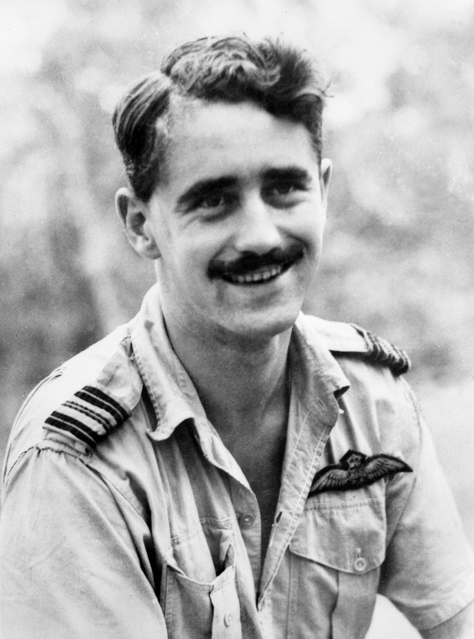
- Squadron Leader Cresswell as commanding officer of No. 77 Squadron, Darwin, December 1942
- Born: 27 July 1920; Launceston, Tasmania
- Died: 12 December 2006 (aged 86); Canberra
- Military career
- Allegiance: Australia
- Service/branch: Royal Australian Air Force
- Service years: 1938–57
- Rank: Wing Commander
- Nickname: "Mr Double Seven"
- Units: No. 3 Squadron (1939–40); No. 2 Service Flying Training School (1940–42); No. 1 Wing (1944); No. 81 Wing (1944–45)
- Commands: No. 77 Squadron (1942–43, 1944, 1950–51); No. 78 Wing (1947–48); No. 21 Squadron (1950); No. 2 Operational Training Unit (1953–56)
- Conflicts: World War II; South West Pacific theatre; North-Western Area campaign; New Guinea campaign; Korean War
- Awards: Distinguished Flying Cross; Distinguished Flying Cross (US); Air Medal (US)
- Other work: Commercial pilot, salesman

Richard Cresswell, DFC (27 July 1920 – 12 December 2006) was an officer and pilot in the Royal Australian Air Force (RAAF). He commanded No. 77 (Fighter) Squadron twice during World War II and again during the Korean War. Cresswell was credited with being the first RAAF pilot to shoot down an enemy aircraft at night over Australian soil, the only man to serve as commanding officer of an RAAF squadron on three occasions during wartime, and the first officer to lead a jet-equipped Australian squadron in combat. His performance in Korea earned him the Commonwealth and the US Distinguished Flying Crosses.

Born in Tasmania, Cresswell worked as an apprentice electrician before joining the RAAF in July 1938. He initially commanded No. 77 Squadron from April 1942 to August 1943, flying P-40 Kittyhawks in defence of Australia's North-Western Area against Japanese raiders. Cresswell claimed the squadron's first aerial victory—the first by an Australian over the mainland—in November 1942. He was wing leader of No. 81 (Fighter) Wing in New Guinea from May 1944 to March 1945, simultaneously commanding No. 77 Squadron for a second time between September and December 1944. In September 1950, during the Korean War, Cresswell took command of No. 77 Squadron in combat for the third time. He oversaw its conversion from P-51 Mustangs to Gloster Meteors, becoming the first RAAF commander of a jet squadron in war. Cresswell also flew F-80 Shooting Star and F-86 Sabre jets in combat while attached to the United States Air Force in Korea. He handed over command of No. 77 Squadron for the last time in August 1951, but flew six more missions as a Meteor pilot in 1953.

Cresswell was responsible for converting pilots to jet fighters as commanding officer of No. 2 Operational Training Unit in Australia from 1953 until 1956. He resigned from the RAAF the next year, and flew with Bobby Gibbes' Sepik Airways in New Guinea before joining de Havilland Australia in 1959. Initially employed as a pilot, he later became a salesman. Cresswell resigned from de Havilland in 1974 but maintained connections with military aviation, including No. 77 Squadron. He died in December 2006, aged eighty-six.

== Early life ==
Richard Cresswell was born in Franklin, near Launceston, Tasmania, on 27 July 1920. He was the only child of English immigrants George Cresswell, an engineer, and his wife Constance de Havilland, of the de Havilland Aircraft family. His father died when Dick was three-and-a-half, and he later moved to Sydney with his mother. For three years he lived with another family in Balgowlah, and commenced his schooling at Manly West. He again lived with his mother in Potts Point between 1931 and 1938, continuing his education at Double Bay and Randwick. After leaving Randwick High School in 1935, he began technical studies at Ultimo as part of an electrical apprenticeship with Westinghouse.

Fired partly by his mother's stories of joy flights in pre-war Britain, and a desire to become a flying boat captain for Imperial Airways, Cresswell applied to join the Royal Air Force (RAF) in September 1937. Receiving no answer from the RAF, he applied for the Royal Australian Air Force (RAAF), and was accepted. He entered No. 1 Flying Training School at Point Cook, Victoria, as an air cadet in July 1938. Over the next twelve months he learnt to fly in Avro Cadet, de Havilland Gipsy Moth and Westland Wapiti trainers, and graduated as a pilot officer. His first posting was to No. 3 (Army Cooperation) Squadron at Richmond, New South Wales, where he began flying Hawker Demon fighters in July 1939. Cresswell recalled a mix of excitement and panic within the squadron when World War II broke out two months later: "The second night we all slept on the hangar floor next to our aircraft. Imagine it: there was war over in Europe and here we were at action stations!"

== World War II ==
After a brief posting to Point Cook in early 1940, Cresswell undertook the instructors' course at Central Flying School in Camden, New South Wales. He then became an instructor at No. 2 Service Flying Training School, which was formed at Wagga Wagga in July and operated Avro Ansons and CAC Wirraways. The school's commander, Frederick Scherger, advised Cresswell to grow a moustache to overcome his youthful appearance. He was promoted to flight lieutenant in January 1941. Following the bombing of Darwin by Japanese forces on 19 February 1942, Cresswell was posted to Williamtown as a liaison officer with the 9th Squadron of the US 49th Pursuit Group (later the 49th Fighter Group), which operated P-40 Kittyhawks and would shortly transfer to Darwin to provide air defence for the North-Western Area.

The RAAF had meanwhile raised three fighter units—Nos. 75, 76 and 77 Squadrons—equipped with Kittyhawks recently delivered from the United States. Cresswell, newly promoted to squadron leader, assumed command of No. 77 Squadron at Pearce, Western Australia, on 20 April. At twenty-one, he was younger than most of his personnel. Drawing on his technical experience at Westinghouse, he encouraged his pilots to respect their aircraft and the ground crews that maintained them. Initially responsible for the air defence of Perth, No. 77 Squadron transferred to Batchelor Airfield near Darwin in August, becoming the first RAAF fighter unit to be stationed in the North-Western Area. It moved to another of Darwin's satellite airfields, Livingstone, in September. Cresswell led the squadron in the defence of Darwin against Japanese raiders and claimed its first aerial victory just after 5 a.m. on 23 November 1942, when he destroyed a Mitsubishi "Betty" bomber. It was the first "kill" for an Australian squadron over the mainland, and the first night victory over Australia. When he returned to base and was asked what he felt like, Cresswell replied, "Breakfast". He souvenired the radio operator's seat from the bomber's wreckage.

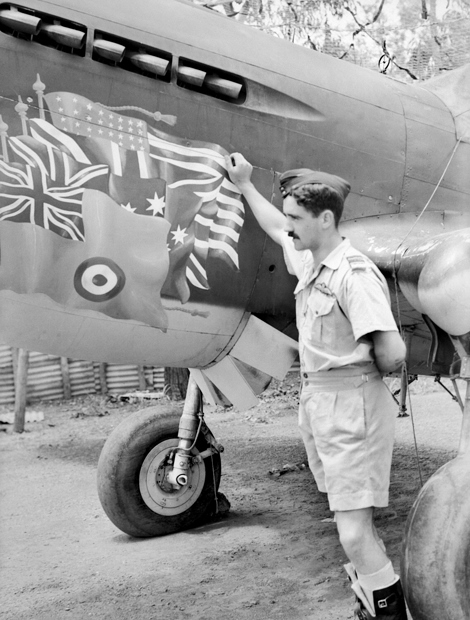
Squadron Leader Cresswell in Livingstone, Northern Territory, with the P-40 Kittyhawk in which he claimed No. 77 Squadron's first aerial victory, a Japanese "Betty" bomber, in November 1942

In February 1943, after No. 1 (Fighter) Wing and its three Supermarine Spitfire squadrons became operational in the Darwin area, No. 77 Squadron was transferred to Milne Bay in New Guinea. It came under the control of the newly formed No. 71 Wing, which was part of No. 9 Operational Group, the RAAF's main mobile formation in the South West Pacific Area. The Japanese attacked Milne Bay on 14 April, and Cresswell claimed one of four bombers (and a fighter) credited to No. 77 Squadron. The next month, No. 77 Squadron began moving to Goodenough Island, where it was controlled by No. 73 Wing. As Japanese fighter opposition was limited, Cresswell led the squadron in several ground-attack missions over New Britain. He was due to hand over command to his designated successor, Flight Lieutenant Daryl Sproule, on 2 August, but Sproule crash-landed during a raid the same day and was captured and executed by the Japanese. As a result, Cresswell remained in command another three weeks.

On 28 August 1943, Cresswell was ordered to report to Port Pirie, South Australia, for "flying duties", but found instead that he was to be court-martialled for "conduct to the prejudice of good order and Air Force discipline". The charge arose from an incident in July 1942, when Cresswell had stayed overnight at Port Pirie's mess and had fired his revolver into the floor next to the feet of another officer who apparently had been annoying him. Cresswell was found guilty and lost three months' seniority. He considered resigning his commission but was placated by the Air Member for Personnel, Air Commodore Frank Lukis. Cresswell was promoted to wing commander in January 1944, backdated three months to eliminate the penalty of his court-martial.

After instructing at No. 2 Operational Training Unit in Mildura, Victoria, Cresswell was appointed wing leader of No. 1 Wing on 25 February 1944, at the specific request of its commander, Group Captain Peter Jeffery, to help reduce Spitfire accident rates. In March, No. 1 Wing hurriedly despatched two squadrons to Western Australia in response to fears that a Japanese naval force would raid the Perth area; no attack ensued, and the squadrons returned within two weeks. Darwin was by now free of Japanese raids and Cresswell left on 12 May to become wing leader and temporary commander of No. 81 (Fighter) Wing in Townsville, Queensland. Comprising three Kittyhawk squadrons, including No. 77, the wing transferred to Noemfoor in western New Guinea as part of No. 10 Operational Group (later First Tactical Air Force), which had taken over No. 9 Group's mobile role and was supporting the US landings along the north coast of New Guinea.

Cresswell arrived at Noemfoor on 26 September 1944 to be informed by No. 81 Wing's new commander, Group Captain Gordon Steege, that he did not need a wing leader. Instead, Steege assigned Cresswell to command No. 77 Squadron, for the second time during the war. Cresswell questioned the decision through official channels, with the result that he retained the position of wing leader, as well as the command of No. 77 Squadron. The wing flew 1,125 sorties against Japanese buildings, stores and transport in October and November, dropping over 400,000 pounds (180,000 kg) of bombs for the loss of fifteen aircraft and eleven pilots. The following month, Group Captain Wilfred Arthur replaced Steege as commander of No. 81 Wing, and Cresswell handed over command of No. 77 Squadron, while continuing to serve as wing leader. Arthur recommended Cresswell for a Distinguished Flying Cross, but according to biographer George Odgers this was "'lost' in the system".

The relegation of First Tactical Air Force to areas of operation bypassed by the main Allied thrust towards the Philippines and Japan led to poor morale. Arthur produced a "balance sheet" to demonstrate that No. 81 Wing's combat results were not worth the cost in ordnance and casualties, setting in train events that would culminate in the so-called "Morotai Mutiny" the following April, when eight senior pilots, including Arthur and fellow aces Clive Caldwell and Bobby Gibbes, protested by attempting to resign their commissions. Cresswell was by then in Australia on leave, having posted out from No. 81 Wing in March. Though in complete accord with the aims of the "mutineers", he believed that attempting to resign their commissions en masse was not an appropriate response.

== Between wars ==
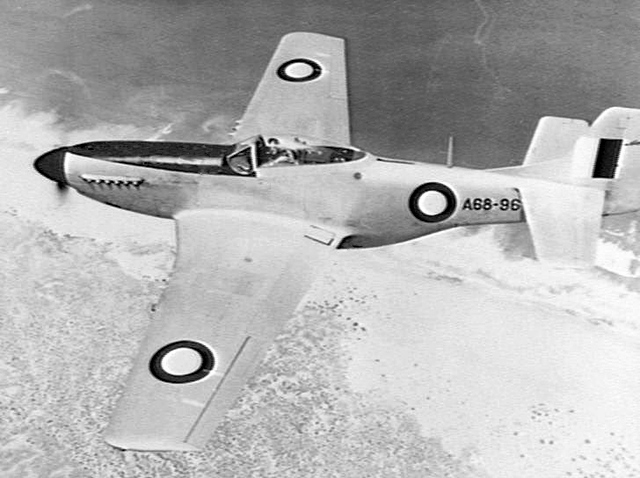
Wing Commander Cresswell pilots a Mustang of No. 78 Wing between Pearce and Williamtown, January 1948

Cresswell was on the twelve-week War Staff Course at the RAAF Staff School in Mount Martha, Victoria, when hostilities ended in the Pacific; the course finished on 28 September 1945. He was then tasked with developing a P-51 Mustang conversion course, to train pilots for service with No. 81 Wing, comprising three Mustang squadrons, including No. 77, as part of the British Commonwealth Occupation Force in Japan. On 1 February 1946, the crew conversion unit, CCU (Fighter), was established at Williamtown. Cresswell served initially as the CCU's chief instructor, and then as commanding officer from 29 March 1947. At the same time, he took command of the Williamtown base, as well as No. 78 (Fighter) Wing, which controlled two Mustang squadrons and several ancillary units. He had married a war widow, Bettine Harrison-Owen (née Cotter), on 27 July 1946 at St John's Church in Toorak, Victoria. CCU (Fighter) disbanded on 7 July 1947, but Cresswell remained in command of Williamtown and No. 78 Wing until March 1948.

After a posting to Amberley, Queensland, Cresswell served on the directing staff of the first two courses held at the newly formed RAAF Staff College, Point Cook. The college was the successor organisation to the wartime RAAF Staff School, and commenced its first six-month course on 13 June 1949. Cresswell had by this time reverted to the rank of squadron leader, as the air force and its wartime officer corps shrank dramatically following demobilisation. On 10 July 1950, he was appointed commanding officer of No. 21 (City of Melbourne) Squadron, a Citizen Air Force unit based at Laverton and equipped with Mustangs crewed by reserve pilots. Cresswell was unimpressed by what he saw as the casual attitude of his part-time pilots and soon had them practising appropriate fighter tactics.

== Korean War ==
When the Korean War broke out on 25 June 1950, No. 77 Squadron was the only remaining RAAF unit of the British Commonwealth Occupation Force (BCOF) in Japan. Led by Wing Commander Lou Spence, the squadron was preparing to return to Australia when it was placed on standby for action over Korea; it began operations as part of the United Nations (UN) peacekeeping force a week later. Spence was killed in action on 9 September, and Cresswell was despatched to replace him as commanding officer. Cresswell thus became the only officer to lead the same RAAF squadron on three occasions during wartime. According to George Odgers, his prior command of the squadron in combat and long experience flying single-engined aircraft, including the Mustang, meant that "it would have been very difficult to find a RAAF fighter pilot who could equal Squadron Leader Cresswell's qualifications". Alan Stephens, in the official history of the post-war Air Force, noted that Cresswell was considered "a good organiser and a 'goer'". In an unusual move, the RAAF did not raise him to wing commander; he became No. 77 Squadron's longest-serving commanding officer of the Korean War, but also the only one ranked squadron leader. This had the effect of ranking him below the US squadron commanders with whom he had to cooperate and of leaving him without an operations officer of squadron leader rank to whom he could delegate some of the day-to-day tasks of running his unit.

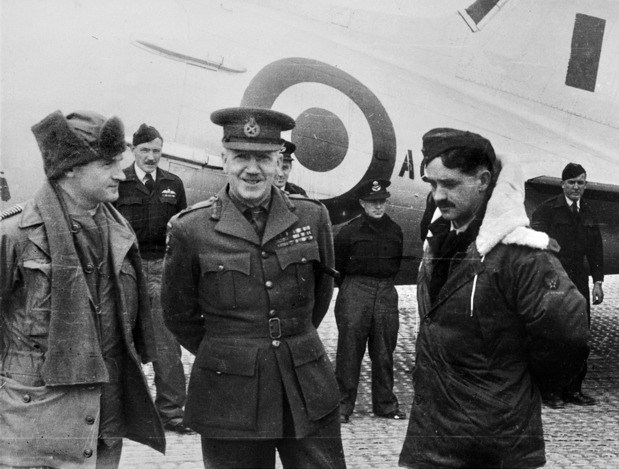
Squadron Leader Cresswell (right) commanding No. 77 Squadron, with Lieutenant General Sir Horace Robertson (centre) and Group Captain Dallas Charlton (left) commanding No. 91 Wing, South Korea, December 1950

Spence's loss was a heavy blow to the squadron, and Cresswell's first task after arriving in Japan on 17 September 1950 was to restore morale. Pilot Jim Flemming recalled that Cresswell "led from the front", undertaking four sorties on 20 September, his first day of operations. No. 77 Squadron transferred from Iwakuni in Japan to Pohang, South Korea, on 12 October to support UN troops advancing northwards from the Pusan Perimeter following General Douglas MacArthur's amphibious landing behind North Korean lines at Inchon. On 20 October, the squadron became a component of the RAAF's newly established No. 91 (Composite) Wing, headquartered at Iwakuni, but was under the operational control of the US 35th Fighter-Interceptor Group. Cresswell believed that the Iwakuni-based wing headquarters was not always in tune with frontline requirements, and he often dealt directly with Lieutenant General Sir Horace Robertson, BCOF commander and the theatre's senior Australian officer, and the RAAF's Deputy Chief of the Air Staff, Air Vice Marshal Scherger, former commander at Wagga Wagga.

China entered the war in October 1950, and No. 77 Squadron undertook its first sorties against Chinese ground forces on 1 November. It flew its first missions supporting the Australian Army four days later, when Cresswell led attacks on Chinese armour opposing the 3rd Battalion, Royal Australian Regiment, at Pakchon. The 3rd Battalion's Major Bruce Ferguson described No. 77 Squadron's close support as "the closest I have ever seen". On 16 November, the Australians began moving forward with the 35th Group to Yonpo, near Hamhung. From Yonpo they flew missions against Chinese forces surrounding the US Marines at Chosin Reservoir; Cresswell personally commanded several night sorties, attacking Chinese positions with machine guns and rockets. The Communist advance resulted in the squadron being hurriedly withdrawn to Pusan in early December. Cresswell had made a point of briefing his squadron every night during the developing crisis to avoid any panic arising from unsubstantiated rumours; the commander of the US Fifth Air Force, Lieutenant General Earle E. Partridge, praised him for his leadership.

Since November 1950, the Communists had been operating a Russian-designed swept-wing jet fighter, the Mikoyan-Gurevich MiG-15, that outclassed all other fighters in the theatre except the new F-86 Sabre. The MiGs were often flown by seasoned Soviet Air Force pilots, whose deployment was unofficial, and denied at the time by the Soviet Union. The RAAF tried to purchase Sabres to replace No. 77 Squadron's Mustangs but deliveries could not begin until 1954, so in December the Australian government agreed to buy British Gloster Meteor straight-wing jet fighters. In January and February 1951, while awaiting delivery of the Meteors, Cresswell gained jet experience by converting to F-80 Shooting Stars and flying ten combat missions on attachment to the USAF's 8th Fighter Group. This convinced him that the Meteors would require radio compasses to navigate in bad weather, and with the support of the USAF he succeeded in having these fitted. No. 77 Squadron completed its last Mustang mission on 6 April 1951 and returned to Iwakuni the next day to begin converting to Meteors. Since July 1950 it had been credited with destroying sixty armoured vehicles and guns, 600 other vehicles, and over 2,000 buildings. Sixteen Mustangs had been destroyed and thirteen pilots killed. The squadron's loss rate in Korea was higher than it had sustained in a similar period during World War II. On 20 April, the Americans awarded Cresswell the Air Medal for "meritorious service" and the Distinguished Flying Cross for "superior flying ability and extraordinary achievement". Permission to wear the decorations was gazetted on 22 June and 13 July, respectively.

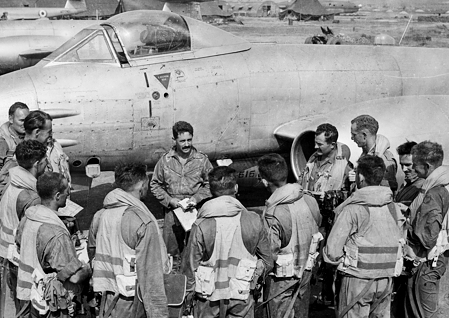
Squadron Leader Cresswell (centre), on his third tour as commanding officer of No. 77 Squadron, briefs Meteor pilots at Kimpo before a mission over North Korea, August 1951

Though it had operated mainly as a ground-attack unit with its Mustangs, No. 77 Squadron's primary role in the RAAF was interception, and it was hoped that with the Meteor it could again focus on fighter duties, particularly as the USAF had only two squadrons of Sabres in Korea. Cresswell therefore arranged for the USAF to lend him a Sabre to simulate a MiG-15 in combat training with the Meteors at Iwakuni; he determined that the Meteor's manoeuvrability and rate of climb allowed it to match the swept-wing jet below 25,000 feet (7,600 m), so the best air-to-air tactic would be to work in concert with USAF Sabres operating at high level while the Australians flew at lower altitudes. On 20 July, No. 77 Squadron began moving to Kimpo, South Korea, where it was tasked by the USAF's 4th Fighter-Interceptor Wing.

Cresswell took the squadron on its first Meteor operation on 29 July, an offensive sweep in "MiG Alley" between the Yalu and Chongchon Rivers on North Korea's border with Manchuria, making him the first officer to lead an RAAF jet squadron in combat. After encountering ill-directed anti-aircraft fire over Pyongyang, the Australians saw MiG-15s parked in an airfield on the Chinese side of the border—where UN forces were forbidden to attack—but, somewhat to Cresswell's annoyance, the Communists refused to take off and fight. He led the squadron on further offensive sweeps with USAF Sabres, and missions escorting B-29 Superfortresses, but had no contact with MiGs in the air before completing his term as commanding officer and handing over to Wing Commander Steege on 16 August 1951.

Although no longer commanding a squadron, Cresswell continued flying in Korea. He secured another attachment to the USAF and converted to the F-86 Sabre in early September 1951. Between 22 September and 1 October, he flew ten combat missions in Sabres with the 336th Fighter Interceptor Squadron, dogfighting with MiG-15s on several occasions and damaging one. Cresswell left for Australia shortly afterwards, having flown a total of 144 sorties during the war: 110 in Mustangs, fourteen in Meteors, and ten each in Shooting Stars and Sabres. He was recommended for the Commonwealth Distinguished Flying Cross for "leadership of high order" on 23 October 1951; the award was promulgated on 8 January 1952. According to Alan Stephens, "many who were familiar with his performance thought the higher Distinguished Service Order would have been more appropriate. There were suggestions that his occasional flamboyance, confidence and impressive combat experience were resented by more pedestrian senior RAAF officers."

Upon returning to Australia, Cresswell was promoted to wing commander and appointed Fighter Staff Member at the RAAF Directorate of Operations. In late 1952 he was "dared" to fly from the Royal Australian Navy aircraft carrier HMAS Sydney, and did so in a Hawker Sea Fury after completing conversion. In his capacity as RAAF Fighter Staff Member, Cresswell returned to Korea in March–April 1953, flying six Meteor sorties with No. 77 Squadron, and reporting deficiencies in instrument flying and air combat technique among the pilots. An armistice ended the Korean War on 27 July.

== After Korea ==
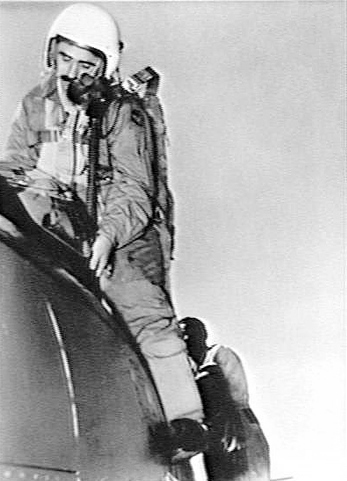
Wing Commander Cresswell, commanding No. 2 Operational Training Unit, delivers the first CAC Sabre to Williamtown, December 1954

Post-war demobilisation had seen the disbandment of all the RAAF's operational training units, and conversion of new pilots to combat aircraft became the responsibility of front-line squadrons. This practice disrupted the squadrons' normal duties, and the advent of the Korean War and the introduction of jets exacerbated shortfalls in operational training. Cresswell recalled that as commanding officer of No. 77 Squadron in Korea he had to send several replacement pilots back to Australia: "I don't blame the pilots, but I do blame the Air Force system. We had no operational training units, no operational training system and, as a result, the pilots came to Korea poorly trained and without instrument ratings. They just couldn't operate in the area."

The RAAF re-formed No. 2 Operational Training Unit (No. 2 OTU) in March 1952 to convert RAAF pilots to jet aircraft and train them for fighter operations. Headquartered at Williamtown, No. 2 OTU was initially equipped with Wirraways, Mustangs, and de Havilland Vampire jets. Cresswell assumed command on 21 May 1953. He established the unit's Sabre Trials Flight in November, to prepare for the introduction into service of Australian-built CAC Sabres. As well as performance testing, the flight was responsible for teaching air-to-air combat techniques, to fill a capability void caused by the departure of many veteran fighter pilots of World War II, and the RAAF's operational focus on ground attack rather than air combat in Korea. To facilitate the training, Cresswell and another pilot developed the RAAF's fighter combat instructor course in 1954. This course was administered at Williamtown by No. 2 OTU's successor formation, No. 2 Operational Conversion Unit until 2017, when responsibility for conducting it was transferred to the Tactics and Training Directorate.

On 3 December 1954, Cresswell led a formation of twelve No. 2 OTU Vampires in the shape of two sevens over Sydney to greet No. 77 Squadron upon its return from Korea aboard the aircraft carrier HMAS Vengeance. His successor as commanding officer of the conversion unit took over on 27 March 1956. Cresswell was posted to RAAF Headquarters, Melbourne, as Director of Air Staff Policy. The position put him in line for promotion to group captain but, as he admitted later, "I had itchy feet and I felt the Service had already given me all the operational flying I was likely to get." He decided to resign his commission in December 1956, and was discharged from the RAAF on 30 April 1957.

== Later life ==
On 13 June 1957, Cresswell became regional manager of a Melbourne firm salvaging metal from the battlefields of New Guinea, but the company wound up its operations in Australasia barely a month later. Bobby Gibbes then offered him the position of chief pilot with his New Guinea-based Sepik Airways. Cresswell flew Noorduyn Norseman and Junkers Ju 52 aircraft out of Goroka until October 1958, when he was hospitalised with hepatitis. He attempted to rejoin the RAAF the following year but was found to be suffering from malaria and dengue fever, as well as the after-effects of hepatitis. On 6 October 1959, he joined de Havilland Australia to fly DHC-2 Beavers in Antarctica. Cresswell's first marriage had failed after his return from the Korean War in 1951. He married Margaret Schwennesen, a pilot, on 23 December 1959 at Toorak Presbyterian Church in Melbourne; the couple had two daughters.

Cresswell began flying in Antarctica on 14 January 1960, mapping sections of the continent claimed by Australia. The task was cut short on 3 February, when the RAAF Antarctic Flight pressed his Beaver into service after three of its aircraft were lost in a blizzard at Mawson. De Havilland then assigned Cresswell to fly personnel and equipment for Australian Blue Metal in northern and central Australia. Between November 1960 and March 1961 he was involved in another Antarctic expedition, but in the end did little flying. De Havilland subsequently appointed Cresswell its sales representative in Canberra; in this capacity he travelled abroad and on one occasion flew the DHC-4 Caribou, shortly to be purchased by the RAAF for tactical transport in the Vietnam War.

After a series of minor heart attacks and two bypass operations, Cresswell resigned from de Havilland late in 1974 to live in South-East Queensland; his family elected to remain in Canberra. Cresswell continued his interest in military aviation, maintaining his RAAF connections, and patronising the Australian War Memorial (AWM) and the No. 77 Squadron Association. In April 1975 he presented the AWM with the radio operator's seat from the "Betty" he shot down in November 1942. After divorcing Margaret, he married a third time in 1979 but his new wife died two years later, and he returned to Canberra in the mid-1980s at the urging of his daughters. In 1992 he led members of No. 77 Squadron in a march through the streets of Perth, which had granted the unit freedom of entry in recognition of its role in the city's defence fifty years earlier. Cresswell also undertook speaking engagements, including the annual veterans' symposium at the Australian Command and Staff College (ACSC). On 23 July 1998, he was at Williamtown for the formal presentation of the Republic of Korea Presidential Unit Citation that had been awarded to No. 77 Squadron on 1 November 1951 for its performance in the Korean War. He visited the newly completed Bradbury Aircraft Hall at the AWM in August 2000, commenting, "The past has a very strong will to live." The following April, he was among thirty-two Korean War veterans selected to represent Australia at fiftieth anniversary commemorations of the conflict being held in South Korea.

Cresswell died in Canberra of a heart attack on 13 December 2006, aged eighty-six, and was survived by his second wife Margaret and their two daughters. His funeral was held at the Royal Military College, Duntroon, which was overflown by four F/A-18 Hornet jet fighters from No. 77 Squadron in a "missing man" formation. In 2007, an exercise at the ACSC was named after Cresswell.
