= Gordon Steege =

Royal Australian Air Force fighter pilot

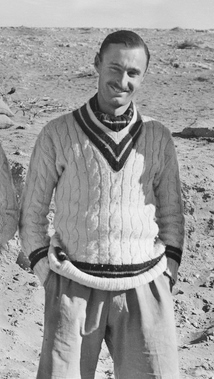
- Flight Lieutenant Steege serving with No. 3 Squadron in North Africa, December 1940
- Born: 31 October 1917; Chatswood, New South Wales
- Died: 1 September 2013 (aged 95); Palm Beach, New South Wales
- Military career
- Allegiance: Australia
- Service/branch: Royal Australian Air Force
- Service years: 1937–46; 1950–72
- Rank: Air Commodore
- Units: No. 3 Squadron (1938–39, 1940–41); No. 11 Squadron (1939–40); School of Land/Air Warfare (1952–53)
- Commands: No. 450 Squadron (1941–42); No. 14 Mobile Fighter Sector (1943); No. 73 Wing (1943–44); No. 81 Wing (1944); RAAF Station Schofields (1950–51); No. 77 Squadron (1951); RAAF Base Canberra (1957–58); RAAF Base Amberley (1964–67); RAAF Base Butterworth (1967–69); RAAF Base Edinburgh (1969–70)
- Conflicts: World War II; Middle Eastern theatre; Western Desert campaign; Syria–Lebanon campaign; South West Pacific theatre; New Britain campaign; Battle of Arawe; Admiralty Islands campaign; Korean War
- Awards: Distinguished Service Order; Distinguished Flying Cross; Mention in Despatches
- Other work: Aerospace consultant

Air Commodore Gordon Henry Steege, DSO, DFC (31 October 1917 – 1 September 2013) was a senior officer and pilot in the Royal Australian Air Force (RAAF). He became a fighter ace in World War II, credited with eight aerial victories, and led combat formations at squadron and wing level.

Born in Sydney, Steege joined the RAAF in July 1937. He first saw action in late 1940 with No. 3 (Army Cooperation) Squadron in the Middle East, where he flew Gloster Gladiator, Hawker Hurricane and P-40 Kittyhawk fighters. Achieving victories in all three types, he was awarded the Distinguished Flying Cross after shooting down three German aircraft during a single sortie in February 1941. He rose to command No. 450 Squadron in the Desert Air Force, before returning to Australia in December 1942. Posted to the South West Pacific, he commanded No. 14 Mobile Fighter Sector and, later, Nos. 73 and 81 (Fighter) Wings. He earned the Distinguished Service Order in April 1944 for his "outstanding leadership", and finished the war a group captain.

Steege resigned his commission after World War II, and worked for several years in New Guinea. He re-joined the RAAF during the Korean War and briefly commanded No. 77 Squadron in late 1951. Finding its Gloster Meteors to be outclassed by communist MiG 15s, he controversially took the RAAF squadron out of its air-to-air combat role in favour of escort duty and local air defence. Returning to Australia, he held senior administrative and training posts before taking charge of RAAF Base Canberra in 1957. In the 1960s he was appointed to several planning positions, followed by command of, successively, RAAF Base Amberley in Queensland, RAAF Base Butterworth in Malaysia, and RAAF Base Edinburgh in South Australia. Having been raised to air commodore, his final appointment before retiring in 1972 was on the staff of Headquarters Operational Command (now Air Command) at RAAF Base Glenbrook, New South Wales. He subsequently became an aeronautical consultant, and died in Sydney in 2013, aged ninety-five.

== Early career ==
The son of William and Ida Steege, Gordon Henry Steege was born in the Sydney suburb of Chatswood on 31 October 1917, and educated at North Sydney Boys High School. He recalled having always been interested in a military career, applying unsuccessfully to enter the Royal Australian Navy when he was twelve, and later the Royal Military College, Duntroon. After leaving school he spent three years with the Perpetual Trustee Company, where he was a probate clerk.

On 21 July 1937, Steege joined the Royal Australian Air Force (RAAF), undergoing flight instruction on Avro Cadets and Westland Wapitis at No. 1 Flying Training School in Point Cook, Victoria. He graduated with a distinguished pass on 23 June 1938, and was commissioned a pilot officer. His first posting was to No. 3 (Army Cooperation) Squadron at RAAF Station Richmond, New South Wales, flying Hawker Demon biplane fighters. Steege and the squadron participated in several exercises with the Australian Army, undertaking reconnaissance, spotting for artillery, and practising ground-attack missions. He was promoted to flying officer in December 1938.

== World War II ==
Following the outbreak of World War II in September 1939, Steege was appointed adjutant of the newly formed No. 11 Squadron, which operated two RAAF Supermarine Seagulls, and two Short Type C flying boats requisitioned from Qantas Empire Airways. Half of the squadron's personnel were Qantas employees. On 25 September, No. 11 Squadron became the RAAF's first unit to be based in Papua New Guinea, when the flying boats, accompanied by Steege in a de Havilland Dragon Rapide, flew to Port Moresby to undertake maritime reconnaissance in the region.

=== Middle East ===
Steege returned to No. 3 Squadron in May 1940, and was promoted to flight lieutenant the following month. On 15 July, the squadron departed Sydney for the Middle East to support the 6th Division in the Western Desert campaign against Italian forces. Sailing via Bombay, the unit arrived in Suez, Egypt, on 23 August. The next month it was equipped with a flight of Westland Lysander reconnaissance aircraft and two flights of Gloster Gladiator biplane fighters, augmented by four Gloster Gauntlets for dive bombing. Steege, a flight commander, was originally tasked with organising the Lysander contingent. In coming months the Lysanders and Gauntlets would be withdrawn, enabling the squadron to operate as an all-Gladiator fighter unit.

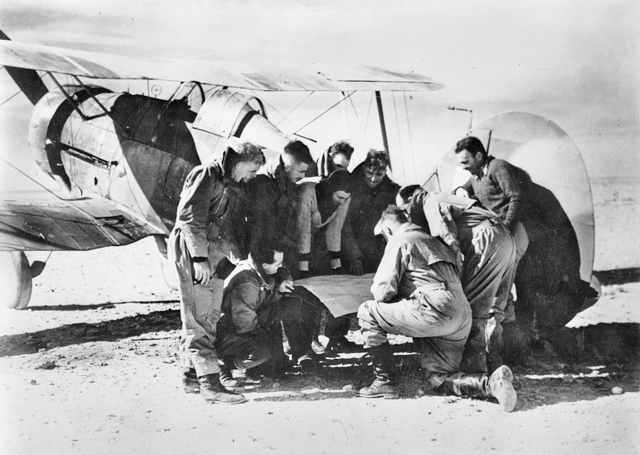
Steege (centre, in cream sweater) and fellow No. 3 Squadron pilots with a Gladiator in Egypt, c. January 1941

On 2 November 1940, the two Gladiator flights moved forward to Gerawla, near Mersa Matruh. Steege achieved his first aerial victory on 10 December. He was among a patrol of Gladiators that came upon a dozen Italian Fiat CR.42s that were strafing British troops near Tummar West; in the ensuing combat, Steege was credited with one of three CR.42s shot down without loss by the Australians, as well as a "probable". Three days later he was on patrol with five other Gladiators that attacked a formation of Savoia-Marchetti SM.79 bombers near Sollum; Steege claimed one SM.79 destroyed and another probably destroyed. An escort of eight CR.42s then attacked the Gladiators, forcing down five; only Steege, his aircraft damaged, was able to make it back to base. He was credited with another CR.42 destroyed, and one damaged, north-east of Sollum Bay on 26 December, when his squadron attacked a formation of SM.79s escorted by over twenty CR.42s.

No. 3 Squadron began re-equipping with Hawker Hurricanes on 29 January 1941. On 10 February, the squadron advanced to RAF Station Benina, Libya, to take over the air defence of Benghazi, which had been occupied by the 6th Division. German aircraft started appearing at this time, as the Afrika Korps under General Erwin Rommel, supported by a Luftwaffe contingent, arrived in North Africa to reinforce the Italians. Steege was flying a Hurricane on 18 February when he shot down three German Junkers Ju 87 Stukas in a single sortie near Mersa Matruh to become his unit's second ace. The Germans launched an offensive in March, and Benina was evacuated on 3 April. That day, No. 3 Squadron, operating in concert with No. 73 Squadron RAF, surprised a formation of Ju 87s escorted by Messerschmitt Bf 110s; Steege led his section of four Hurricanes against the Bf 110s, and was credited with destroying one and damaging three others. He was recommended for the Distinguished Flying Cross for his "unfailing courage" and destruction of enemy aircraft; the award was promulgated in The London Gazette on 8 April. Four days later, No. 3 Squadron re-located to Sidi Haneish, Egypt, having retreated five hundred miles (eight hundred kilometres) and operated from nine airfields in ten days.

Well, the Italian Air Force in North Africa fought honourably and their fighter pilots had quite a bit of dash [...] But the Germans wouldn't dogfight. They'd come and go, go away again, come and go. So they always had the initiative...

— Steege on his opponents in the Middle East

Raised to the acting rank of squadron leader, Steege was given command of the newly arrived No. 450 Squadron RAAF at Abu Sueir, Egypt, on 31 May 1941. At this stage the unit comprised only ground staff, so it was amalgamated with the pilots and Hurricanes of No. 260 Squadron RAF, which had been established without ground crew, to form No. 260/450 (Hurricane) Squadron. The combined unit relocated to Amman in Transjordan on 29 June and undertook its first operation the same day, when the Hurricanes attacked Vichy French airfields and infrastructure as part of the invasion of Syria. No. 260/450 Squadron went on to fly over eighty sorties during the Syrian campaign, mainly against airfields. By August, No. 260 Squadron's ground crew had arrived and the unit was detached from No. 450 Squadron, which thus became denuded of pilots, except for Steege himself. The operational requirements of existing forces, and the Australian Air Board's insistence on staffing Article XV squadrons such as No. 450 with Australian Empire Air Training Scheme aircrew rather than regular RAAF members, kept the unit short of pilots for an extended period, relegating it to training and maintenance duties. Steege was mentioned in despatches on 24 September for his leadership of the squadron. By December 1941, it was at nominal strength and equipped with P-40 Kittyhawks; it commenced combat operations out of Gambut and El Adem, Libya, and began registering victories in February 1942. Flying a Kittyhawk, Steege claimed a probable victory over a Messerschmitt Bf 109 near Martuba on 28 March; it was later confirmed as destroyed. He was credited with damaging a Macchi MC.200 in the Tobruk area on 3 April.

Steege handed over command of No. 450 Squadron on 7 May 1942, and subsequently attended the Middle East Staff School in Haifa, Palestine. He was promoted to the temporary rank of wing commander in October and returned to Australia in December. His final tally of victories in the Middle Eastern theatre was eight aircraft destroyed, two probables and five damaged.

=== South West Pacific ===
Steege undertook a fighter sector training course in January 1943, and in March was given command of No. 8 Fighter Sector Headquarters in Brisbane, a position he considered "a letdown" in light of his operational experience versus the sector's role in monitoring only transport flights. As a result, he later contended, of his petitioning Eastern Area Command for reassignment to combat duties and complaining to Group Officer Clare Stevenson that there were too many WAAAFs in the sector for an unmarried man to supervise, he was posted to command No. 14 Mobile Fighter Sector Headquarters at Camden, New South Wales, on 23 May. The following month, the unit deployed to Goodenough Island in New Guinea as part of No. 71 (Fighter) Wing, becoming operational on 27 June. In August it moved to Kiriwina, under the aegis of No. 73 (Fighter) Wing.

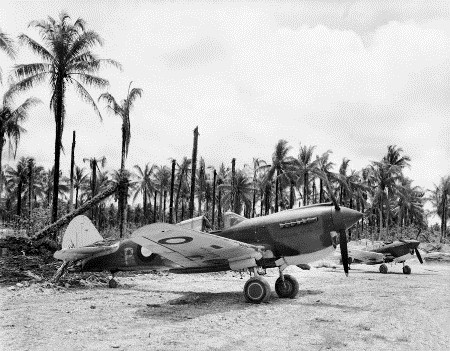
P-40 Kittyhawks at Los Negros, 1944

On 1 October 1943, Steege relinquished command of No. 14 Mobile Fighter Sector to take charge of No. 73 Wing. The wing's fighter units consisted of No. 76 Squadron, operating Kittyhawks, and No. 79 Squadron, operating Supermarine Spitfires. They were joined in November by another Kittyhawk unit, No. 78 Squadron. In preparation for the New Britain campaign, as part of the build-up to the assault on Arawe in December, the Kittyhawks launched a series of raids on Gasmata; three days before the Allied landings, Steege personally led a force of thirty-four aircraft in a bombing and strafing attack on the town's landing strip. In January 1944, the wing took part in the two largest raids mounted by the RAAF to that time, each involving over seventy aircraft attacking enemy camps and depots at Lindenhafen, New Britain. Steege was promoted to acting group captain the following month; the rank was made temporary in July.

As part of the RAAF's contribution to the Admiralty Islands campaign, Steege led No. 73 Wing on garrison duty at Los Negros, commencing in March 1944. The wing's combat squadrons—Nos. 76, 77 (Kittyhawks) and 79—were supported by No. 49 Operational Base Unit, No. 114 Mobile Fighter Sector (formerly No. 14 Mobile Fighter Sector), No. 27 Air Stores Park and No. 26 Medical Clearing Station, among other ancillaries. The fighters' main duty was providing cover for Allied shipping; they also carried out bomber escort, ground attack and anti-shipping missions. In mid-April, the wing escorted the largest Allied convoy in the South West Pacific to that date, eighty ships carrying 30,000 personnel that had embarked from Finschhafen, on the final leg of its journey from the Admiralties to Aitape. On 11 April, Steege was awarded the Distinguished Service Order for his "outstanding leadership in aerial combat in New Guinea".

Completing their garrison work in the Admiralties in August 1944, No. 73 Wing's Kittyhawk units were transferred to No. 81 (Fighter) Wing on Noemfoor under Steege's command. In September, No. 81 Wing became part of No. 10 Operational Group, which was renamed the Australian First Tactical Air Force the following month. During October and November, No. 81 Wing undertook offensive sweeps and ground attacks against targets in West Papua, and dive bombed Japanese airfields on Halmahera. Steege handed over command of the wing to Group Captain Wilf Arthur in December 1944. In January 1945, Steege became senior air staff officer (SASO) at Eastern Area Command in Sydney. He was posted to RAAF Headquarters, Melbourne, in May. From June to December, he attended the Army and Navy Staff College in Washington, D.C.

== Korean War and after ==
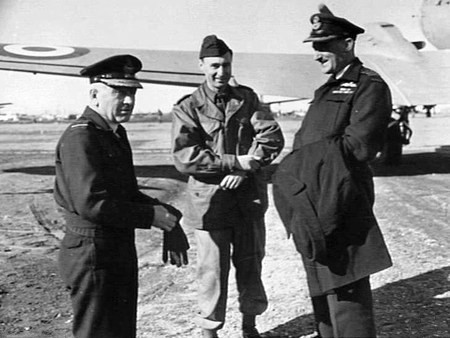
Wing Commander Steege (centre) with Air Vice Marshal John McCauley (left) and Group Captain A.G. Carr (right) in South Korea, November 1951

Steege married Joan Tait, daughter of Frank Tait, on 5 January 1946; the couple had a son in 1953. Joan Tait had a daughter, born in 1939, from a previous marriage. Steege was appointed the RAAF's director of operations in February. In December he resigned from the RAAF, joining the New Guinea Administration as a patrol officer the next month. He re-joined the Air Force as a wing commander on the outbreak of the Korean War in June 1950. In July he accompanied Major General William Bridgeford's mission to Malaya. Steege assumed command of RAAF Station Schofields, New South Wales, in September 1950, and commenced a jet training course at RAAF Station Williamtown early the next year.

On 16 August 1951, Steege succeeded Squadron Leader Dick Cresswell as commanding officer of No. 77 Squadron at Kimpo, South Korea, shortly after it converted from P-51 Mustang piston-engined fighters to Gloster Meteor jets. Steege had been posted to Japan in May and converted to Meteors at Iwakuni, but soon afterwards was despatched to an air power conference in Britain. Transportation delays meant he only arrived in Korea on 5 August, and had little time on the Meteor before assuming command of the squadron. One of his first actions, following discussions with the US Fifth Air Force, was to take the Australian unit out of its air-to-air combat role, and curtail its operations in "MiG Alley", the area between the Yalu and Chongchon Rivers on North Korea's border with Manchuria. Two encounters between No. 77 Squadron and communist MiG-15s had convinced Steege that the straight-winged Meteors were outclassed as fighters by the swept-wing MiGs. His decision caused controversy as some UN commanders believed that proper training and tactics would have allowed the Meteor to remain competitive as a fighter, and for the Australian pilots the change of role amounted to a loss of prestige. Steege flew few missions in Korea, a fact seized upon by Air Marshal Sir Cecil Bouchier, a senior RAF officer who had championed the Meteor and considered the action precipitate. The Chief of the Air Staff, Air Marshal George Jones, backed Steege and the squadron was relegated mainly to escort duty and local air defence. Morale suffered and it was not until after Steege's departure on 26 December that another offensive role was found for the Meteors, specifically ground attack.

... the RAF intended using it as a bomber interceptor, not for air combat, and it was suitable for the air defence of the UK in those days. But to put it into air-to-air operations against the MiG in Korea was just asking for an entire squadron to get knocked off.

— Steege on the Gloster Meteor

After returning to Australia, Steege was appointed chief instructor at the School of Land/Air Warfare, Williamtown, in February 1952. He was attached to the Department of Air in Canberra for two years beginning in August 1953, holding secretarial posts on the Chiefs of Staff Committee, Joint Planning Committee, and Defence Committee. After serving on the staff of Headquarters Training Command from August 1955 to May 1957, he took command of RAAF Base Canberra, Australian Capital Territory. Canberra was at this time home to No. 86 Wing, operating Douglas Dakotas and Convair 440 Metropolitans, in part to satisfy the Federal government's VIP transport needs. Steege was promoted to acting group captain in May 1958 (substantive two months later) before becoming a senior planner at the SEATO Military Planning Office, Bangkok, in December 1958. He returned to the Department of Air in December 1961, where he rose to become director of plans. Promoted to air commodore, he was appointed Officer Commanding (OC) RAAF Base Amberley, Queensland, in November 1964. Amberley garrisoned the RAAF's bomber headquarters, No. 82 Wing, which operated English Electric Canberra jets. In May 1967, Steege became OC RAAF Base Butterworth, Malaysia. The RAAF maintained two squadrons of fighters at Butterworth: No. 75 Squadron flying Dassault Mirage IIIs; and No. 77 Squadron flying CAC Sabres until 1969, when it was replaced by the Mirage-equipped No. 3 Squadron. In June 1969, Steege was appointed OC RAAF Base Edinburgh, South Australia, home to No. 11 Squadron, which operated newly delivered Lockheed P-3B Orion maritime patrol aircraft. He then served as SASO with Headquarters Operational Command (now Air Command) at RAAF Base Glenbrook, New South Wales, from May 1970 until he retired from the Air Force on 31 October 1972.

== Later life ==
After leaving the RAAF, Steege served as a consultant to several aerospace defence firms, including Martin Marietta Overseas Corporation, which he joined in 1983. His wife Joan died on 11 July 1984. Jennifer Fisher became his partner in 1987, and they married in 2004. Steege maintained his connection with No. 450 Squadron in later years; as a guest at the 1994 RAAF History Conference in Canberra he discussed the challenges of establishing the unit in the Middle East in 1941. In 2010, he joined three fellow members of No. 3 Squadron who had shipped out to the Middle East on 15 July 1940 for the 70th anniversary commemoration of the event at RAAF Base Richmond. Steege made his home in Palm Beach, New South Wales, and was a keen sailor. He died on 1 September 2013, aged ninety-five, and was survived by his second wife, son and stepdaughter.
