= Lou Spence =

Royal Australian Air Force fighter pilot (1917–1950)

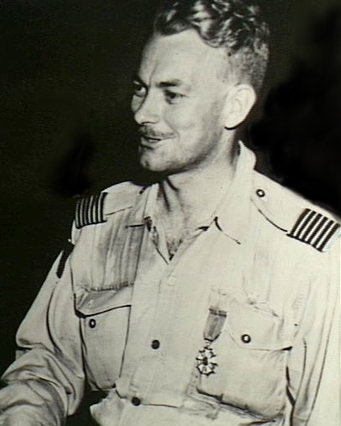
- Wing Commander Spence as commanding officer of No. 77 Squadron in the Korean War, August 1950
- Born: 4 April 1917; Bundaberg, Queensland, Australia
- Died: 9 September 1950 (aged 33); An'gang-ni, South Korea
- Military career
- Allegiance: Australia
- Service/branch: Royal Australian Air Force
- Service years: 1940–50
- Rank: Wing Commander
- Nickname: "Silver"
- Unit: No. 3 Squadron (1941–42)
- Commands: No. 452 Squadron (1944); No. 77 Squadron (1950)
- Conflicts: World War II; North African Campaign; North Western Area Campaign; Korean War †
- Awards: Distinguished Flying Cross & Bar; Mentioned in Despatches; Legion of Merit (US); Air Medal (US)

Louis Thomas Spence, DFC & Bar (4 April 1917 – 9 September 1950) was a fighter pilot and squadron commander in the Royal Australian Air Force (RAAF). During World War II, he flew with No. 3 Squadron, earning the Distinguished Flying Cross (DFC), and commanded No. 452 Squadron, receiving a Mention in Despatches. He led No. 77 Squadron in the opening months of the Korean War, and was awarded a bar to his DFC, the US Legion of Merit, and the US Air Medal, for his leadership.

Born in Bundaberg, Queensland, Spence worked in a bank before joining the RAAF in March 1940. In August the following year he was posted to North Africa with No. 3 Squadron, which operated P-40 Tomahawks and Kittyhawks against German and Italian forces; he was credited with shooting down two German aircraft. Spence commanded No. 452 Squadron in 1944, flying Supermarine Spitfires in defence of Australia's North-Western Area against the Japanese. After a brief return to civilian life following World War II, he rejoined the RAAF in October 1946. He took command of No. 77 Squadron, operating P-51 Mustangs as part of the British Commonwealth Occupation Force in Japan, in February 1950. The squadron went into action within a week of the outbreak of the Korean War in June. Spence was killed during a low-level mission over South Korea in September 1950.

== Early life ==
Born on 4 April 1917 in Bundaberg, Queensland, Louis Thomas Spence was the fifth child of Robert John Spence, a farmer, and Louise Margaretta Marie, née Koob. His ancestry was Irish on his father's side and German on his mother's. Spence attended Longreach State School from 1924 to 1931 and Thornburgh College in Charters Towers from 1932 to 1934. Successful academically, he also excelled at sports including cricket, rugby league, and tennis. His light-blond hair earned him the nickname "Silver". He was employed as a clerk at the Queensland headquarters of the Bank of New South Wales in Brisbane, and studied at the Bankers' Institute of Australasia.

== World War II ==
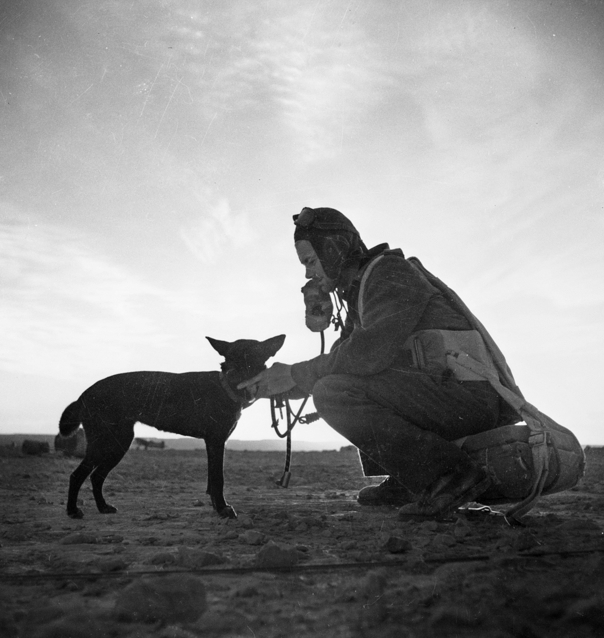
Flying Officer Spence with a dog that attached itself to No. 3 Squadron in Libya, January 1942

Spence joined the Royal Australian Air Force (RAAF) on 6 March 1940. After flying training at Point Cook, Victoria, and Archerfield, Queensland, he was commissioned as a pilot officer on 26 August. On 28 October, he was allotted to No. 25 Squadron in Perth, Western Australia. The squadron operated CAC Wirraways. Spence was promoted to flying officer on 26 February 1941. He married Vernon Swain, a nurse, in St George's Cathedral, Perth, on 24 May; the couple had two children. Swain's father had been a pilot with the Royal Flying Corps in World War I. In August, Spence was posted to the Middle East. He underwent operational flying training in Khartoum, Sudan, before joining No. 3 Squadron in September. Based in Egypt, No. 3 Squadron operated P-40 Tomahawk fighters against German and Italian forces.

On 1 January 1942, having converted to P-40 Kittyhawks, No. 3 Squadron attacked sixteen Junkers Ju 87 Stuka dive bombers and their escort of six Messerschmitt Bf 109 fighters near Agedabia in Cyrenaica; Spence was credited with shooting down a Ju 87. He landed his single-seat fighter in the desert on 26 January to pick up another No. 3 Squadron pilot, Sergeant Walter Mailey, whose Kittyhawk had been forced down. On 14 February, No. 3 Squadron and No. 112 Squadron RAF intercepted over thirty Italian and German aircraft attempting to raid Tobruk. The Allied pilots claimed twenty enemy aircraft destroyed, one of which, a Bf 109, was credited to Spence. He claimed a probable Bf 109 on 15 March, and was promoted to flight lieutenant on 1 April. In the first of his five sorties in the Bir Hacheim area on 16 June, Spence, along with Nicky Barr, bombed and strafed a column of German tanks and support vehicles, igniting fires that sent the smell of burning flesh into the cockpits of the low-flying aircraft – a "ghastly horror", according to Spence, that made him physically ill. His many ground-attack missions and two aerial victories earned him the Distinguished Flying Cross. Barr recalled Spence as being the "hottest dive bomber in the Desert" and "one of the rocks of the squadron".

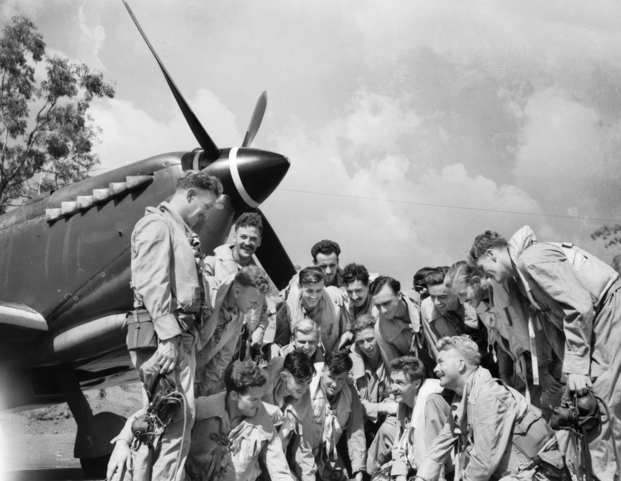
Squadron Leader Spence (right, kneeling) briefing pilots of No. 452 Squadron near Darwin, late-1944

Returning to Australia in September 1942, Spence was posted as an instructor to No. 2 Operational Training Unit in Mildura, Victoria. The unit operated several types of aircraft including Kittyhawks, CAC Boomerangs and Supermarine Spitfires. Spence was promoted to acting squadron leader on 1 February 1944 and assumed command of No. 452 Squadron two days later. Based near Darwin, Northern Territory, No. 452 Squadron was one of three Spitfire squadrons comprising No. 1 (Fighter) Wing, whose role was to defend North-Western Area from Japanese air attack. On 8 March, No. 452 Squadron was urgently dispatched to the vicinity of Perth, Western Australia, in response to concerns that a Japanese naval force would raid the area, but it proved abortive; no attack ensued, and the squadrons were directed to return to Darwin on 20 March. The journey to Perth had taken No. 452 Squadron through bad weather, and Spence was mentioned in despatches for his efforts shepherding his Spitfires to their destination. From 9 to 21 May, Spence held command of No. 1 Wing in the absence of the officer commanding, Group Captain Peter Jeffrey. The next month, No. 452 Squadron transferred from No. 1 Wing to the recently formed No. 80 (Fighter) Wing, commanded by Group Captain Clive Caldwell. Spence was promoted to temporary squadron leader on 1 July. No. 452 Squadron completed conversion from Mk V Spitfires to Mk VIIIs the same month.

Spence was posted out of No. 452 Squadron at the end of November 1944. Early the following year he joined No. 8 Operational Training Unit, which was based at Parkes, New South Wales, and operated Wirraways, Boomerangs and Spitfires, among other types. He was discharged from the Air Force on 19 November 1945.

== Between wars ==
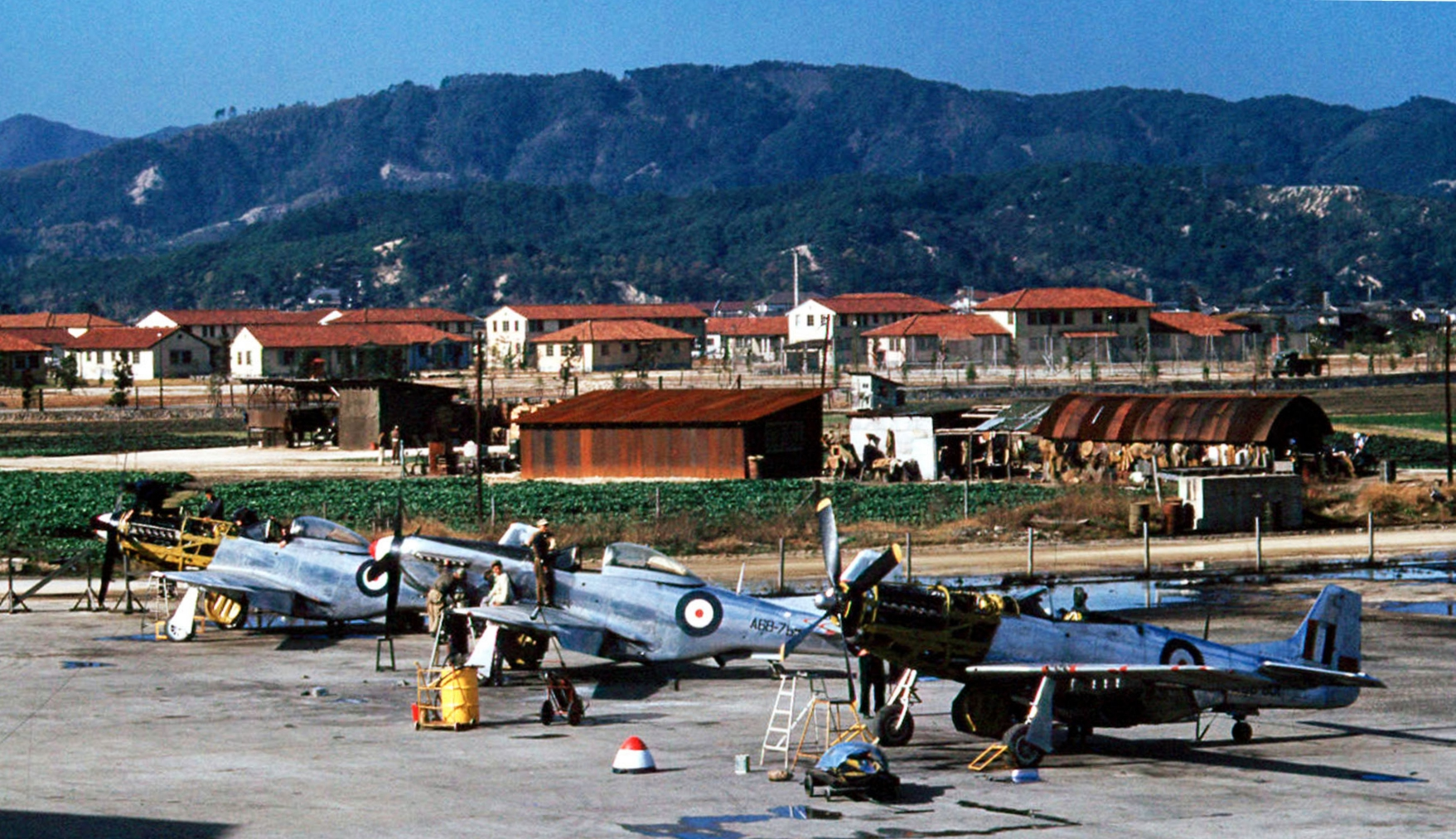
No. 77 Squadron P-51 Mustang fighters undergoing maintenance at Iwakuni, Japan, c. 1950

Rather than resume his banking career after the war, Spence joined the Department of Information in Canberra, initially in administration and later in aviation journalism. He rejoined the RAAF in 1946, receiving a commission as a flying officer (temporary squadron leader) effective from 17 October. His first appointment was as senior administrative officer at RAAF Station Canberra. On 13 September 1947, he flew to Surabaya, Java, as one of Australia's military observers with the United Nations commission monitoring the ceasefire between Dutch forces and Indonesian nationalists. That November, he was assigned to the recently formed RAAF College, Point Cook, where he was appointed adjutant and subsequently led the school's Cadet Squadron. In the latter role he inaugurated the college's adventure training, including canoe trips on the Murray River in boats constructed by the students.

Promoted to wing commander, Spence was posted to Japan to take command of No. 77 Squadron on 28 February 1950. Based at Iwakuni, the squadron operated P-51 Mustangs as part of the British Commonwealth Occupation Force (BCOF). Originally one of three RAAF fighter units under BCOF, No. 77 Squadron had since late-1948 been Australia's sole air component in Japan, becoming the largest flying squadron in the Air Force, with around 300 officers and men, forty Mustangs, and several transport aircraft. Occupation duties had been uneventful, the main operational task being surveillance patrols, but the RAAF maintained an intensive training regime and undertook combined exercises with other Allied forces. On 23 June, No. 77 Squadron made what was expected to be its last flight before rotating back to Australia.

== Korean War ==
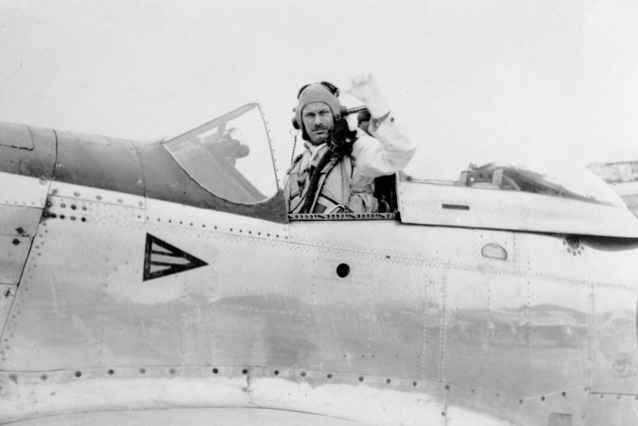
Wing Commander Spence in his Mustang fighter before a mission over Korea, August 1950

Spence and his family were about to go on holiday before returning to Australia when, on 25 June 1950, No. 77 Squadron was placed on standby for action in the Korean War, which had just broken out. The unit was specifically requested by General Douglas MacArthur, commander of United Nations (UN) forces. No. 77 Squadron flew its initial escort and patrol sorties from Iwakuni on 2 July, becoming the first non-American UN unit to go into action. That day, Spence took eight Mustangs on an escort mission for United States Air Force (USAF) B-26 Invaders attacking a bridge south of Seoul. Families still living at Iwakuni, pending their repatriation from what had become an operational theatre, could watch the Mustangs depart for missions over Korea.

A friendly fire incident occurred on 3 July 1950, when No. 77 Squadron attacked a train full of US and South Korean troops on the main highway between Suwon and Pyongtaek, inflicting many casualties, twenty-nine of them fatal. Before the mission, Spence had raised concerns that the North Koreans could not have penetrated so far south, but was assured by USAF controllers that the target was correct. The incident was widely reported in American newspapers but a public statement by Lieutenant General George E. Stratemeyer, commander of the US Far East Air Force, cleared the RAAF of blame. Spence was recommended for the US Air Medal for "meritorious service" in operations from 25 June to 15 July. His increasingly heavy taskload included diplomatic duties and public relations, as well as squadron administration and many combat sorties.

No. 77 Squadron did not encounter enemy aircraft in the opening phase of the war, but often faced intense ground fire. During July and August 1950, equipped with bombs, rockets and napalm, the Mustangs supported UN troops retreating before the North Korean advance. According to the official history of the Air Force in 1946–1971, the squadron's part in the Battle of Pusan Perimeter earned recognition "not only for the RAAF but also Australia at the highest political levels in the United States". On 15 August, Prime Minister Robert Menzies presented the Gloucester Cup to No. 77 Squadron as the RAAF's most proficient unit of the past year. General Stratemeyer arrived at Iwakuni a week later to surprise Spence with the award of the US Legion of Merit for "outstanding leadership in the preparation of his unit for combat".

On 9 September, in cloudy conditions, Spence led three other Mustangs in a low-level napalm attack on An'gang-ni. He attempted to pull out of a very steep dive but crashed in the middle of the town and was killed. Whether he was hit by ground fire or had misjudged his attack is uncertain. Spence's wife and children were still living at Iwakuni, and his death hastened the departure for Australia of all families on the base. He was succeeded by Squadron Leader Dick Cresswell, who had twice commanded No. 77 Squadron during World War II. Cresswell commented that "thanks to Lou Spence", the squadron "was led perfectly in all the jobs it did".

== Legacy ==
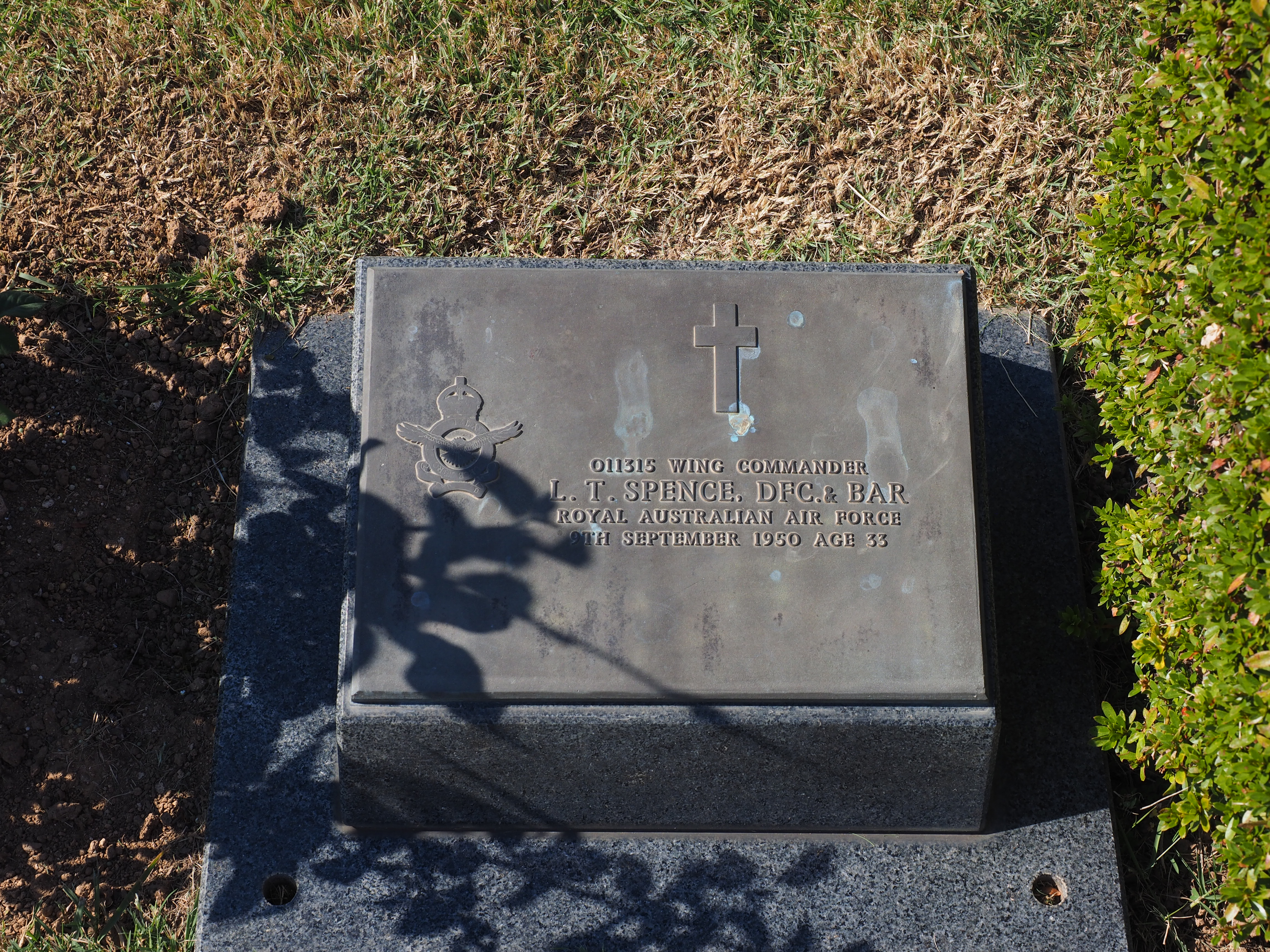
Spence's grave at the United Nations Memorial Cemetery in Busan

According to his brother, quoted in the Brisbane Courier-Mail, Spence wrote in his last letter home:

The world rapidly seems to be heading towards another war.

We are now in that state, where, if we don't rearm, we won't have any chance. Yet by rearming war becomes almost certain. Let's hope fervently that by rearming we will prevent war – although our little war up here is genuine enough. Anyway, I feel that fighting this little war here has so much meaning that I am giving it all the effort I have.

Flight Lieutenant (later Air Vice-Marshal) Fred Barnes described Spence's death as having "a tremendous impact ... He was very popular and respected as a professional. It was accepted that he was on the way to high rank." The official history of the post-war Air Force contended that Spence "appeared destined for the highest levels of the RAAF". Stratemeyer rated him "one of the most capable field commanders I have been associated with", and "one of the noblest and finest officers of any service".

Spence was recommended for the Distinguished Service Order for his "outstanding fearless leadership and distinction" in Korea, but the award was changed to a bar to his DFC. The decoration was promulgated in The London Gazette on 17 April 1951 and presented to his wife on 22 February 1952. His awards of the US Legion of Merit and Air Medal were gazetted on 22 June 1951; the latter was presented privately to Vernon Spence.

Advancing UN troops located Spence's body near his crashed Mustang in October 1950. He is buried at the United Nations Memorial Cemetery in Busan, South Korea. His name appears on Panel 2 of the Commemorative Area of the Australian War Memorial, Canberra.
