= No. 73 Wing RAAF =

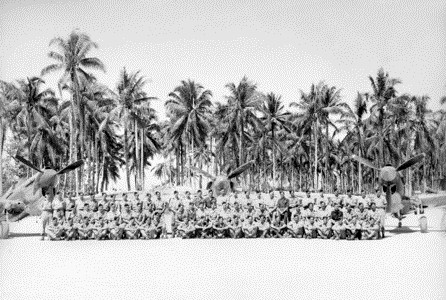
- Commanders and personnel of No. 73 Wing Headquarters and its three squadrons, Nos. 75, 76 and 79, at Los Negros in the Admiralty Islands, May 1944
- Active: 1943–44
- Country: Australia
- Branch: Royal Australian Air Force
- Role: Attack (1943); Fighter (1943–44)
- Size: Three flying squadrons
- Part of: No. 9 Operational Group
- Engagements: World War II: New Guinea campaign; Battle of the Bismarck Sea; New Britain campaign; Battle of Arawe; Admiralty Islands campaign

Commanders
- Notable commanders: Blake Pelly (1943); Ian McLachlan (1943); Gordon Steege (1943–44)

Aircraft flown
- Attack: Boston; Beaufighter
- Fighter: P-40 Kittyhawk; Spitfire

No. 73 Wing was a Royal Australian Air Force (RAAF) wing of World War II. It was formed in February 1943 at Port Moresby, Papua New Guinea, as part of No. 9 Operational Group. The wing initially comprised three attack squadrons flying CAC Wirraways, Douglas Bostons, and Bristol Beaufighters, with which it took part in the New Guinea campaign until mid-year. It was then reorganised with three fighter squadrons operating P-40 Kittyhawks and Supermarine Spitfires; in this form it saw action in the New Britain and Admiralty Islands campaigns through 1943–44. The wing was disbanded at Los Negros in August 1944, and by the beginning of 1945 its squadrons had been absorbed into other RAAF wings under No. 10 Operational Group (later the Australian First Tactical Air Force).

== History ==
=== New Guinea campaign ===
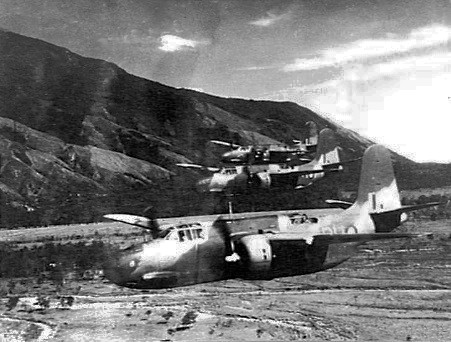
Bostons of No. 22 Squadron operating over New Guinea, c. 1943

Formed in February 1943, No. 73 Wing consisted of No. 4 Squadron (flying CAC Wirraways), No. 22 Squadron (Douglas Bostons) and No. 30 Squadron (Bristol Beaufighters). Based at Port Moresby, Papua New Guinea, the wing was under the control of No. 9 Operational Group, the RAAF's "premier fighting unit" in the South West Pacific Area (SWPA), whose purpose was to act as a mobile strike force in support of advancing Allied troops.

In March 1943, No. 73 Wing's units participated in the Battle of the Bismarck Sea, "the decisive aerial engagement" in the SWPA according to General Douglas MacArthur, that resulted in twelve ships from a Japanese convoy being sunk. During this engagement, some of No. 22 Squadron's Bostons struck Lae airfield to prevent Japanese fighters taking off to intercept Allied bombers, while others took part in the actual assault on the convoy; No. 30 Squadron's Beaufighters launched "withering" low-level cannon and machine-gun attacks on the Japanese ships to suppress anti-aircraft fire prior to bombing runs by USAAF B-25 Mitchells. Flight Lieutenant Bill Newton, one of the Boston pilots who attacked Lae, was awarded a posthumous Victoria Cross for pressing home bombing missions against Salamaua later that month, in spite of severe damage to his aircraft.

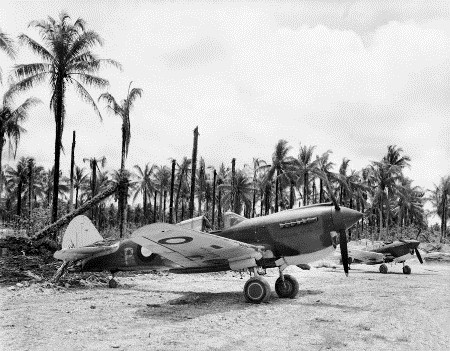
P-40 Kittyhawks at Los Negros, 1944

Having earlier been led by Wing Commander Blake Pelly, by June 1943 No. 73 Wing was under the command of Group Captain Ian McLachlan. That month, McLachlan established his headquarters at Goodenough Island, where the wing was reorganised as a fighter formation consisting of No. 76 Squadron (flying P-40 Kittyhawks), No. 77 Squadron (Kittyhawks) and No. 79 Squadron (Supermarine Spitfires). As well as providing local air defence, defending the naval forces assigned to Operation Chronicle, and fighter escort for Australian bombers, the Kittyhawks were themselves armed with incendiary and general-purpose bombs so that they could engage in ground-attack missions, a practice that had already been employed by Commonwealth forces in the Mediterranean and Middle East Theatre.

In August 1943, the wing transferred to Kiriwina, while No. 9 Group's other combat formation, No. 71 Wing, took over responsibility for Goodenough. Transport delays meant that No. 77 Squadron remained at Goodenough, however, and its place in No. 73 Wing at Kiriwina was taken by No. 78 Squadron, which arrived from Australia in November, also equipped with Kittyhawks.

=== New Britain and Admiralty Islands campaigns ===
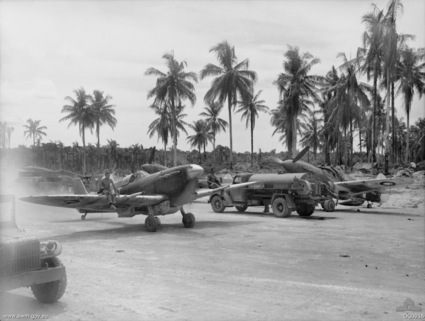
No. 79 Squadron Spitfires and their ground crews at Los Negros, 1944

Wing Commander Gordon Steege assumed command of No. 73 Wing in October 1943. Minimal offensive air activity by the Japanese meant that No. 79 Squadron's Spitfires saw relatively little action, while in contrast the wing's P-40s with their ground attack capability were "fully engaged". As part of the build-up to the Battle of Arawe in December, the Kittyhawks launched a series of attacks on the Gasmata airfield and fuel dumps; on the day of the Allied landings, as No. 76 Squadron Kittyhawks patrolled above the beaches, the Spitfires remained at Kiriwina in case of strikes by Japanese raiders, though none came. In January 1944, the wing's Spitfires and Kittyhawks accompanied Beauforts on the two largest raids mounted by the RAAF to that time, each involving over 70 aircraft attacking enemy camps and depots at Lindenhafen, New Britain.

As part of No. 9 Group's contribution to the Admiralty Islands campaign, No. 73 Wing took up garrison duties at Los Negros commencing in March 1944. Its complement of combat squadrons was again Nos. 76, 77 and 79 Squadrons, supported by No. 49 Operational Base Unit, No. 114 Mobile Fighter Sector, No. 27 Air Stores Park and No. 26 Medical Clearing Station, among other ancillaries, with total ground staff numbering approximately 900. The fighters' primary duty was providing air cover for Allied shipping; they also carried out bomber escort, ground attack and anti-shipping missions in the region. In mid-April, the wing escorted the largest Allied convoy in the South-West Pacific to that date, 80 ships carrying 30,000 personnel, from Finschhafen to Aitape. Completing its garrison work in the Admiralties that June, No. 73 Wing was disbanded at Los Negros on 29 August 1944. Its combat units were all eventually transferred to other formations under No. 10 Operational Group (later renamed the Australian First Tactical Air Force). Nos. 76 and 77 Squadrons joined another Kittyhawk unit, No. 82 Squadron, at No. 81 Wing on Noemfoor under Steege's command, while No. 79 Squadron was withdrawn to Darwin in November to re-equip with new Spitfires before joining No. 80 Wing and returning to the Pacific at Morotai in March 1945.
