= No. 77 Squadron RAAF =

Royal Australian Air Force squadron

- No. 77 Squadron's crest
- Active: 1942–current
- Country: Australia
- Branch: Royal Australian Air Force
- Role: Air-to-air/air-to-surface combat
- Part of: No. 71 Wing (1943); No. 73 Wing (1943–44); No. 81 Wing (1944–48, 1987–current); No. 91 Wing (1950–54); No. 78 Wing (1955–67)
- Garrison/HQ: RAAF Base Williamtown
- Motto: "Swift to Destroy"
- Engagements: World War II: South West Pacific theatre; New Guinea campaign; Borneo campaign; Occupation of Japan; Korean War; Malayan Emergency; Indonesia–Malaysia confrontation War in Afghanistan; War against the Islamic State
- Decorations: Presidential Unit Citation (South Korea)

Commanders
- Notable commanders: Dick Cresswell (1942–43, 1944–45, 1950–51); Lou Spence (1950); Gordon Steege (1951); John Quaife (1996–98); Mark Binskin (1998–99)

Aircraft flown
- Fighter: Lockheed Martin F-35 Lightning II

No. 77 Squadron is a Royal Australian Air Force (RAAF) squadron headquartered at RAAF Base Williamtown, New South Wales. It is controlled by No. 81 Wing, part of Air Combat Group, and equipped with Lockheed Martin F-35 Lightning II multi-role stealth fighters.

The squadron was formed at RAAF Station Pearce, Western Australia, in March 1942 and saw action in the South West Pacific theatre of World War II, operating Curtis P-40 Kittyhawks. After the war, it re-equipped with North American P-51 Mustangs and deployed to Japan as part of the British Commonwealth Occupation Force. The squadron was about to return to Australia when the Korean War broke out in June 1950, after which it joined United Nations forces supporting South Korea. It converted from Mustangs to Gloster Meteor jets between April and July 1951 and remained in Korea until October 1954, claiming five MiG-15s and over five thousand buildings and vehicles destroyed during the war for the loss of almost sixty aircraft, mainly to ground fire.

No. 77 Squadron re-equipped with CAC Sabres at Williamtown in November 1956. Two years later it transferred to RAAF Butterworth in Malaya to join the air campaign against communist guerrillas in the last stages of the Emergency. The squadron remained at Butterworth during the 1960s, providing regional air defence during the Konfrontasi between Indonesia and Malaysia. It returned to Williamtown in early 1969 to re-equip with Dassault Mirage III supersonic jet fighters. No. 77 Squadron began converting to McDonnell Douglas F/A-18 Hornet multi-role fighters in June 1987. It supplied a detachment of four aircraft to the American base on Diego Garcia in 2001–02, supporting the war in Afghanistan, and deployed to the Middle East as part of the war against the Islamic State in 2015–17. Along with its Hornets, the squadron briefly operated Pilatus PC-9s in the forward air control role in the early 2000s. It began converting to F-35A Lightnings in January 2021.

== Role and equipment ==
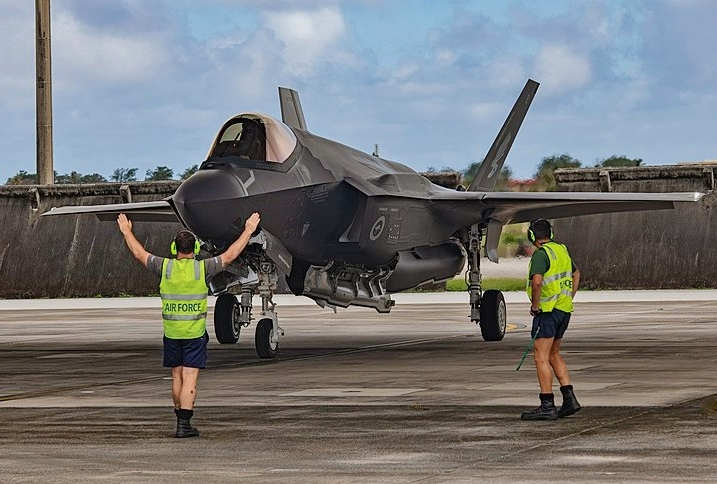
F-35 Lightning of No. 77 Squadron at Guam during Exercise Cope North, January 2022

No. 77 Squadron is located at RAAF Base Williamtown, New South Wales, and controlled by No. 81 Wing, which is part of Air Combat Group. No. 81 Wing maintains three fighter squadrons for offensive and defensive counter-air operations. As well as air-to-air combat, No. 77 Squadron is tasked with land strike, close air support and maritime strike missions. Its staff includes maintenance, supply and other support personnel. The unit motto is "Swift to Destroy" and the crest features an oriental temple lion, a legacy of No. 77 Squadron's role in the Korean War. Nicknamed the "grumpy monkey", the lion represents "a defender of peace, which, when disturbed, is swift to destroy".

The squadron is equipped with the Lockheed Martin F-35A Lightning II multi-role stealth fighter, which it began operating in January 2021. Capable of 9G manoeuvres, the single-seat, single-engined F-35 is armed with a 25 mm cannon and can carry short- and medium-range air-to-air missiles and guided air-to-surface ordnance in an internal weapons bay. It can be refuelled in flight by the RAAF's Airbus KC-30A Multi Role Tanker Transports. RAAF staff are responsible for day-to-day maintenance of the F-35; deeper-level maintenance is performed by Lockheed Martin through a contract with BAE Systems Australia. No. 77 Squadron regularly undertakes exercises with air forces from South-East Asia, New Zealand and the United States.

== History ==
=== World War II ===
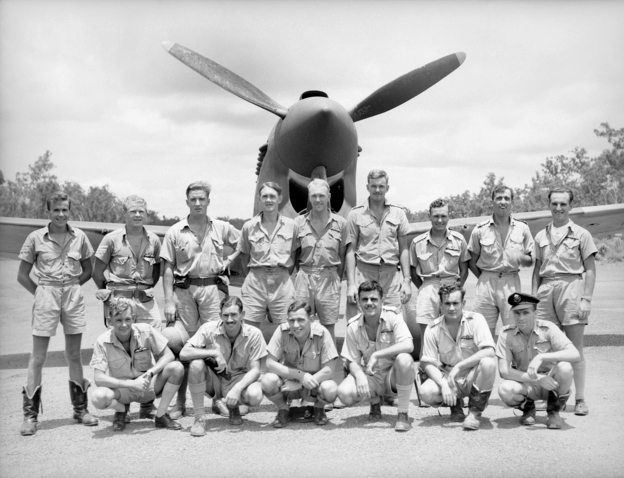
Pilots of B Flight, No. 77 Squadron, including Flying Officer John Gorton (back row, fourth from left) with a P-40 Kittyhawk in the Northern Territory, January 1943

As the Japanese advanced in the South West Pacific during early 1942, the RAAF hurriedly established three fighter units—Nos. 75, 76 and 77 Squadrons—equipped with Curtiss P-40E Kittyhawks recently delivered from the United States. No. 77 Squadron was formed at RAAF Station Pearce, Western Australia, on 16 March, with a complement of three officers and 100 men. Temporarily commanded by Squadron Leader D. F. Forsyth, the unit was initially responsible for the defence of Perth. Squadron Leader Dick Cresswell assumed command on 20 April. The squadron transferred to Batchelor Airfield near Darwin, Northern Territory, in August, the first RAAF fighter unit to be stationed in the area. Until this time, air defence over Darwin had been provided by the P-40s flown by the USAAF's 49th Fighter Group. No. 77 Squadron moved to another of Darwin's satellite airfields, Livingstone, in September. Among its pilots was John Gorton, future Prime Minister of Australia. No. 77 Squadron saw action defending Darwin from Japanese air raids and claimed its first aerial victory just after 5 a.m. on 23 November 1942, when Cresswell destroyed a Mitsubishi "Betty" bomber. It was the first "kill" for an Australian squadron over the mainland, and the first night victory over Australia. As of 24 December, the unit's strength was twenty-four Kittyhawks.

In February 1943, concurrent with No. 1 Wing and its three Supermarine Spitfire squadrons becoming operational in the Darwin area, No. 77 Squadron was transferred to Milne Bay in New Guinea. Along with Nos. 6, 75 and 100 Squadrons it came under the control of the newly formed No. 71 Wing, which was part of No. 9 Operational Group, the RAAF's main mobile formation in the South West Pacific Area. No. 77 Squadron registered its first daytime victory on 11 April, when a Kittyhawk shot down a Mitsubishi Zero taking part in a raid on Allied shipping near Buna. Three days later the Japanese attacked Milne Bay; the squadron claimed four bombers and a fighter for the loss of one Kittyhawk. By this time, Allied headquarters had finalised plans for a drive north to the Philippines involving heavy attacks on Rabaul and the occupation of territory in New Guinea, New Britain and the Solomon Islands.

No. 77 Squadron began moving to Goodenough Island in May 1943, and was fully established and ready for operations by 15 June. As Japanese fighter opposition was limited, the squadron took part in several ground-attack missions in New Britain, armed with incendiary and general-purpose bombs, a practice that had been employed by Kittyhawk units in the Middle East. During one such raid on 2 August, Cresswell's designated successor as commanding officer, Flight Lieutenant Daryl Sproule, was forced to crash-land on a beach and was captured and executed by the Japanese. Cresswell remained in command until Squadron Leader "Buster" Brown took over on 20 August. Japanese fighter strength in New Britain and New Guinea increased in September and October, and eight of No. 77 Squadron's Kittyhawks were briefly detached to Nadzab as escorts for the CAC Boomerangs of No. 4 Squadron, which were supporting the 7th Australian Division.

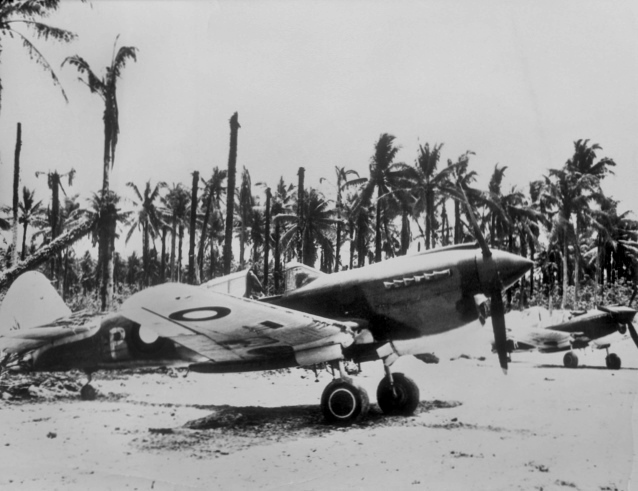
No. 77 Squadron Kittyhawks at Milne Bay, 1943

In January 1944, No. 77 Squadron took part in the two largest raids mounted by the RAAF to that time, each involving over seventy aircraft attacking targets in New Britain. It was subsequently assigned to Los Negros in the Admiralty Islands, joining Nos. 76 and 79 Squadrons under No. 73 Wing. No. 77 Squadron's ground party went ashore at Los Negros on 6 March, in the middle of a firefight with Japanese forces. Fourteen of the squadron's Kittyhawks arrived a week later, and another ten on 28 March. Their primary duty was providing air cover for Allied shipping, though no Japanese aircraft were encountered; they also flew ground-attack missions in support of US troops on Manus Island. Following the capture of the Admiralties, which completed the isolation of Rabaul, No. 77 Squadron remained with No. 73 Wing on garrison duty at Los Negros from May to July 1944.

Between 13 August and 14 September 1944, the squadron transferred to Noemfoor in western New Guinea to join Nos. 76 and 82 Squadrons as part of No. 81 Wing under No. 10 Operational Group (later the Australian First Tactical Air Force), which had taken over the mobile role previously performed by No. 9 Group and was supporting the American landings along the north coast of New Guinea. Cresswell, now a wing commander, arrived for his second tour of duty as commanding officer on 26 September. Operating P-40N Kittyhawks, No. 77 Squadron bombed Japanese positions on the Vogelkop Peninsula in October and on Halmahera in November. Cresswell handed over command in March 1945. The squadron moved to Morotai on 13 April and conducted ground-attack sorties over the Dutch East Indies until 30 June, when it redeployed with No. 81 Wing to Labuan to support the 9th Australian Division in North Borneo until hostilities ended in August 1945. The squadron's tally of aerial victories during the war was seven aircraft destroyed and four "probables", for the loss of eighteen pilots killed.

=== Occupation of Japan ===
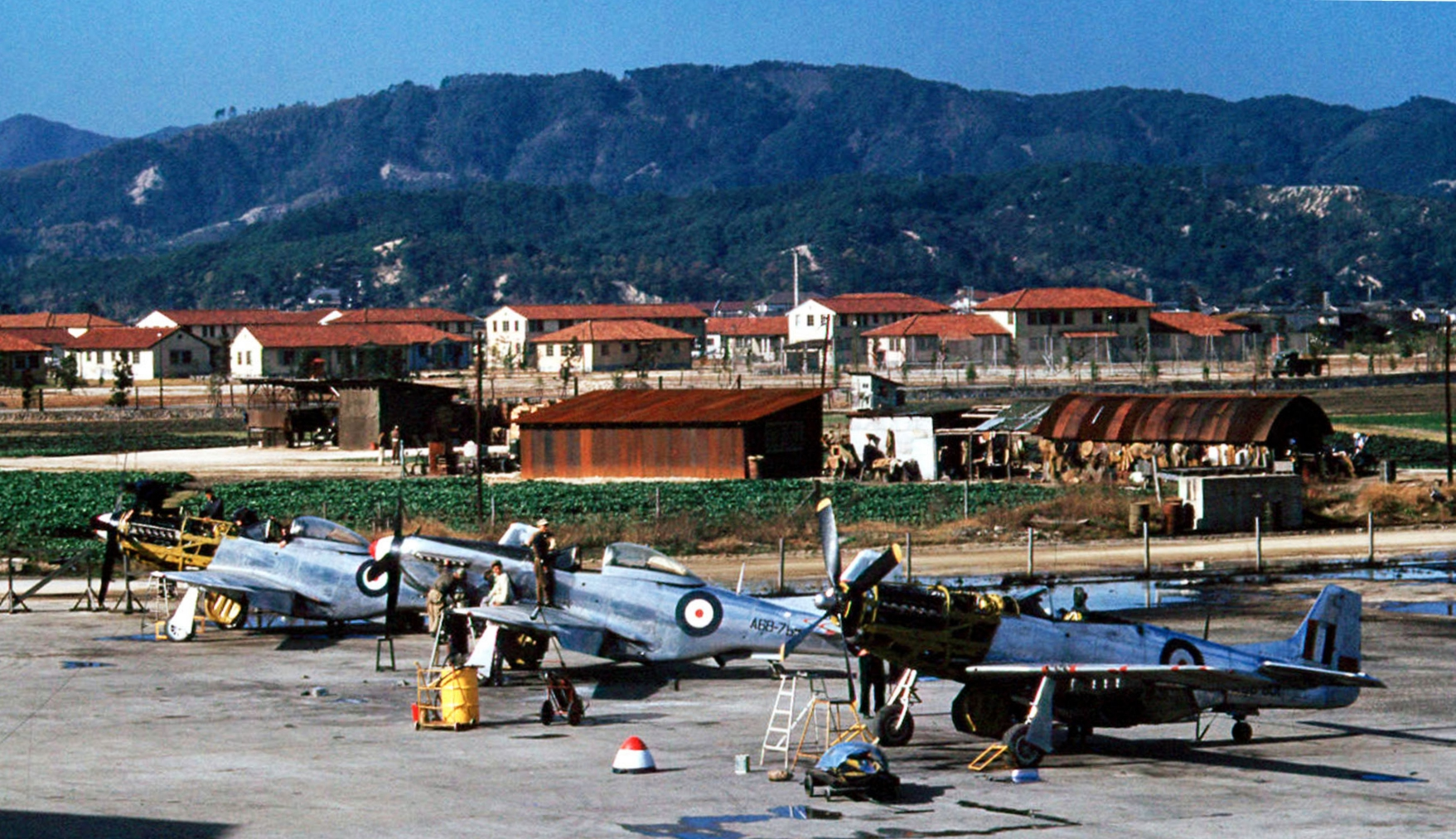
No. 77 Squadron P-51 Mustang fighters undergoing maintenance at Iwakuni, Japan, c. 1950

No. 77 Squadron began re-equipping with North American P-51 Mustangs at Labuan in September 1945. In the wake of Japan's surrender, No. 81 Wing became part of Australia's contribution to the British Commonwealth Occupation Force (BCOF). No. 77 Squadron was the last of the wing's three flying units to deploy to Japan, arriving at Bofu, a former kamikaze base, on 21 March 1946. No. 481 (Maintenance) Squadron provided technical service for the Mustangs. Occupation duties proved uneventful, the main operational task being surveillance patrols, but units maintained an intensive training regime and undertook combined exercises with other Allied forces. Many RAAF personnel were accompanied to Japan by their families.

No. 81 Wing transferred to Iwakuni in April 1948, the same month that the Federal government decided to reduce Australia's contribution to BCOF, retaining only No. 77 Squadron in Japan. Wing headquarters and No. 481 Squadron disbanded in November 1948, and No. 77 Squadron came under the aegis of a new organisation called RAAF Component. The squadron was now the largest operational unit in the RAAF, with a strength of 299 officers and men, forty Mustangs, three CAC Wirraways, two Douglas C-47 Dakotas and two Austers. The Dakotas and Austers formed the No. 77 Squadron Communications Flight. In December 1949, the Mustangs competed in a gunnery competition against three groups of Mustangs and two groups of F-80 Shooting Star jets belonging to the US Far East Air Force (FEAF). No. 77 Squadron's Flight Lieutenant "Bay" Adams achieved the highest individual score of the competition, earning the personal congratulations of Lieutenant Generals George E. Stratemeyer, commander of FEAF, and Horace Robertson, commander of BCOF. The RAAF personnel were preparing to return to Australia when, on 25 June 1950, they were placed on standby for action in the Korean War, which had just broken out.

=== Korean War ===
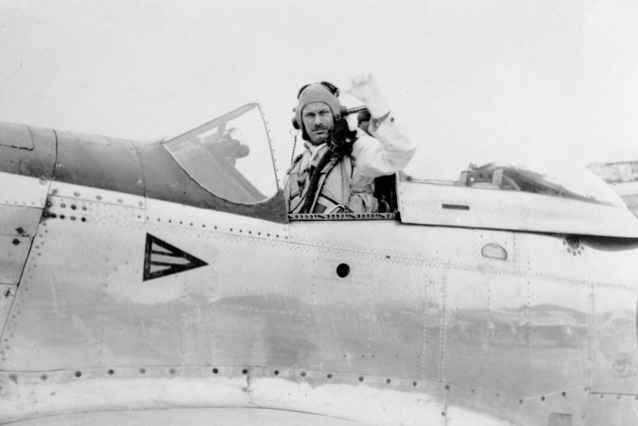
Wing Commander Lou Spence, commanding No. 77 Squadron, before a mission over Korea, August 1950

Led by Wing Commander Lou Spence, No. 77 Squadron was committed to action over Korea as part of United Nations Command (UN), and came under the operational control of the US Fifth Air Force. The Australian unit was specifically requested by General Douglas MacArthur, commander of UN forces; the Mustang was considered the best long-range ground-attack aircraft in the theatre, and Stratemeyer contended that No. 77 Squadron was the best Mustang outfit in Japan. The squadron flew its initial escort and patrol sorties from Iwakuni on 2 July 1950, becoming the first non-American UN unit to commence operations. Several Australian families were still living at Iwakuni pending their repatriation from what had become an operational theatre, and could watch the Mustangs depart for missions over Korea.

A friendly fire incident occurred on 3 July 1950, when No. 77 Squadron attacked a train full of US and South Korean troops on the main highway between Suwon and Pyongtaek, inflicting many casualties, twenty-nine of them fatal. Spence had raised concerns before the mission that the North Koreans could not have penetrated so far south, but was assured by Fifth Air Force controllers that the target was correct; the incident was widely reported in US newspapers but a public statement by Stratemeyer cleared the RAAF of any blame. No. 77 Squadron did not encounter enemy aircraft in the opening phase of the war but often faced intense ground fire. It suffered its first fatality on 7 July when its deputy commander, Squadron Leader Graham Strout, was killed during a raid on Samchok. He was also the first Australian, and the first non-American UN serviceman, to die in Korea.

For the next two months, equipped with bombs, rockets and napalm, No. 77 Squadron supported UN troops retreating before the North Korean advance. To expedite turnaround times between missions, the Mustangs, which were still based at Iwakuni, often refuelled and rearmed at Taegu near the Pusan Perimeter, where UN forces made a last-ditch stand on the southern tip of Korea. One of the squadron's Dakotas regularly flew between Iwakuni and Taegu carrying ordnance and spare parts. According to the official history of the Air Force in 1946–71, the squadron's part in the victory at Pusan earned recognition "not only for the RAAF but also Australia at the highest political levels in the United States". During a visit to Japan in August 1950, Prime Minister Robert Menzies presented the Gloucester Cup to No. 77 Squadron as the RAAF's most proficient unit of the past year. That month, the squadron claimed thirty-five tanks, 212 other vehicles, eighteen railway engines or cars, and thirteen fuel or ammunition dumps destroyed.

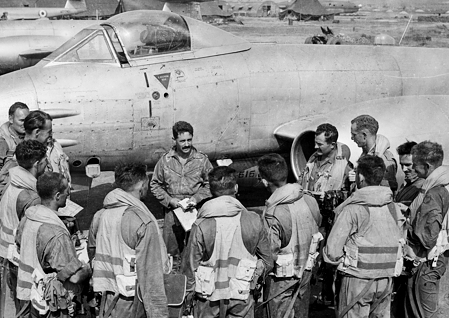
Squadron Leader Dick Cresswell (centre), on his third tour commanding No. 77 Squadron, briefs Meteor pilots at Kimpo before a mission over North Korea, August 1951

On 3 September 1950, Sergeant Bill Harrop was forced down behind enemy lines and executed by the North Koreans. Six days later, Spence was killed when his Mustang failed to pull out of a dive during a napalm attack on Angang-ni. His death was a serious blow to the squadron, and the RAAF despatched Cresswell on his third tour as commanding officer to replace him. Cresswell arrived at Iwakuni on 17 September and set about restoring morale, undertaking four sorties on his first day of operations three days later. MacArthur had meanwhile launched an amphibious landing behind North Korean lines at Inchon on 15 September, forcing the communists to retreat from the Pusan Perimeter. No. 77 Squadron was transferred from Iwakuni to Pohang, South Korea, on 12 October, to support UN forces advancing northwards. On 20 October, the squadron became a component of the RAAF's newly established No. 91 (Composite) Wing, which also included No. 391 (Base) Squadron, No. 491 (Maintenance) Squadron, and No. 30 Communications Flight, formerly the No. 77 Squadron Communications Flight. The wing and all units except No. 77 Squadron, which came under the operational control of the US 35th Fighter-Interceptor Group, were headquartered at Iwakuni.

China entered the war in mid-October 1950, attacking advancing UN troops as they closed in on the Yalu River. No. 77 Squadron undertook its first sorties against Chinese ground forces on 1 November. The squadron flew its first missions supporting the Australian Army on 5 November, when it attacked Chinese troops opposing the 3rd Battalion, Royal Australian Regiment, at Pakchon. No. 77 Squadron personnel were housed in tents in freezing conditions at Pohung; two pilots died from burns after a fire in their quarters on 14 November. Two days later the Australians began moving forward with the 35th Group to Yonpo Airfield, near Hamhung. North Korea's counter-attack, supported by Chinese forces, led to the squadron being withdrawn to Pusan on 3 December 1950. The communists operated a Russian-designed swept-wing jet fighter, the Mikoyan-Gurevich MiG-15, that was far superior to all other fighters in the theatre except the new North American F-86 Sabre. Although the MiGs carried Chinese or North Korean markings, they were frequently operated by seasoned Soviet air force pilots, whose deployment was unofficial, as the Soviet Union was not a combatant in the Korean War.

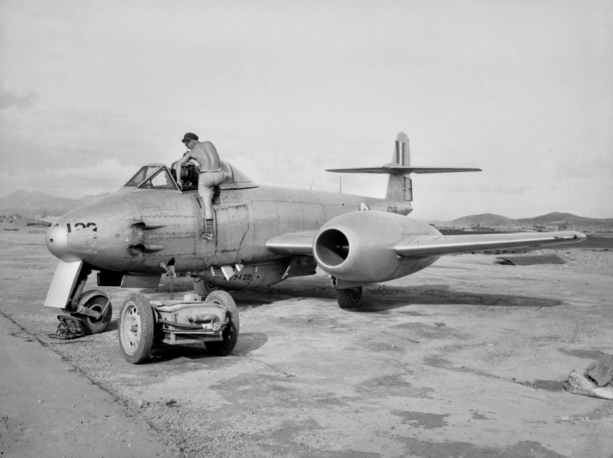
No. 77 Squadron Meteor at Kimpo preparing for a bomber escort mission over North Korea, 1951

The RAAF attempted to procure Sabres to replace No. 77 Squadron's Mustangs, but the priority being given to re-equipping the USAF meant that deliveries would not be possible until 1954. The Australian government agreed to purchase Gloster Meteor straight-wing jet fighters from Britain as the only viable alternative; the initial order included thirty-six single-seat Mk.8 interceptors and four two-seat Mk.7 trainers. No. 77 Squadron completed its last Mustang mission on 6 April 1951 and returned to Iwakuni the next day to begin converting to Meteors. It subsequently transferred to Kimpo, South Korea, and commenced operations with its new aircraft on 29 July. The squadron deployed twenty-two Meteors at Kimpo, and came under the control of the USAF's 4th Fighter-Interceptor Wing. Although it had operated effectively as a ground-attack unit with its Mustangs, No. 77 Squadron's primary role in the RAAF was interception, and it was expected that with the Meteor it could again focus on fighter duties, particularly as by this stage the USAF had only two squadrons of Sabres in the theatre.

Wing Commander Gordon Steege succeeded Cresswell on 16 August 1951, by which time No. 77 Squadron's Meteors had conducted offensive sweeps up the Yalu River with USAF Sabres, and escorted Boeing B-29 Superfortresses on bombing missions. MiG-15s had appeared on several occasions without engaging the Meteors; it was speculated at the time, and subsequently confirmed, that they had been observing the performance of the newly arrived RAAF jets. No. 77 Squadron's first Meteor fatalities occurred on 22 August, when two aircraft collided in mid-air as they returned to Kimpo after a sweep. The Meteors first engaged MiG-15s on 25 August, but scored no hits. Four days later, eight Meteors and sixteen Sabres fought twelve MiGs; one RAAF pilot ejected when his aircraft was shot down, and a second Meteor was badly damaged. One week later another Meteor suffered severe damage in a dogfight with MiGs. As a result of these clashes, Steege became convinced that the Meteor was outclassed as a fighter. Following discussions with the Fifth Air Force, he decided to take No. 77 Squadron out of its air-to-air combat role and curtail its operations in "MiG Alley", the area between the Yalu and Chongchon Rivers on North Korea's border with Manchuria. This caused controversy among those who believed that proper tactics exploiting the Meteor's manoeuvrability and heavy armament would have allowed it to remain competitive as a fighter; for the Australian pilots the change of role amounted to a loss of prestige. The Chief of the Air Staff, Air Marshal George Jones, backed the decision, which relegated the squadron mainly to escort duty and local air defence. Morale suffered and it was not until Wing Commander Ron Susans succeeded Steege on 26 December 1951 that the Meteors were once more assigned an offensive role, namely ground attack.

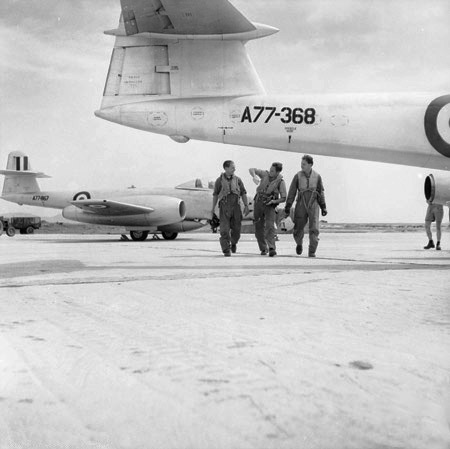
No. 77 Squadron pilots and their Meteors at Kunsan, South Korea, June 1954. The nose section of aircraft A77-368 later went on display at the Australian War Memorial, Canberra.

In the intervening period, Flight Lieutenant "Smoky" Dawson registered No. 77 Squadron's first jet combat claim when he damaged a MiG during an escort mission near Anju, North Korea, on 26 September 1951. On 27 October, Flying Officer Les Reading was credited with damaging another MiG while covering B-29s over Sinanju; it was subsequently confirmed as having been destroyed, making it the squadron's first MiG "kill". The squadron was awarded the Republic of Korea Presidential Unit Citation for "exceptionally meritorious service & heroism" on 1 November. On 1 December 1951, over Sunchon, at least twenty Soviet-piloted MiGs from the 176th Guards Fighter Air Regiment (176 GvIAP) attacked a formation of fourteen Meteors. Both sides apparently overestimated the scale of the battle and the damage inflicted to their opponents: three Meteors—one flown by Pilot Officer Vance Drummond—were lost, but Soviet pilots claimed nine destroyed; Australian pilots claimed one MiG shot down and another damaged, from a formation of at least forty, though Russian sources suggest that all the MiGs returned to base and less than twenty-five were available to 176 GvIAP at the time.

On 8 January 1952, Susans led the squadron on its first ground-attack mission in Meteors, which were armed with eight rockets under the wings as well as their four internal 20 mm cannon, at Chongdan. They continued to operate mainly in the ground-attack role until the end of the war, but registered two more victories over MiGs near Pyongyang on 4 and 8 May 1952. The squadron took part in a mass air strike on 29 August, when 420 UN aircraft attacked Pyongyang. One Meteor was shot down and another damaged by MiGs following a ground-attack mission on 2 October 1952. The squadron played a leading role in the destruction of a large North Korean convoy on 16 March 1953: two Meteors discovered a line of some 140 vehicles in a mountain pass south of Wonsan, halted it by destroying trucks at the front and rear of the convoy, and then called in further support from Kimpo and the USAF. The Australian aircraft eventually claimed twenty-four trucks out of a total of ninety vehicles destroyed or damaged by UN forces. No. 77 Squadron was credited with downing its last MiG southeast of Pyongyang on 27 March. Squadron Leader Len McGlinchey became its final wartime fatality when his Meteor crashed while taking off from Kimpo on 16 July.

Following the Korean Armistice Agreement on 27 July 1953, the squadron remained in South Korea on garrison duties—initially at Kimpo, later at Kunsan—until transferring to Iwakuni on 12 October 1954. It departed for Australia on 19 November and arrived in Sydney on 3 December, having been based overseas for eleven years, a record for an RAAF unit. Its performance in the early days of the war has been cited as a factor in the United States' decision to ratify the ANZUS treaty in September 1951. The squadron's casualty rate in Korea was twenty-five percent killed or captured. Forty-one pilots died, thirty-five from the RAAF and six on exchange from the Royal Air Force. A further seven pilots became prisoners of war. Aircraft losses totalled almost sixty, including over forty Meteors, mostly to ground fire. The squadron flew 18,872 sorties: 3,872 in Mustangs and 15,000 in Meteors. It was credited with shooting down five MiG-15s and destroying 3,700 buildings, 1,408 vehicles, ninety-eight railway engines and carriages, and sixteen bridges.

=== Malayan Emergency and Konfrontasi ===
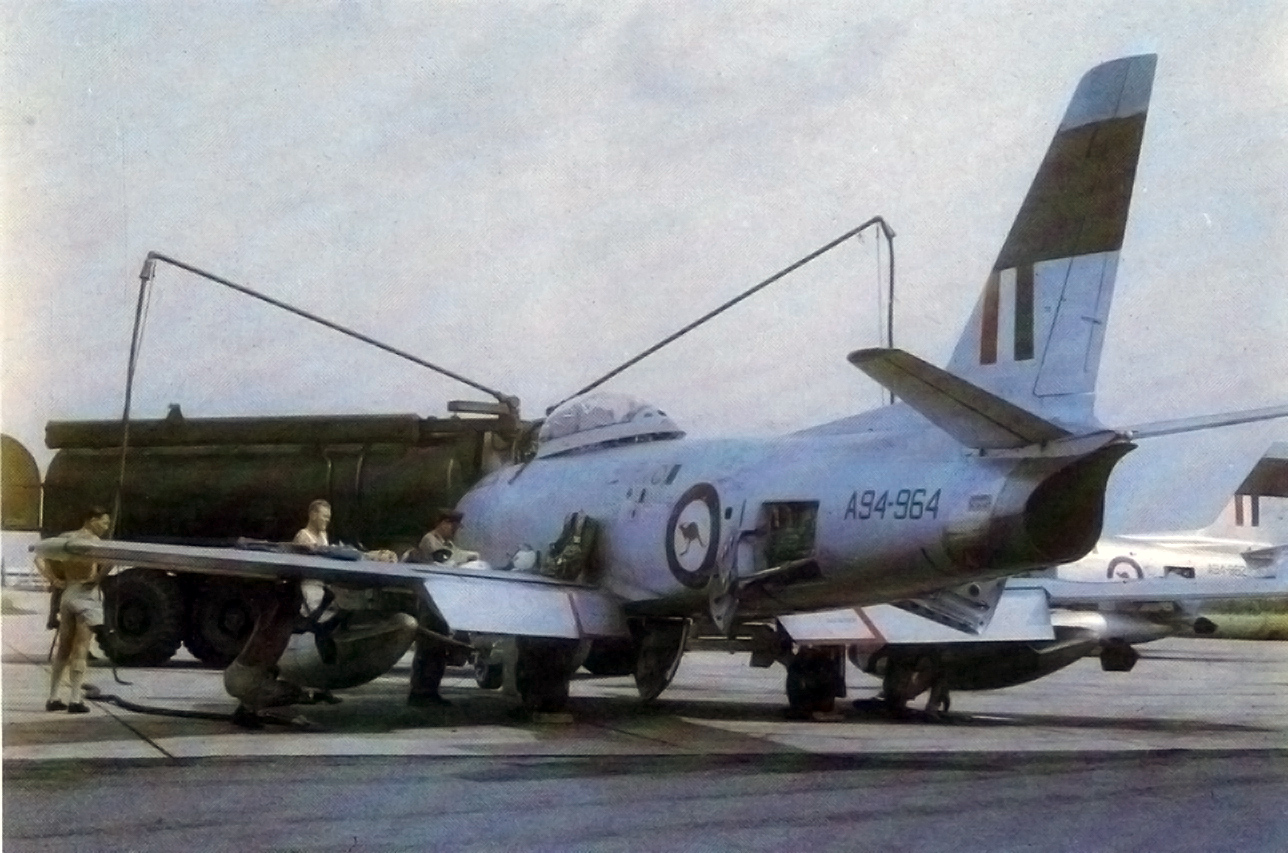
RAAF Sabres in Thailand, c. 1962

No. 77 Squadron became operational at RAAF Base Williamtown, New South Wales, on 4 January 1955. On 21 March, it joined Nos. 3 and 75 Squadrons as part of No. 78 Wing, which had recently been reorganised following garrison duty in Malta. No. 77 Squadron ceased Meteor operations in August 1956 and re-formed on 19 November equipped with CAC Sabres. Between October 1958 and February 1959, Nos. 3 and 77 Squadrons deployed with No. 78 Wing to RAAF Butterworth in Malaya, to support Commonwealth forces in the Emergency. The Sabres were among the first to wear the RAAF's recently introduced "leaping kangaroo" roundel. No. 478 (Maintenance) Squadron provided servicing for the aircraft. No. 77 Squadron undertook its first mission dive-bombing communist guerrillas on 13 August 1959, and flew two more ground-attack sorties on 10 June 1960. The RAAF pilots also sometimes tried to startle the communists by diving their jets through the sound barrier to create sonic booms that simulated the sound of artillery fire. Two No. 77 Squadron Sabres collided in mid-air on 22 July, but both pilots ejected safely. The Emergency was declared officially over on 31 July 1960.

The RAAF squadrons remained at Butterworth as part of Australia's contribution to the Commonwealth Strategic Reserve. Eight Sabres, along with their pilots and ground crew, were detached from No. 77 Squadron in May 1962 to re-form No. 79 Squadron at Ubon, Thailand. The Sabres were flown to Thailand via Singapore to give the appearance that they were not drawn from the Strategic Reserve, thus preserving Malaysia's neutrality. Personnel and equipment from Nos. 3 and 77 Squadrons continued to rotate through No. 79 Squadron on a regular basis. The Butterworth-based Sabres, armed with Sidewinder missiles, were responsible for regional air defence during the Konfrontasi between Indonesia and Malaysia from July 1963 until August 1966, though no combat took place. From 26 October until 27 November 1965, a detachment of six Sabres from No. 77 Squadron was based at Labuan to conduct combat patrols over the Indonesian–Malaysian border on Borneo. Following the disbandment of No. 78 Wing on 1 November 1967, No. 77 Squadron became an independently operating unit under the command of Headquarters RAAF Butterworth.

=== Supersonic era ===
No. 77 Squadron returned to Williamtown in early 1969 to re-equip with Dassault Mirage III supersonic fighters, undertaking its initial flights on 7 July. The Mirages were charged with interception, high- and low-angle bombing, close air support, and photo reconnaissance; their armament included 30 mm cannon, Sidewinder missiles and conventional bombs. No. 77 Squadron's prime role was ground attack, although none of the RAAF's Mirages ever saw combat. No. 481 Squadron was responsible for day-to-day servicing, as well as most heavy maintenance. No. 77 Squadron suffered its first fatal Mirage accident on 3 April 1973, when an aircraft crashed during a training flight at low altitude. Another pilot was killed when his Mirage hit the water during formation flying at night on 24 June 1976. The squadron began training with laser-guided bombs in October 1980. As of March 1984, its aircraft complement was nineteen Mirages. Two pilots died following a mid-air collision at low level on 9 April that year.

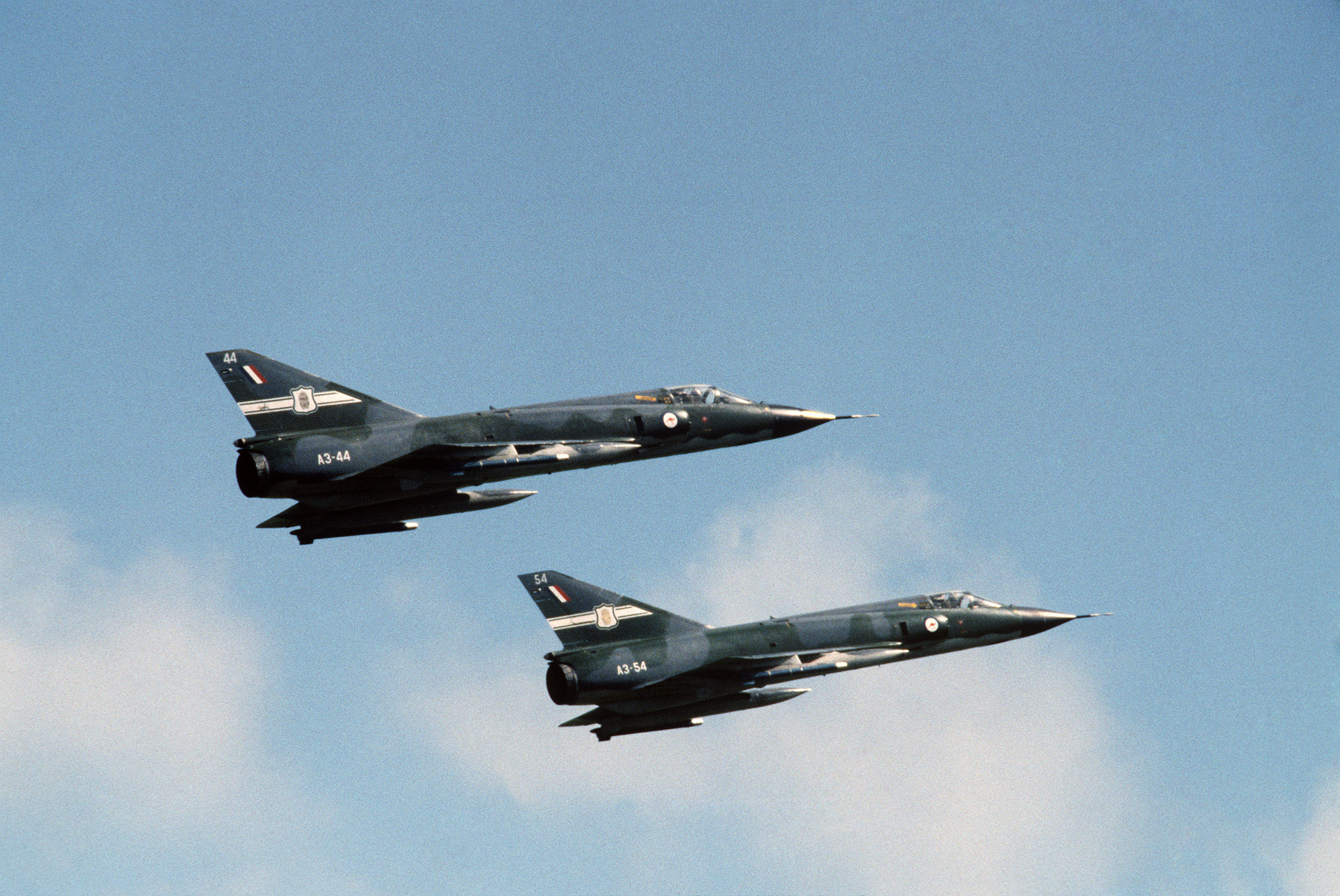
No. 77 Squadron Mirages, September 1984

On 1 January 1985, in preparation for the introduction of the McDonnell Douglas F/A-18 Hornet to Australian service, No. 77 Squadron took over all Mirages and Macchi MB-326s of No. 2 Operational Conversion Unit, assuming responsibility for fighter combat instructor, introductory fighter, and Mirage conversion courses. The transfer swelled the squadron's strength to fifty-six aircraft—forty Mirages and sixteen Macchis—and over 500 officers and men, making it the largest operational unit in the RAAF. Along with a heavily expanded training program, and its existing Australian Army close support role, No. 77 Squadron's fleet support commitment was increased to take up the slack resulting from the diminution of the Royal Australian Navy's fixed-wing capability. Its last fatal accident with the Mirage occurred on 2 May 1986; the aircraft crashed into water during air-to-air gunnery practice.

The squadron began phasing out the Mirage in July 1986, and took delivery of its first Hornet on 29 June 1987. It had come under the control of a newly re-formed No. 81 Wing that February. No. 77 Squadron's last Mirage departed Williamtown on 27 November 1987. Hornet maintenance at Williamtown was the responsibility of No. 481 Wing, which had evolved from No. 481 Squadron. One of No. 77 Squadron's Hornets crashed near Rockhampton, Queensland, on 19 May 1992, killing the pilot and his passenger, a defence scientist. In September that year, the squadron undertook a proving exercise over Halifax Bay in Far North Queensland, when four of its Hornets—refuelled in flight on the round trip from Williamtown by a Boeing 707 tanker—became the first jet aircraft in Australia to drop aerial mines. No. 481 Wing was reorganised as No. 402 Wing in July 1996; the latter transferred its functions to No. 81 Wing's flying squadrons in July 1998.

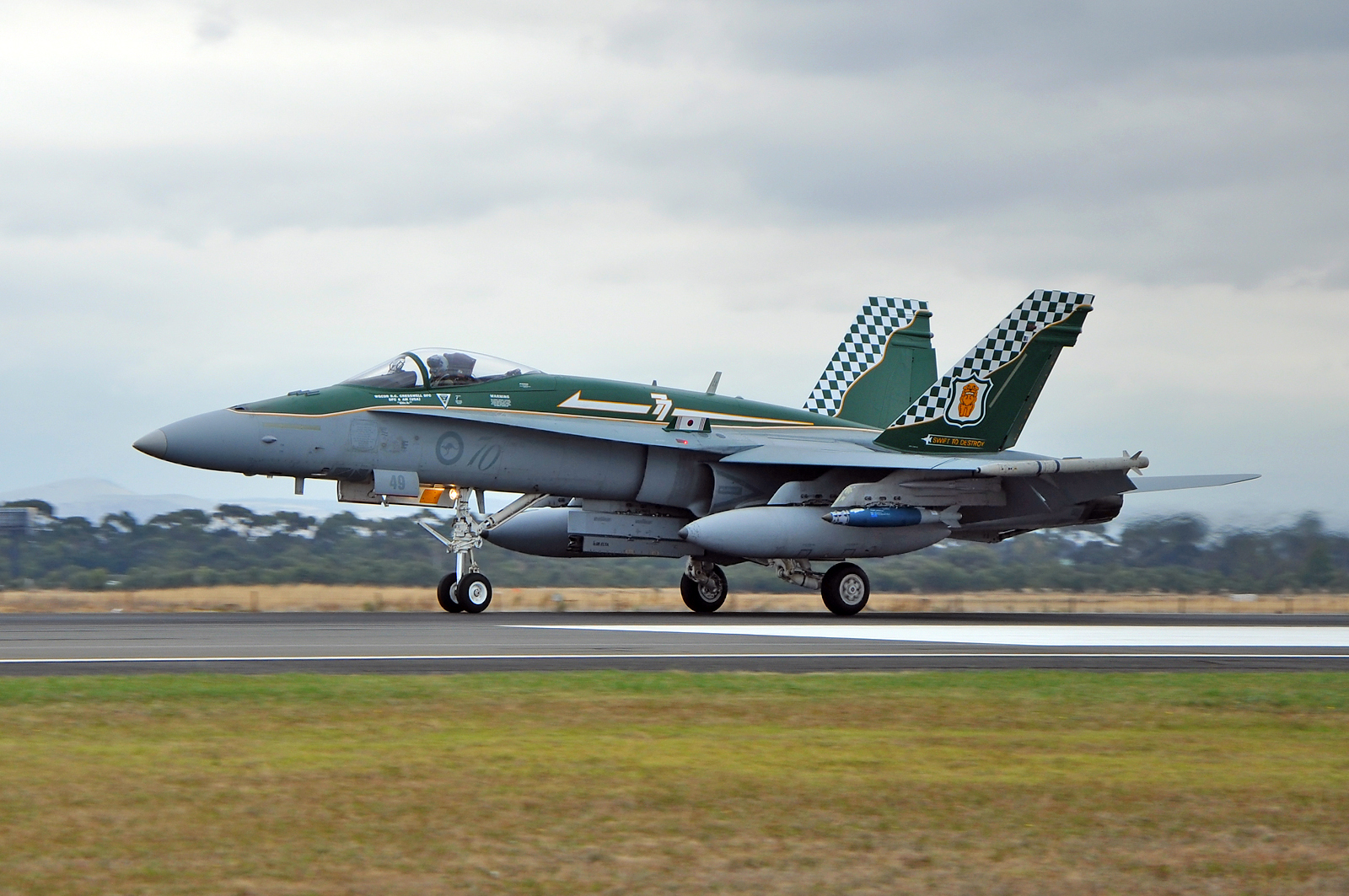
No. 77 Squadron F/A-18 Hornet in 70th anniversary livery at the Avalon Airshow, Avalon, Victoria, 2013

No. 77 Squadron operated a detachment of Pilatus PC-9 aircraft in the forward air control role from 2000 until 2003; this role was subsequently filled by the Forward Air Control Development Unit. Four Hornets from No. 77 Squadron were deployed to protect the US base at Diego Garcia in the Indian Ocean between November 2001 and February 2002, during the early phase of the war in Afghanistan. In March 2006, the squadron sent a detachment of aircraft to RAAF Base East Sale, Victoria, to assist with security for the Commonwealth Games being held in Melbourne. No. 77 Squadron deployed to the Middle East in October 2015 as part of Operation Okra, Australia's contribution to the war against the Islamic State; by the end of the year it had flown twenty-one strike missions over Syria. A rotation from No. 3 Squadron replaced No. 77 Squadron's contingent in the first half of 2016. Each of No. 81 Wing's fighter squadron's deployed at least once to the Middle East; No. 77 Squadron's second and final rotation began in January 2017, when it took over from a No. 75 Squadron contingent. No. 77 Squadron returned to Williamtown in May, bringing its total deployment period to ten months.

In December 2017, No. 77 Squadron was assigned all of No. 3 Squadron's Hornets and most of its personnel when the latter unit was re-formed to operate the Lockheed Martin F-35A Lightning II multi-role stealth fighter; the aircraft and personnel were assigned to a newly established "C" Flight within No. 77 Squadron. No. 77 Squadron ceased flying Hornets on 11 December 2020. It began converting to the F-35 the following month. Deliveries of F-35s to No. 77 squadron continued through 2022.

== Battle honours ==
- World War II: Milne Bay, Morotai, Borneo 1945, New Guinea 1943–1944, Darwin 1942–1943, Dutch New Guinea, New Britain 1943
- Korean War: Korea 1950–1953
- Malayan Emergency and Konfrontasi: Malaya 1948–1960, Malaysia (Confrontation) 1962–1966

No. 77 Squadron F/A-18 Hornets over Nevada, US, during Exercise Red Flag, February 2014

== Aircraft operated ==
- Curtiss P-40 Kittyhawk (March 1942 – September 1945)
- North American P-51 Mustang (September 1945 – April 1951)
- Gloster Meteor (April 1951 – August 1956)
- CAC Sabre (November 1956 – July 1969)
- Dassault Mirage III (July 1969 – June 1987)
- Macchi MB-326 (January 1985 – June 1987)
- McDonnell Douglas F/A-18 Hornet (June 1987 – December 2020)
- Pilatus PC-9 (2000–2003)
- Lockheed Martin F-35 Lightning II (January 2021 –)

== See also ==
- McDonnell Douglas F/A-18 Hornet in Australian service
