= Peter McIntyre (Australian footballer) =

Australian rules footballer

Personal information
- Full name: Peter McIntyre
- Born: 6 January 1967 (age 59); Deniliquin, NSW, Australia
- Original teams: Deniliquin Rovers, Deniliquin
- Height: 194 cm (6 ft 4 in)
- Weight: 90 kg (198 lb)
- Position: Full Forward

Playing career^{1}
Years	Club	Games (Goals)
1991–1992	Adelaide	14 (19)
- ^{1} Playing statistics correct to the end of 1992.

Peter McIntyre (born 6 January 1967) is a former professional Australian rules footballer who played for the Adelaide Football Club in the Australian Football League (AFL).

From Deniliquin, New South Wales, McIntyre moved to Adelaide, playing with the South Adelaide Football Club in the South Australian National Football League (SANFL) before being recruited to the Adelaide Football Club in their entry into the Australian Football League in 1991. In Adelaide's first match McIntyre was an unlikely hero, kicking four goals in a large defeat of Hawthorn Football Club.

He kicked the second ever goal for the Adelaide Crows and played in their first ever game against Hawthorn Hawks.

As a key position player, he played 14 games for 19 goals before he was cut from the side at the end of 1992.

He is the son of 1950s and 1960s St Kilda Football Club player Barry McIntyre.

== Links ==
- Peter McIntyre profile via KB on Reflection
