= No. 2 Service Flying Training School RAAF =

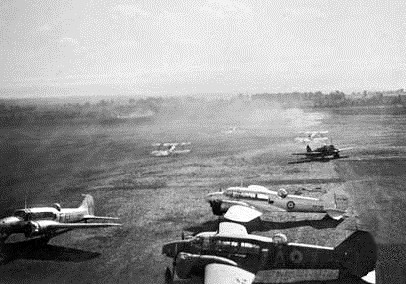
- No. 2 SFTS, c. September 1940: three Ansons (foreground) with a Wirraway (middle right) and three Tiger Moths (rear)
- Active: 1940–42
- Allegiance: Australia
- Branch: Royal Australian Air Force
- Role: Intermediate/advanced flying training
- Part of: No. 2 Training Group
- Garrison/HQ: RAAF Station Forest Hill
- Nickname(s): "Scherger's Concentration Camp"

Commanders
- Notable commanders: Frederick Scherger (1940–41); Charles Eaton (1941–42)

No. 2 Service Flying Training School (No. 2 SFTS) was a flying training school of the Royal Australian Air Force (RAAF) that operated during World War II. It was formed in July 1940, under the command of Wing Commander Frederick Scherger. Responsible for intermediate and advanced instruction of pilots under the Empire Air Training Scheme (EATS), the school was based at RAAF Station Forest Hill near Wagga Wagga, New South Wales, and operated CAC Wirraway and Avro Anson aircraft. The Ansons were phased out in July 1941, and the school became an all-Wirraway unit. In 1942 the RAAF divided the personnel and equipment of No. 2 SFTS between Nos. 5 and 7 Service Flying Training Schools at Uranquinty and Deniliquin, respectively. No. 2 SFTS was disbanded that April, and the base facilities taken over by No. 5 Aircraft Depot.

== History ==
RAAF aircrew training expanded dramatically following the outbreak of World War II, in response to Australia's participation in the Empire Air Training Scheme (EATS). The Air Force's pre-war flight training facility, No. 1 Flying Training School at RAAF Station Point Cook, Victoria, was supplanted in 1940–41 by twelve Elementary Flying Training Schools (EFTS), eight Service Flying Training Schools (SFTS), and Central Flying School (CFS). While CFS turned out new flight instructors, the EFTS provided basic training to prospective pilots who, if successful, would go on to SFTS for further instruction that focussed on operational (or "service") flying. The course at SFTS typically consisted of two streams, intermediate and advanced, and included such techniques as instrument flying, night flying, advanced aerobatics, formation flying, dive bombing, and aerial gunnery. The total duration of training varied during the war as demand for aircrew rose and fell. Initially running for 16 weeks, the course was cut to 10 weeks (which included 75 hours flying time) in October 1940. A year later it was raised to 12 weeks (including 100 hours flying time), and again to 16 weeks two months later. It continued to increase after this, peaking at 28 weeks in June 1944.

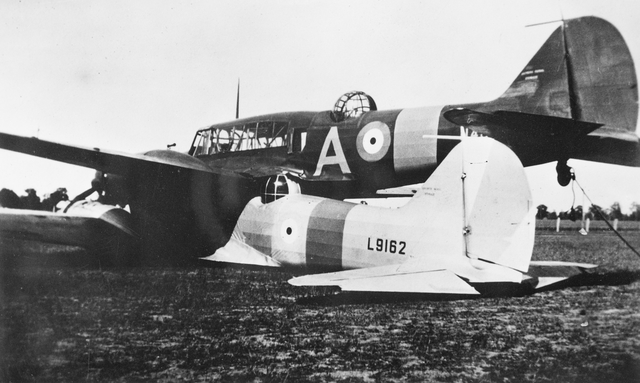
The two Avro Ansons from No. 2 SFTS that collided in mid-air, locked together, and were then landed safely in a paddock, 29 September 1940

No. 2 Service Flying Training School (No. 2 SFTS) was formed at RAAF Station Forest Hill, near Wagga Wagga, New South Wales, on 1 July 1940, and came under the control of No. 2 Training Group. Along with No. 5 Service Flying Training School and the later No. 1 Basic Flying Training School, at the neighbouring RAAF Station Uranquinty, No. 2 SFTS was one of the so-called "Wagga Flying Training Schools", which together graduated over 3,000 pilots in the 1940s and '50s. The unit's inaugural commanding officer was Wing Commander (subsequently Group Captain) Frederick Scherger, whose strict discipline and German ancestry quickly earned his establishment the nickname "Scherger's Concentration Camp". Scherger also served as station commander. One of the school's instructors was Flying Officer Bill Newton, later to be awarded the Victoria Cross for bombing raids in New Guinea.

Forest Hill was a new air base, and roads and buildings were still under construction when its first course of flying training commenced with Avro Ansons on 29 July 1940. One of the Ansons crashed in August, killing its instructor and a student. Later that month the second flying course began, on CAC Wirraways. The school was then reorganised into Initial and Advanced Squadrons. On 29 September, two Ansons collided in mid-air and became locked together. Both navigators bailed out, to be followed shortly afterwards by the injured pilot of the lower aircraft. The pilot of the upper Anson, however, found that he was able to control the interlocked aircraft using his ailerons and flaps, coupled with the engine power of the Anson underneath. He then managed to make a successful emergency landing in a paddock near the town of Brocklesby.

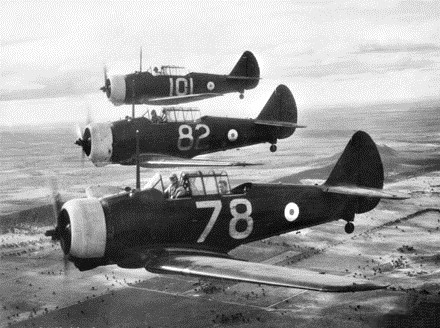
Wirraways of No. 2 SFTS, c. June 1941

No. 2 SFTS was reported as having achieved its nominal strength of 1,100 personnel, including 160 students, in October 1940. By this time up to 2,000 flights per month were said to be taking place, 150 of them at night, with instructors completing up to 90 hours flying time per week. The school underwent further reorganisation in February 1941 with the establishment of Intermediate Squadron; successful students from this unit were awarded their wings before proceeding to Advanced Squadron. Another new unit, Maintenance Squadron, formed in March. From this point on, No. 2 SFTS phased out its Ansons, as single-engined and multi-engined aircraft training was split up on orders of the RAAF Air Board. By the end of July, only Wirraways were in operation, their numbers eventually reaching 96. A Wirraway crashed during an instrument training flight on 29 August, killing both pilots. In October, Scherger was posted to take over RAAF Station Darwin, Northern Territory, from Group Captain Charles "Moth" Eaton, who in turn assumed command of No. 2 SFTS. Like Scherger, Eaton also served as Forest Hill's station commander.

Following the outbreak of the Pacific War in December 1941, the school's Wirraways were classified as Second Line (Reserve) aircraft in the defence of Australia, while the base was fortified with sandbags, trenches, and gun pits. On 1 January 1942, No. 60 Squadron was established at Forest Hill from No. 2 SFTS aircraft and personnel. Equipped with 18 Wirraways, the unit formed part of the expansion of the Australian military in response to the rapid Japanese advance in the first month of the Pacific War. A contingent of 68 WAAAFs also began arriving at Forest Hill in January.

The Air Board subsequently rationalised EATS facilities in southern New South Wales, dividing the staff and aircraft of No. 2 SFTS between Nos. 5 and 7 Service Flying Training Schools at nearby RAAF Stations Uranquinty and Deniliquin, respectively. Eaton remained in command of the school until shortly before its disbandment on 3 April 1942. No. 2 SFTS had suffered a total of four serious accidents in Ansons and eleven in Wirraways, resulting in the deaths of three instructors and four students. Out of some 600 entrants, just over 550 pilots graduated from the school, among them Clive Caldwell, later to become Australia's leading fighter ace of the war, and future Prime Minister John Gorton. No. 60 Squadron was also disbanded on 3 April, after a brief career during which its activities had been limited to training exercises. The base facilities were taken over by No. 5 Aircraft Depot, responsible for maintenance of RAAF airframes, engines and other equipment.
