= Deniliquin =

- Town
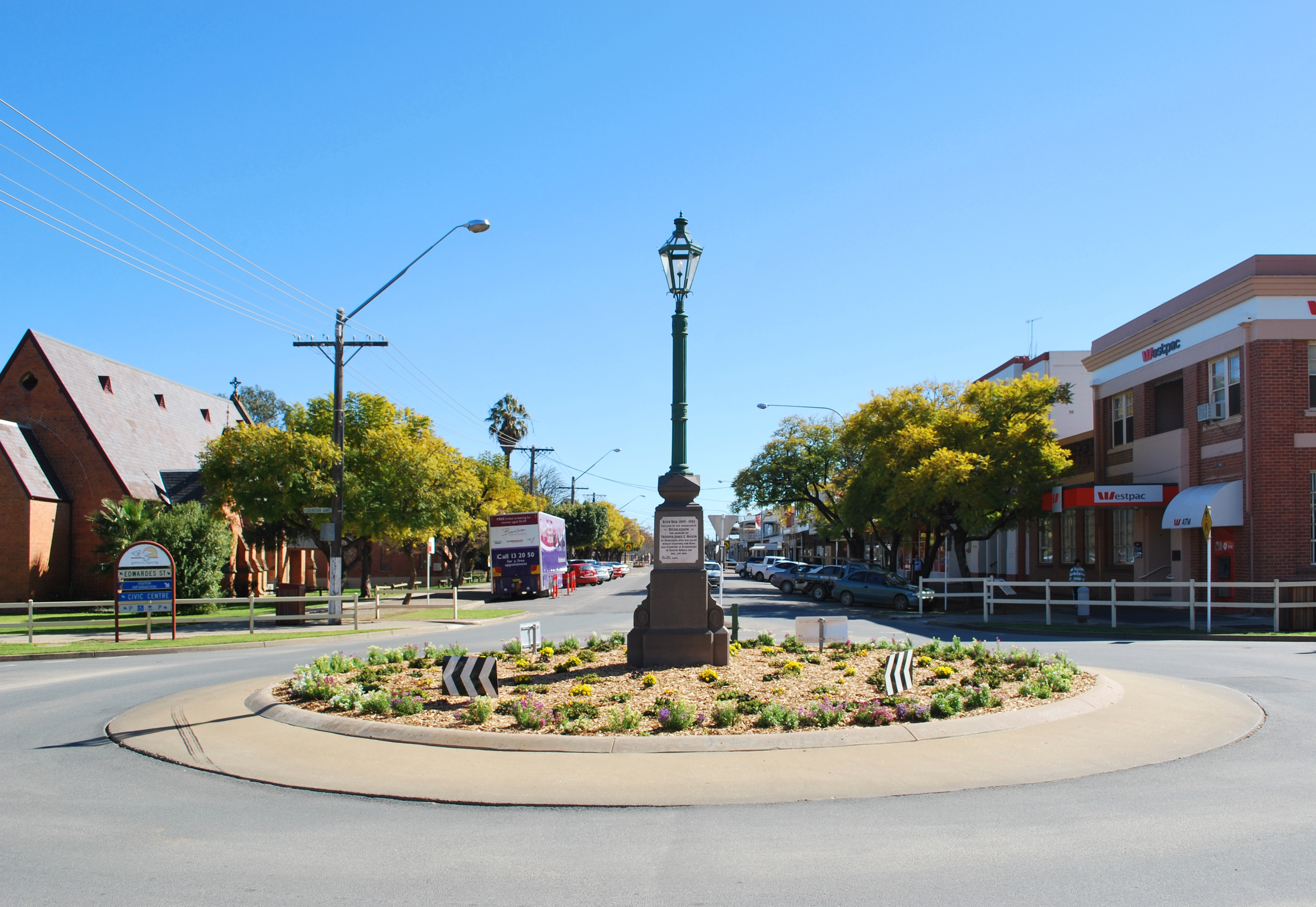
- Deniliquin town centre

- Coordinates: 35°31′47″S 144°57′25″E
- Country: Australia
- State: New South Wales
- LGA: Edward River Council
- Location: 724 km (450 mi) from Sydney; 284 km (176 mi) from Melbourne; 138 km (86 mi) from Shepparton (Victoria); 184 km (114 mi) from Bendigo (Victoria); 234 km (145 mi) from Griffith

Government
  - State electorate: Murray
  - Federal division: Farrer
- Elevation: 93.0 m (305.1 ft)

Population
  - Total: 6,431 (UCL 2021)
- Postcode: 2710
- County: Townsend
- Mean max temp: 23.6 °C (74.5 °F)
- Mean min temp: 9.5 °C (49.1 °F)
- Annual rainfall: 405.7 mm (15.97 in)

Deniliquin (/dəˈnɪlɪkwɪn/), also known by the local abbreviation "Deni" (/ˈdɛni/), is a town in the western Riverina region of south-western New South Wales, Australia, close to the border with Victoria. It is the largest town in the Edward River Council local government area.

Deniliquin is located at the intersection of the Riverina and Cobb Highway approximately 725 kilometres (450 mi) south west of the state capital, Sydney and 285 kilometres (177 mi) due north of Melbourne. The town is divided in two parts by the Edward River, an anabranch of the Murray River, with the main business district located on the south bank.

The town services a productive agricultural district with prominent dairy, rice, wool and timber industries. At the 2021 census, the population of Deniliquin was 6,431.

== Prehistory ==
Deniliquin is the namesake of the deeply buried Deniliquin multiple-ring structure, which is suggested to be at the core of a 320-mile diameter impact structure formed by a meteor strike over 400 million years ago, possibly responsible for the Late Ordovician mass extinction.

== History ==
Prior to European colonisation, the Indigenous Australian traditional owners of the Deniliquin area were the Barababaraba people.

In 1843, the entrepreneur and speculator Benjamin Boyd acquired land in the vicinity of present-day Deniliquin (probably via his agent Augustus Morris). The location was then known by colonists as The Sandhills. Although there are several origin stories for the name Deniliquin, the most common suggests Boyd (or Morris) named it after Denilakoon, a local Indigenous Elder, famed for his wrestling prowess. An inn and punt were established on the site between 1845 and 1847; the town site was surveyed in 1848, and gazetted in 1850. The original Native Police force of Frederick Walker was organised at Deniliquin in 1848. The Deniliquin Post Office opened on 1 January 1850.

In 1853, William John Wills of the Burke and Wills expedition worked as a shepherd at the Royal Bank sheep station near Deniliquin.

As Deniliquin was established on the convergence of major stock routes between the colonies of Queensland and New South Wales and the Victorian gold rush centres of Victoria, it soon became an important river crossing and the first bridge was built over the Edward River in 1861. The Deniliquin and Moama Railway Company built a private railway in 1879 to connect with Moama, across the Murray River from the busy river port of Echuca, connected by rail to Melbourne.

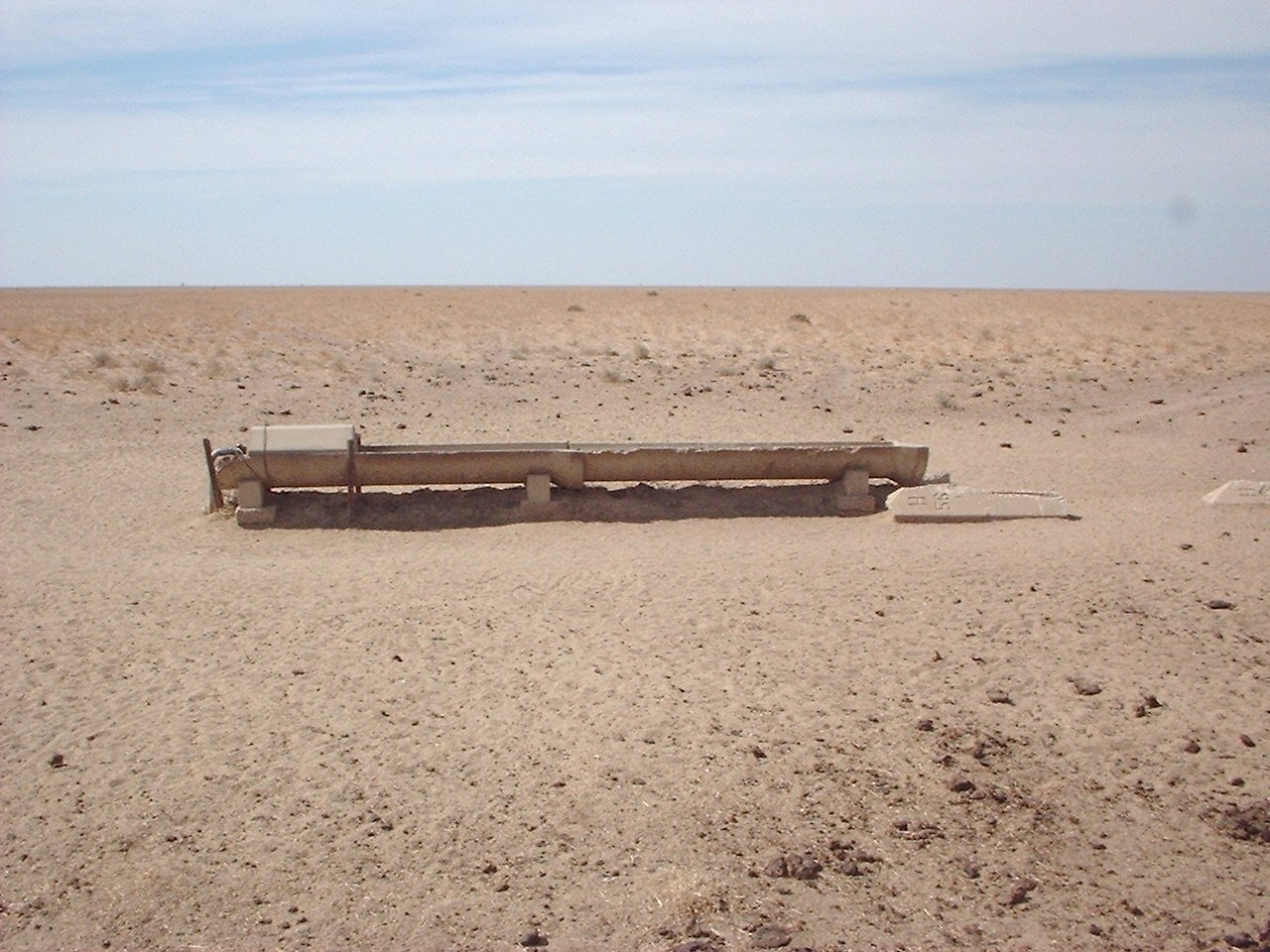
A water trough on a sheep farm 50 km north of Deniliquin

Wool growing quickly became a major industry and the area around Deniliquin was home to several Merino studs. In 1861, George Hall Peppin and his two sons, experienced English sheep breeders, established a Merino stud at Wanganella station, north of Deniliquin. There, the brothers developed the Peppin Merino, able to thrive in drier inland regions. The Australian Association of Stud Merino Breeders Limited reported that as many as 70% of Merinos in Australia are said to be directly descended from these sheep.

In the 1860s, Deniliquin was the centre of a short-lived campaign by wealthy pastoralists, including Peppin, George Desailly, Robert Landale and William Brodribb, for secession from New South Wales and the creation of a new Riverina colony. This campaign was supported by David Jones, proprietor of the local newspaper the Pastoral Times.

A Post Office was opened in Deniliquin on 1 January 1850. The first Telegraph Office was a privately constructed and operated office in concert with Moama. In March 1858, the Victorian Government had extended its telegraph line from Bendigo (Sandhurst) through Castlemaine to Echuca. The nearest New South Wales telegraph lines to the Echuca-Deniliquin area at that time were at Albury, Gundagai and Bathurst. Hence the pro-active citizens of Echuca and Deniliquin formed the Deniliquin and Echuca Telegraph Company and built and operated their own private line across the border to Echuca and Bendigo through to Melbourne and beyond from 24 March 1859. Finally, the NSW Government took the private company over and created its own offices and telegraph lines. The Government Telegraph Office at Deniliquin opened on 1 August 1861. It merged with the Post Office on 1 January 1870, before separating on 1 August 1875, and then getting back together on 29 June 1901.

On 19 December 1868, Deniliquin was constituted as the Municipality of Deniliquin, and the first municipal election was held on 23 February 1869. In 1993, the enactment of the Local Government Act (NSW) saw the name of the council changed from the Municipality of Deniliquin to the Deniliquin Council.

Large-scale irrigation schemes came to the Deniliquin area with the establishment of the Deniboota and Denimein Irrigation Districts in 1938 and the Berriquin Irrigation District in 1939, using water diverted from the Murray River at Lake Mulwala through the Mulwala Canal. An ample and reliable water supply led to the development of water-intensive industries such as rice growing.

During the Second World War, RAAF Station Deniliquin was home to No. 7 Service Flying Training School RAAF. It was also a final disbanding site for squadrons returning from active duty against the Japanese in the Pacific. No. 22 Squadron RAAF and No. 30 Squadron RAAF were disbanded here in 1946, and in 1945 and 1946 it was also a base for No. 78 Squadron RAAF before it was finally disbanded in Williamtown.

Also during World War II, Deniliquin was the location of RAAF No.15 Inland Aircraft Fuel Depot (IAFD), completed in 1942 and closed on 29 August 1944. Usually consisting of 4 tanks, 31 fuel depots were built across Australia for the storage and supply of aircraft fuel for the RAAF and the US Army Air Forces at a total cost of £900,000 ($1,800,000).

In April 2006, the Herald Sun reported on its front cover that the Edward River was dry, with an accompanying photograph showing a dry creek. This was later revealed to be erroneous; the photograph was of an unknown channel on a farm within 60 kilometres (37 mi) of Deniliquin, while the Edward River was in fact still running. Deniliquin Council and members of the Deniliquin community have since attempted to rectify the damage to local tourism by improving the profile of Deniliquin in various media outlets.

== Heritage listings ==
Deniliquin has a number of heritage-listed sites, including:

- Cressy Street (South): Old St Paul's Anglican Church
- Cressy Street: Waring Gardens
- 72 End Street: Deniliquin 12 Pounder Rifled Breech-Loading Gun
- 72 End Street: Deniliquin 75mm Field Gun
- George Street: Deniliquin Public School and School Master's Residence
- Poictiers Street: St Andrew's Uniting Church

== Population ==
Historical population
Year	Pop.	±%
1921	2,660	—
1933	3,192	+20.0%
1947	3,668	+14.9%
1954	4,704	+28.2%
1961	5,575	+18.5%
1966	6,277	+12.6%
1971	6,622	+5.5%
1976	6,865	+3.7%
1981	7,354	+7.1%
1986	7,566	+2.9%
1991	7,895	+4.3%
1996	7,816	−1.0%
2001	7,781	−0.4%
2006	7,431	−4.5%
2011	6,441	−13.3%
2016	6,833	+6.1%
2021	6,431	−5.9%
Source: Australian Bureau of Statistics data.

According to the 2021 census, there were 6,431 people in Deniliquin.

- Aboriginal and Torres Strait Islander people made up 5.6% of the population.
- 82.9% of people were born in Australia. The next most common countries of birth were England at 1.1%, New Zealand 0.9%, India 0.6%, Germany 0.3%, and the Philippines 0.3%.
- 86.8% of people spoke only English at home, the next most common languages spoken at home included Malayalam 0.3%, Sinhalese 0.2%, Cantonese 0.2%, Italian 0.2%, and Afrikaans 0.2%.
- The most common responses for religion were No Religion 37.4%, Catholic 21.8%, Anglican 14.6 and Uniting Church 6.5%; a further 10.5 per cent of respondents elected not to disclose their religion.

== Industry ==
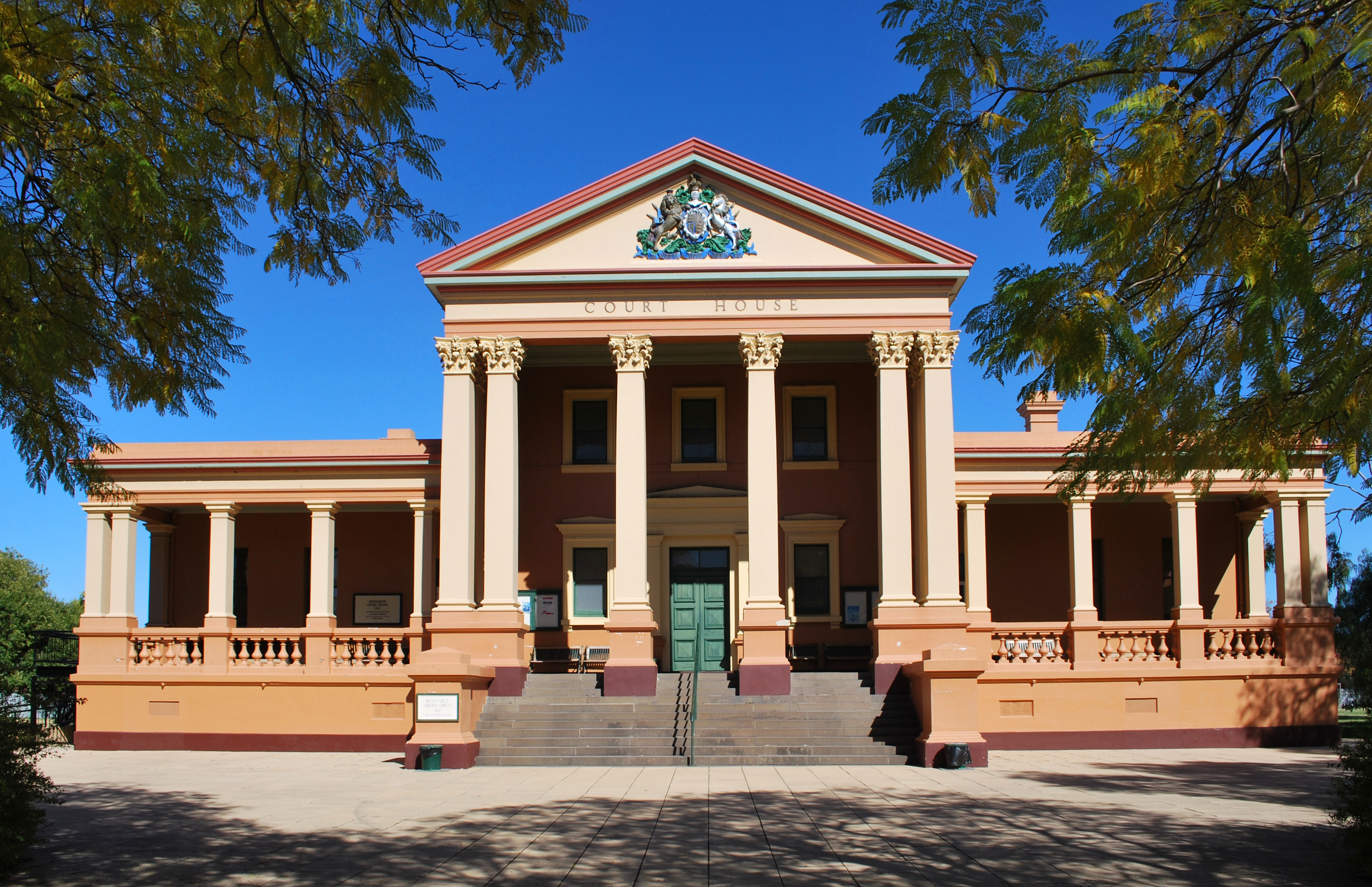
Deniliquin Court house

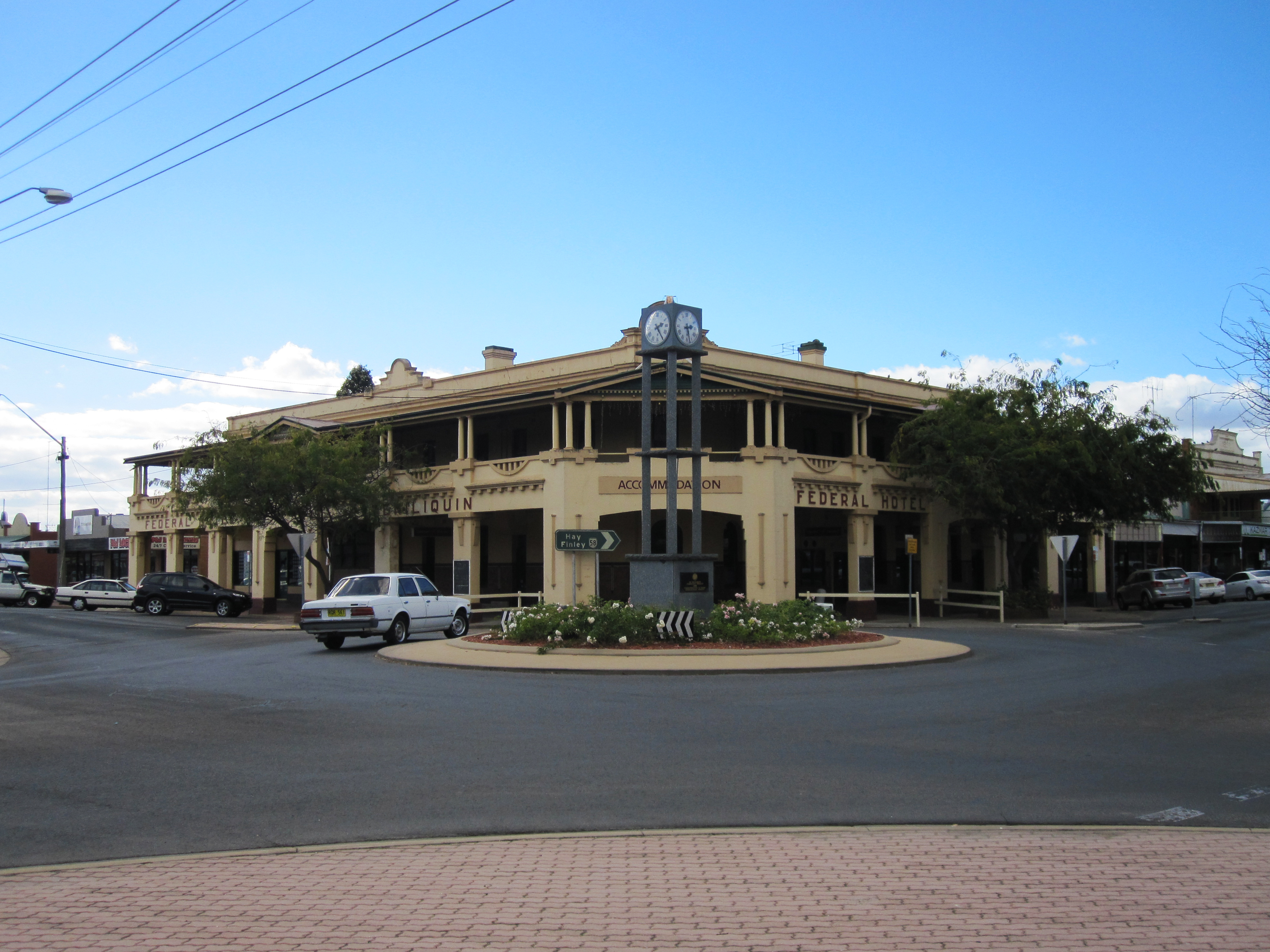
The Federal Hotel in Deniliquin

Deniliquin is a service centre for the surrounding agricultural region. The region includes both dryland and irrigated areas. The dryland areas support grazing, in particular beef cattle and wool growing. Deniliquin is home to many famous Merino studs and the saltbush plains produce quality medium class wool.

The irrigated areas produce a range of high-yield crops. Rice was a major crop until the recent drought. The largest rice mill in the southern hemisphere is in Deniliquin, producing large packs and bulk rice for export markets. The rice mill closed in December 2007 and will reopen in April 2011.

Deniliquin is also the headquarters of Murray Irrigation Limited, an irrigator owned private company and one of the largest privately owned irrigation supply companies in the world. Murray Irrigation manages the operations of the Berriquin, Deniboota, Denimein and Wakool Irrigation Areas in the Murray Valley. These areas produce 50% of Australia's rice crop, 20% of New South Wales's milk production, 75% of New South Wales's processing tomatoes and 40% of New South Wales's potatoes.

Sawmills in the area process timber harvested from the River red gum forests lining the Edward and Murray floodplains.

As the largest town in the south western Riverina, there is a range of government and commercial services to residents of the town and the surrounding area.

== Climate ==
Deniliquin has a cold semi-arid (BSk) climate with hot, sunny summers and cool, mostly cloudy winters. The town's highest temperature of 49.6 °C (121.3 °F) was reached on 12 January 1878, and is one of the highest ever recorded in Australia as well as being the southernmost 50 °C reading (if rounded up).

Despite the stretches of extreme heat, Deniliquin is prone to cold fronts in the summer due to its south-western location, making for an extreme variation at times. In contrast, the lowest daytime maximum in summer was 11.7 °C (53.1 °F) on 2 February 2005 at the new airport site. This reading was substantially colder than the previous February low maximum of 15.1 °C (59.2 °F) set in 1951, and colder than even the March low maximum of 12.1 °C (53.8 °F).

Climate data for Deniliquin Visitor Information Centre (1858–2003, rainfall to 2022); 96 m AMSL; 35.53° S, 144.97° E
Month	Jan	Feb	Mar	Apr	May	Jun	Jul	Aug	Sep	Oct	Nov	Dec	Year
Record high °C (°F)	49.6 (121.3)	47.2 (117.0)	45.0 (113.0)	41.7 (107.1)	31.1 (88.0)	25.6 (78.1)	25.9 (78.6)	29.8 (85.6)	35.0 (95.0)	40.8 (105.4)	44.2 (111.6)	47.8 (118.0)	49.6 (121.3)
Mean daily maximum °C (°F)	32.5 (90.5)	32.0 (89.6)	28.7 (83.7)	23.5 (74.3)	18.6 (65.5)	15.1 (59.2)	14.4 (57.9)	16.4 (61.5)	19.7 (67.5)	23.6 (74.5)	27.5 (81.5)	30.6 (87.1)	23.6 (74.4)
Mean daily minimum °C (°F)	15.7 (60.3)	15.7 (60.3)	13.3 (55.9)	9.5 (49.1)	6.5 (43.7)	4.5 (40.1)	3.4 (38.1)	4.4 (39.9)	6.2 (43.2)	8.8 (47.8)	11.7 (53.1)	14.1 (57.4)	9.5 (49.1)
Record low °C (°F)	4.4 (39.9)	4.5 (40.1)	0.6 (33.1)	0.0 (32.0)	−3.9 (25.0)	−5.6 (21.9)	−6.1 (21.0)	−6.1 (21.0)	−3.3 (26.1)	−1.7 (28.9)	0.6 (33.1)	2.2 (36.0)	−6.1 (21.0)
Average precipitation mm (inches)	28.2 (1.11)	28.2 (1.11)	32.1 (1.26)	30.2 (1.19)	38.0 (1.50)	39.8 (1.57)	34.9 (1.37)	36.7 (1.44)	37.7 (1.48)	39.3 (1.55)	29.9 (1.18)	29.7 (1.17)	405.7 (15.97)
Average precipitation days (≥ 0.2 mm)	3.8	3.6	4.1	5.1	7.4	9.1	9.6	9.5	8.4	7.4	5.3	4.6	77.9
Average afternoon relative humidity (%)	30	33	37	44	56	63	62	55	48	40	34	31	44

== Notable people ==
Notable people from, or who have lived in, the Deniliquin area include:

- Adam Alexander Armstrong MC, OBE, former Member for Riverina, official Victoria Racing Club starter (21 Melbourne Cups), Military Cross awarded WW 2 for bravery in New Guinea
- Leo Barry, an Australian rules football player with Sydney Swans
- Hazel de Berg MBE, oral historian, was born here in 1913.
- Eileen Mary Casey (1881–1972), suffragette
- Michael Cavanagh, drummer for Australian psychedelic rock band King Gizzard and The Lizard Wizard
- Aileen Dent (1890–1978), artist
- Ian Egerton, Australian rules footballer
- Malcolm Fraser, a former Liberal Prime Minister
- Adam Gilchrist, test and one day cricket wicket keeper and sports commentator
- Roy Higgins, Melbourne Cup winning jockey
- Bob Henderson, Australian rules footballer
- Patrick Jennings, a former Premier of New South Wales
- Sam Lloyd, an Australian rules football player with Richmond Tigers
- Todd Marshall, an Australian rules football player with Port Adelaide Power
- Peter McIntyre, an Australian rules football player with Adelaide Crows
- Eric Moore, former drummer and manager for Australian psychedelic rock band King Gizzard and The Lizard Wizard
- Lee Naimo, Axis of Awesome guitarist
- Simon O'Donnell, test and one day cricket player, Australian rules football player and media personality
- Taimus Werner-Gibbings, member of the Australian Capital Territory Legislative Assembly

== Education ==
Deniliquin has three public primary schools (Deniliquin South, Deniliquin North and Edward), one Catholic primary school (St Michael's Primary School) and one public high school (Deniliquin High School), which was partly damaged in late 2025 due to an arson attack by two teenage boys who attended the school.

It has a TAFE NSW Campus, which is part of the Riverina Institute of TAFE.

Deniliquin is also the base for the NSW Department of Education South West Riverina regional office. South West Music Regional Conservatorium, part of a network of regional Conservatoriums in NSW, also offers a range of music tuition.

== Sport ==
Sporting clubs in the area include:

- Australian rules football
  - Deniliquin Rams Football Club, have competed in the Murray Football League since 1933.
  - Deniliquin Rovers Football Club competing in the Picola & District Football League.

The Deniliquin Football Association ran from 1900 to 1932.

- Rugby union
  - Deniliquin Drovers, competing in Southern Inland Rugby Union.
- Rugby league
  - Deniliquin Blueheelers rejoined Group 17 Rugby League in 2025 for the first time since 1977.
- Cricket
  - Deniliquin Rhinos Cricket Team, competing in the Murray Valley Cricket Association
- Soccer
  - Deniliquin Wanderers Soccer Club – formed in the 1960s. Currently playing in the Bendigo amateur soccer league.

The Deniliquin Blue Heelers previously competed in Group 17 Rugby League from the early 1960s until 1977. They won three premierships in a row in 1969, 1970 and 1971.The club has relaunched for season 2025

== Deni Play on the Plains Festival ==
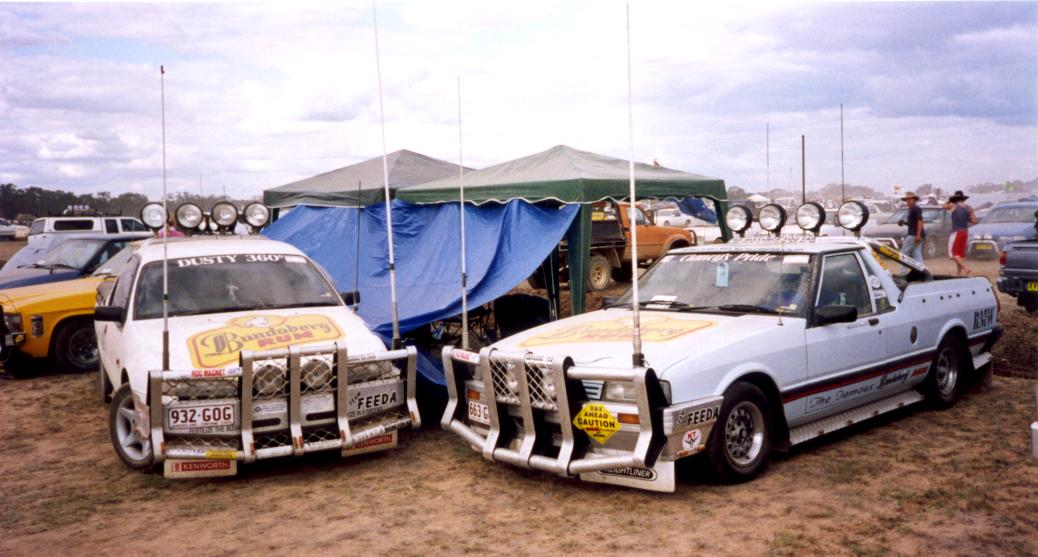
Two Utes at the Deni Ute muster 2002

Deniliquin is home to the Play on the Plains Festival, held each September/October on the New South Wales Labour Day long weekend. The festival includes the well-known Deniliquin Ute Muster. The Deni Play on the Plains Festival has set a number of world records, including the following:

Year	Number of utes in one location	Number of people wearing blue singlets
1999	2839	
2000	2990	
2001	3012	
2002	3070	
2003	3418	
2004	4012	1328
2005	6172	1474
2006	6211	1566
2007	6235	1587
2008	7242	2702
2009	7000	2230
2010	10,152	3500

== Music ==
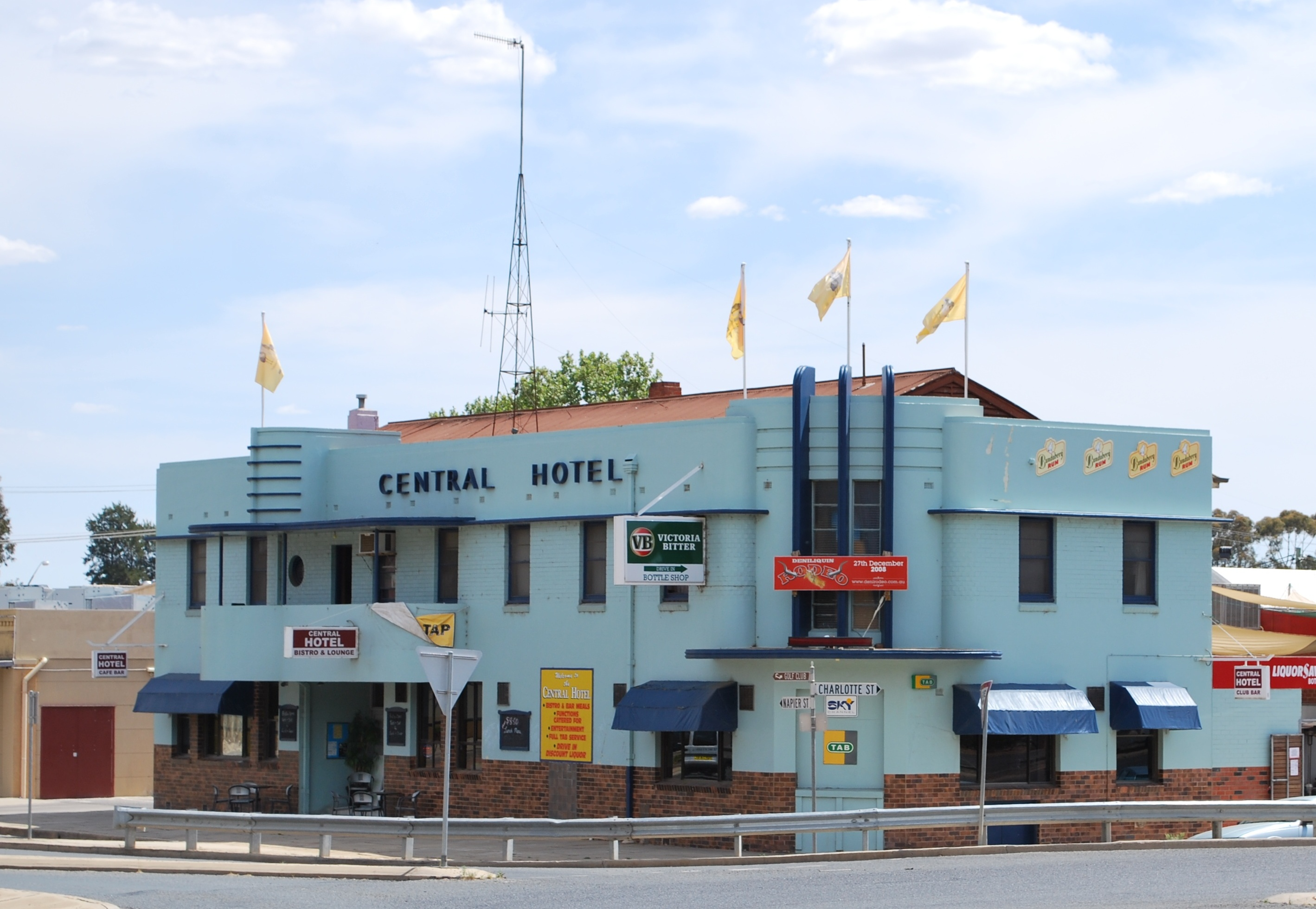
Central Hotel

Deniliquin has had many local bands, some notable ones being the Lincolns, the Stormtroopers and the Lexies. Attempts been made to encourage other bands to come to Deniliquin to perform, with varying success. Solo performers who came from Deniliquin include Shane McGrath, Michael Gorham and Joel Sulman, with local artists often showcased at the Deniliquin Ute Muster.

=== Music festivals ===
Deniliquin has been home to many music festivals. These include:

- Deniliquin Blues and Roots Festival: Held over the Easter long weekend and has bought acts such as Status Quo, Santana, Jason Mraz (2013) and held in 2014 John Mayer, Elvis Costello, local artist Michael Gorham and previous local blues artist Joel Sulman. It won Best Inland Festival in 2013.
- The Flat Earth Festival, organised by a youth committee under the auspices of South West Music, beginning in 1999 and running until 2003. The aim of the Flat Earth Festival (so named because Deniliquin is on the Hay Plains, the area with the smallest deviation of elevation on Earth) was to provide a music festival accompanied by other activities (such as motocross demonstrations) in a drug- and alcohol-free environment. The Flat Earth Festival youth committee failed to attract new members as previous members moved on, and the event recessed. Bands attending the Flat Earth Festival included Grinspoon and Sunk Loto.
- Shakedown Festival, which involves live bands and DJs. It is organised by the Deniliquin Youth Council, a sub-committee of the Deniliquin Municipal Council, and is held during National Youth Week, on 14 April. Notable acts appearing at Shakedown include Dukes of Windsor, Behind Crimson Eyes and Andy Van.
- Spring Blues Festival, inaugurated in 2006. The aim of the festival is to expose Deniliquin residents to talented blues musicians performing in Australia, as well as providing music workshops and impromptu jam sessions. Notable acts appearing at The Spring Blues Festival have included Dutch Tilders and Jeff Lang.

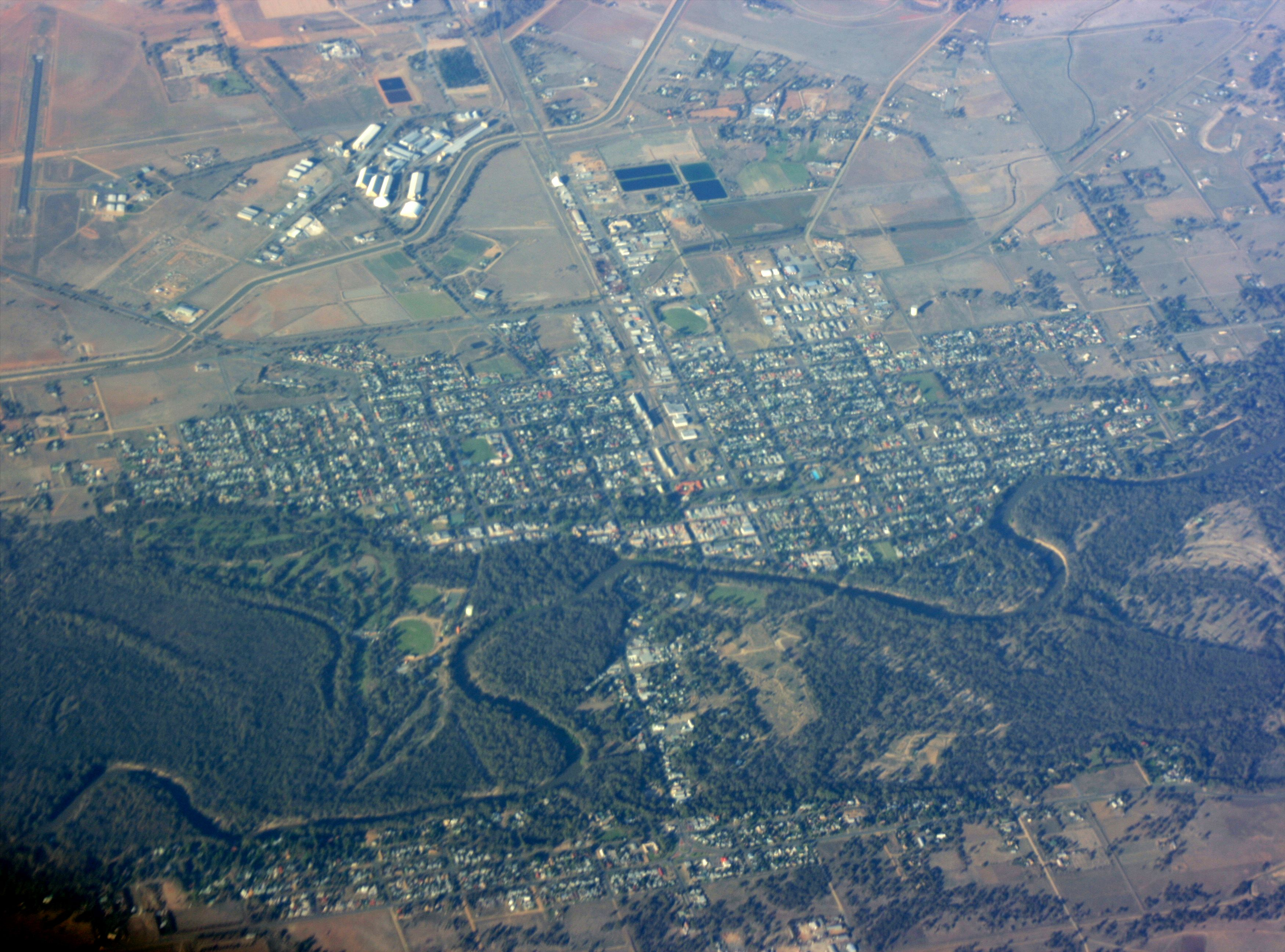
Aerial picture of the town

== Media ==
The local newspaper is the Deniliquin Pastoral Times. It is published on Tuesdays and Fridays and – on each of these days – has a circulation of 2787, with an estimated readership of 10,260. Other newspapers circulated throughout the Deniliquin region include the Herald Sun, The Age, The Sydney Morning Herald and The Daily Telegraph.

There are two local commercial radio stations: 102.5 Edge FM (Music that makes you feel good), 1521 2QN (News, Talk and only the hits you love) and also broadcast on 106.1FM, while ABC Local Radio's ABC Riverina service (broadcast from Wagga Wagga) is available on AM675.

Other stations broadcasting throughout the region include Radio National, SBS Radio and Sky Sports Radio.

Locally available TV stations include ABC Television (ABC TV, ABC Family, ABC Entertains and ABC News), SBS Television (SBS TV, SBS Viceland, SBS Food, NITV, SBS WorldWatch and SBS World Movies), Seven (7HD, 7two, 7mate, 7flix, 7Bravo, TVSN and Racing.com), WIN Television (WIN HD, 9Go!, 9Gem, 9Life and Gold) and Network 10 (10 HD, 10 Comedy, 10 Drama, Nickelodeon, SBN and News24 Regional). WIN Television produces a half-hour-long regional news bulletin which screens from Monday to Friday at 6pm.

The thriller The Clinic was filmed in Deniliquin in 2008. The producers used many locations in the town while shooting, including the Peppin Motor Inn, Warbreccan Homestead, Deniliquin abattoirs and the largest rice mill in the Southern Hemisphere.
