= DRFC (disambiguation) =

Doncaster Rovers F.C. (DRFC) are an English association football club

DRFC may also refer to:

In association football:

- Dagenham & Redbridge F.C.
- Deeping Rangers F.C.
- Dungannon Rovers F.C.
- Dunmurry Recreation F.C.

In rugby union:

- Darlington RFC
- Dartmouth Rugby Football Club
- Derby RFC
- Doncaster R.F.C.
- Dorchester Rugby Football Club
- Dunstablians R.F.C.

In Australian rules football:

- Deniliquin Rovers Football Club
