= Waring Gardens =

Coordinates: 35°31′49″S 144°57′46″E

Waring Gardens, Bandstand and Pavilion
- Location: Cressy Street, Deniliquin, Edward River Council, New South Wales, Australia

History
- Built: 1880–1888

Site notes
- Architect: John Waring

New South Wales Heritage Database (Local Government Register)
- Official name: Waring Gardens, Bandstand and Pavilion / Deniliquin Local Environmental Plan 2013; Cressy St Garden's;
- Type: Local Environmental Plan
- Designated: 23 December 2013
- Reference no.: 1500017
- Site type: Other – Parks, Gardens & Trees
- Category: Parks, Gardens and Trees
- Builders: Deniliquin Council

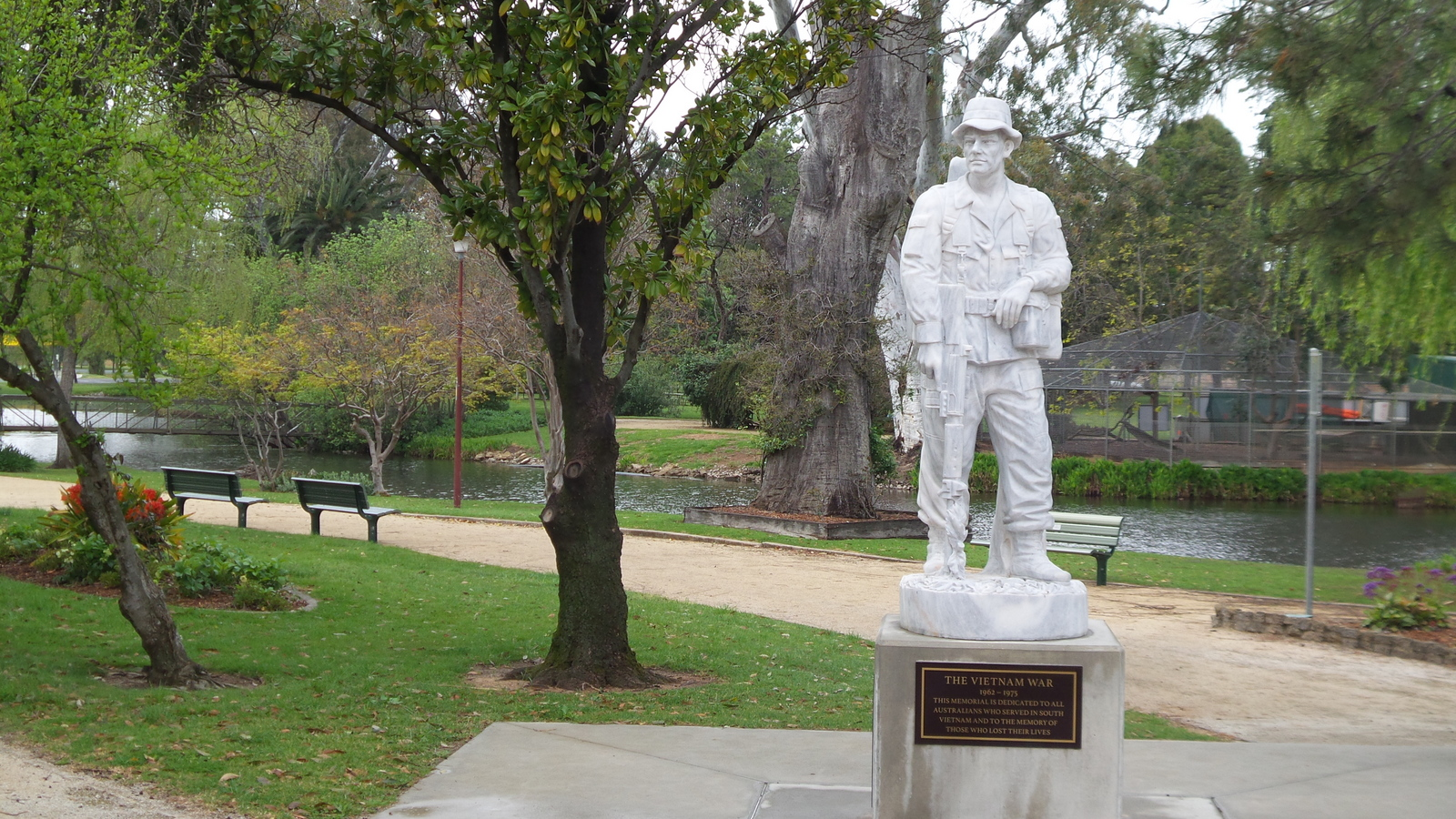
Vietnam memorial

Waring Gardens, Bandstand and Pavilion is a heritage-listed park at Cressy Street, Deniliquin, Edward River Council, New South Wales, Australia. It was designed by John Waring, the first Town Clerk of Deniliquin, and built from 1880 to 1888 by staff of the Deniliquin Council. It is also known as Cressy St Gardens.

== History ==
When John Waring arrived in Deniliquin in 1855, the lagoon was a dirty water hole being blamed for sickness and death in the community.

In 1869 when he held the position of Town Clerk he advised the council to turn the lagoon into a garden. In 1880 the Council cleared the area and planted willows, continuing to plant various shrubs and trees in the following years. The gardens were set up as a Botanic Garden to experiment and see what would grow in the area. The gardens also contained a large aviary.

In 1885 a curator of the gardens was appointed. Waring died that same year and in 1888 a ceremony was performed to officially open the gardens, and an obelisk erected in Waring's honour.

Improvements continued. A band pavilion were built in 1913 and was in use for many years until a fire in 1960 almost destroyed it. In 1961 the deck was lowered from the original height of 7 feet from the ground down to 3 feet as "people complained the music was going over their heads". Local builder Brian Smith was contracted to do the alterations.

The Soldiers Memorial was unveiled in 1922.

When the School of Arts was demolished in 1974, the three statues (The Muses) were placed in the gardens (these have subsequently been relocated to the corner of Edwardes and Cressy Street at the Multi Arts Centre complex).

The Boer War Memorial, originally erected in 1902 at the intersection of Cressy and Edwardes Streets, was relocated to a position in the Waring Gardens, then shifted back to its original site at the intersection in 2001.

The fence surrounding the Waring Gardens was originally a white picket fence. This was replaced by a woven wire fence, and then by a low brick fence. The cannon/ gun was removed from the garden in 2004 to be refurbished by the Deniliquin RSL sub branch.

== Description ==
Important fixtures are still located in the gardens, such as the obelisk honouring John Waring, a small pavilion, band rotunda, fountain, and the War Memorial Gates at the north west corner of the gardens. The old footbridge has been replaced with one of modern materials. Children's play equipment has been introduced, as have modern seats. The Cressy Street boundary is defined by a low brick wall.

The proclamation plaque is located in the Gardens.

== Significance ==
The Waring Gardens has been assessed as worthy of heritage status according to the following criteria.

The place is important in demonstrating the course, or pattern, of cultural or natural history in New South Wales.

The Waring Gardens are significant for their past and present use as a passive recreation area adjacent to Cressy Street, the main street of Deniliquin, the location of significant memorials and the efforts of Town Clerk, Mr. John Waring to have the area developed. It is shaded by exotic and native trees and shrubs. The gardens are an essential part of the town and used and appreciated by townspeople and visitors each day.

The place has a strong or special association with a person, or group of persons, of importance of cultural or natural history of New South Wales's history.

The gardens are named after Mr John Waring, former Deniliquiun town clerk, who was instrumental in the establishment of the garden and retention of the lagoon system through the town.

The place is important in demonstrating aesthetic characteristics and/or a high degree of creative or technical achievement in New South Wales.

The gardens provide the focal point for the heritage conservation area of the town. Located adjacent to the CBD, it provides picturesque vistas though the CBD and is the crowning feature of the urban area in south Deniliquin.

The place is ihas strong or special association with a particular community or cultural group in New South Wales for social, cultural or spiritual reasons.

The garden house many monuments and structures which enable the visitor to identify the people, events and social occasions which have helped to shape Deniliquin. Within or adjacent to the gardens are the Cenotaph, St Pauls church and Sunday school, the three muses, the CWA rooms all of which are considered as being individual items in their own right.

The place has potential to yield information that will contribute to an understanding of the cultural or natural history of New South Wales.

The gardens house many monuments and structure which could be used to define the activities, events and people that were important in shaping Deniliquin.

The place possesses uncommon, rare or endangered aspects of the cultural or natural history of New South Wales.

The gardens are a rare feature in the town, due to the lagoon, the close proximity to the CBD and the structure and form of the gardens within the town's heritage conservation area.

The place is important in demonstrating the principal characteristics of a class of cultural or natural places/environments in New South Wales.

The gardens represent a historical and period gardens which is important in understand how Deniliquin has evolved since the gardens where commenced in 1880
