= St Andrew's Uniting Church, Deniliquin =

St Andrew's Uniting Church
- Deniliquin Uniting Church
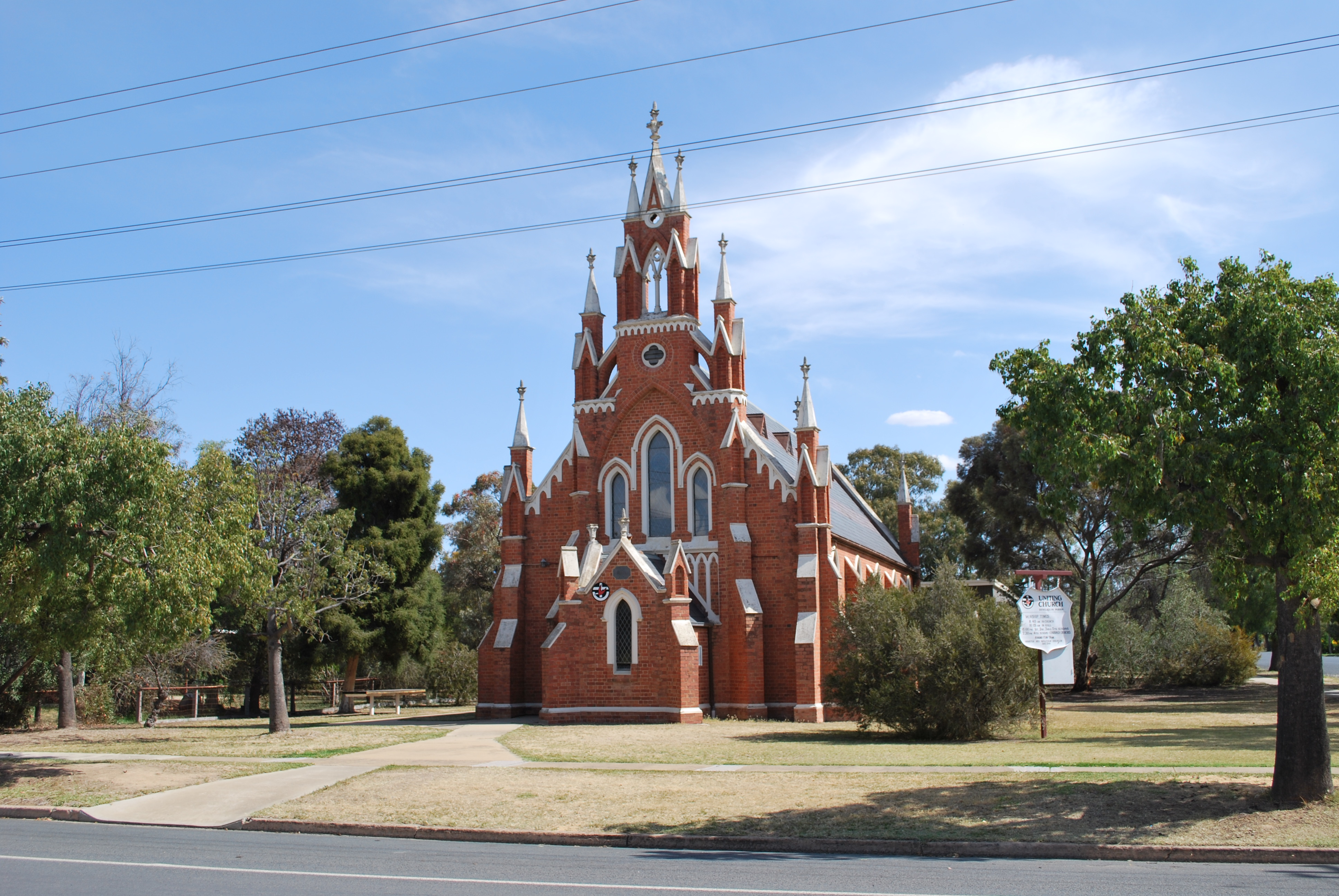
- St Andrew's Uniting Church, pictured in 2008

- Location in New South Wales
- 35°31′56″S 144°57′43″E
- Location: Poictiers Street, Deniliquin, Edward River Council, New South Wales
- Country: Australia
- Denomination: Uniting
- Previous denomination: Presbyterian
- Website: riverina.unitingchurch.org.au/congregations/deniliquin-multi-centred-congregation/

History
- Former name: St Andrew's Presbyterian Church
- Status: Church
- Dedication: Saint Andrew

Architecture
- Functional status: Active
- Architectural type: Church
- Style: Victorian Free Gothic
- Years built: 1876–1877

Specifications
- Materials: Red brick; Slate roof

New South Wales Heritage Register
- Official name: St. Andrew's Uniting Church; St Andrew's; St Andrews
- Type: State heritage (complex / group)
- Designated: 2 April 1999
- Reference no.: 372
- Type: Church
- Category: Religion

St Andrew's Uniting Church is a heritage-listed Uniting church at Poictiers Street, Deniliquin, Edward River Council, New South Wales, Australia. It was built from 1876 to 1877. It is also known as the Deniliquin Uniting Church. The property is owned by the Uniting Church in Australia. It was added to the New South Wales State Heritage Register on 2 April 1999.

== History ==
St Andrew's Uniting Church was constructed as the St Andrew's Presbyterian Church in 1876–77 and opened on 2 December 1877. Sabbath Hall was constructed in 1896.

Following the unification of the Presbyterian, Methodist and Congregationalist Churches, the Uniting Church decided to retain the St Andrew's site and sell the Methodist Church on the opposite corner to the Salvation Army.

=== Conservation ===
One option considered by the church as part of the consolidation of its properties was the demolition of the existing St Andrew's Church and Hall. A member of the congregation requested protection of the buildings. Due to its uncertain future a Section 130 order was made over the Church and Hall on 25 March 1983. On 8 April 1983 the Uniting Church gave notice of its intention to demolish the Church and parts of the Hall. Subsequently, an Interim Heritage Order was placed over the site on 27 May 1983. On 13 July 1983 members of the Heritage Council during a tour of the region met with the Minister and Parish Council to discuss the matter. However, no immediate solution was reached.

The Heritage Council considered the matter at its meeting of 27 November 1984. Views of the Uniting Church Board of Finance and Property were sought who advised that a change in the shift of attitudes could occur. It was considered that alternate design solutions on the site may be possible that allowed additional buildings whilst retaining the Church and Hall. As a result, another Interim Heritage Order was made. A report by Hardcastle and Richards P/L Structural Engineers made it clear that due to structural problems it would be not feasible to retain the Sabbath Hall building.

On 19 June 1984 a small dilapidated addition to Sabbath Hall was approved for demolition. At its meeting of 10 November 1986 the Heritage Council recommended that it was not possible to keep Sabbath Hall and that in the light of the withdrawal of Parish objections to proceed with the making of a permanent Conservation Order. This was gazetted on 13 February 1987. In 1989 a small grant of up to $2,000 was made to the Parish on a $ for $ basis for conservation works and advice to the Church, with the works completed in the same year. Sabbath Hall was demolished in 1990.

== Description ==
St Andrew's Uniting Church is a finely detailed building constructed of the red brick characteristic of the Deniliquin area. Designed in the Victorian Free Gothic style, the Church is flanked by a series of buttresses and a tower dominates its front elevation. The steep pitch of the slate roof is reflected in the multitude of pinnacles which combine with small flying buttresses and some Romanesque elements to decorate the tower. This theme is repeated in the entrance porch centrally located at the front of the Church.

St Andrew's Sabbath Hall (now demolished) was also constructed of Deniliquin brick, is rectangular in form with a pitched roof of corrugated iron. Its principle facade contained several elements of Greek revival architecture. Of symmetrical design, its windows and doors had lintels with classical consoles. Pilasters in the form of columns supported an entablature with a decorative pediment.

== Heritage listing ==
St Andrew's Uniting Church is centrally located on a prominent site within the urban area of Deniliquin. The Church was constructed in 1876–77, is designed in the Free Gothic Style, is carefully designed and built and has a quite powerful presence considering its size and the nature of the site. The building is of historical and architectural significance to Deniliquin and the surrounding region. It is in relatively original intact condition. The Church is regarded as one of the finest buildings in Deniliquin and is of particular architectural merit.

St Andrew's Uniting Church was listed on the New South Wales State Heritage Register on 2 April 1999.

== See also ==
- List of Uniting churches in New South Wales
