= Deniliquin 75mm Field Gun =

- Location within New South Wales Location within Australia
- 35°32′08″S 144°58′03″E
- Location: 72 End Street, Deniliquin, Edward River Council, New South Wales, Australia

History
- Built: 1904–1904

Site notes
- Architect: Friedrich Krupp AG
- Owner: Deniliquin RSL Club Ltd

New South Wales Heritage Register
- Official name: 75mm Field Gun (moveable heritage item); 7.5 cm Field Gun Model 1904
- Type: State heritage (movable / collection)
- Designated: 6 March 2015
- Reference no.: 1948
- Type: Defence Objects (movable)
- Category: Defence
- Builders: Friedrich Krupp AG

Deniliquin 75mm Field Gun is a heritage-listed artillery piece and war trophy located in Deniliquin, in the Riverina region of New South Wales, Australia. It was designed and built during 1904 by Friedrich Krupp AG and captured by Australian forces during the Battle of Beersheba in 1917. Now on display at the Deniliquin RSL Club, the gun was added to the New South Wales State Heritage Register on 6 March 2015. Heritage documents also refer to it as 75mm Field Gun (moveable heritage item) and 7.5 cm Field Gun Model 1904.

== History ==
The efforts and sacrifices of the Australian armed forces in World War I were significant in the history of the country. Proportionally, Australia suffered the most casualties of any British army and only one fallen soldier, Major General William Throsby Bridges, was ever returned to Australia for burial. With the war heroes laid to rest on foreign soils, local war memorials became a popular method through which the Australian community could commemorate those lost. Per head of population, Australia had more World War I memorials than any other country in the world and they quickly became a potent symbol of the significant contributions and sacrifices made by the entirely volunteer Australian armed forces.

Following the conclusion of the Great War, there was a surge of public interest in obtaining war trophies captured by the Australian forces to display alongside the memorials. Artillery had emerged as a dominant force in the war and war trophies (particularly guns) became a powerful symbol to the Australian people of a conflict fought so far away from the community that was so affected by its events.

At the time, the role of the volunteer armed forces in the First World War played a significant part in the shaping of the Australian national identity. To celebrate and provide tangible evidence of these efforts, Australia was eager to obtain these war trophies from the British Empire. Britain had an extensive military history but to Australia, having only recently achieved independence, these trophies were important as a form of national recognition and compensation for the great sacrifices made by its people.

As well as a powerful form of commemoration, war trophies were also a recognisable source of national pride (and even propaganda) in the community. The public display of trophies continued a long-held British tradition of disarming the enemy and parading the spoils of the conflict (the war booty) in the victorious country. Trophies were physical proof of victory and defeat of the enemy in battle. The displayed weapons also had a valuable effect in instilling a military spirit into the boys thereby ensuring nationalistic sentiment in the community to stimulate recruitment for possible future conflicts.

After the weapons (captured during the Great War) had been shipped back to Britain, the Australian Government was alerted to the fact that the British National War Museum (now the Imperial Museum) was intending to retain the trophies. Australia's Prime Minister, Billy Hughes, wrote to the Governor-General requesting the weapons captured by Australian forces be returned to Australia as a relic of their efforts overseas.

This request was ultimately granted and the Australian War Records Office took on the responsibility for the collection and classification of trophies captured by Australian units. By 1919, however, each state had established a trophy committee to determine the distribution of this collection. The NSW State War Committee had four members: Sen. A. Gardiner (Senate representative), WH Ifould Esq. (Government representative), WH Fleming Esq (Opposition representative) and Colonel J. Lamrock (AIF representative).

It had been decided that large trophies (artillery weapons, machine guns and mortars) were highly suitable for distribution by these committees. Being strong and well-built, they could withstand the natural elements and be displayed easily in community parks (parks having been previously determined as the most prominent and easily accessible locations for display).

After a small selection of trophies were chosen for display at the Australian War Museum (now the Australian War Memorial in Canberra) and a number of weapons distributed to Army units in recognition of their association with AIF units, the remaining weapons were divided between the states and distributed by the trophy committees in accordance with a number of guidelines developed to ensure a fair national distribution of trophies to communities.

The guidelines for distribution were to be based on the size and population of Australian towns and the process of allocation was to involve a series of three distributions. The first round involved the allocation of weapons to those AIF units responsible for the original capture (many of whom re-allocated these trophies to Council or towns as they saw fit). The second round saw trophies distributed to towns Australia-wide that would accept the weapons in accordance with certain conditions: that three trustees (including an AIF representative) be appointed to act on behalf of the town regarding the trophy and that these trustees sign a written agreement assenting that: the trophy would be permanently housed in a publicly accessible location; a simple but appropriate ceremony would be arranged for the formal hand over of the trophy; and that the town would bear all expenses in the movement and housing of the trophy upon its arrival at the nearest train station. The trophies allocated to towns unable or unwilling to meet these conditions were then re-distributed in a third and final allocation.

The 75mm field gun at Deniliquin, presented to the community by the Trophy Committee in 1921, is a significant weapon because it was allegedly captured during the last great cavalry charge in history - an iconic battle which saw the Australian 4th Light Horse Brigade capture Beersheba from the Turkish forces in 1917. This quick-fire field gun was designed and manufactured for Romania by the famous Krupp arms company in 1904. The Krupp company was a major designer and international trader of arms for much of the nineteenth century and it rose to success under Albert Krupp who established and excelled at the design and manufacture of cast steel cannons. Later, under the leadership of his son Friedrich, the Krupp company underwent a revival with the refinement of their production of cast steel. Production of cast steel had previously been an experimental and highly dangerous practice but Krupp's refinement of its production was regarded as a major metallurgical achievement for the day, thus seeing Krupp weapons reach the pinnacle of the international artillery business.

In the decade preceding World War I, many Eastern European countries underwent major rearmament for their military, thereby utilising the new technology that was transforming the artillery business at the time. In an effort to modernise, King Carol I of Romania sought his new artillery from the Krupp company and had his crest inscribed on the weapons (still evident on the barrel of Deniliquin's 75mm field gun).

Romania was initially a neutral power when war broke out but eventually sided with the British and allied forces in 1916. After being invaded by the German forces, the Romanian weapons (now German trophies) were distributed amongst their allies (resulting in the 75mm field gun going to the Turkish forces in the Middle East). However, through the Sinai and Palestine campaign, this gun was soon to become an Australian war trophy.

In 1917, the Desert Mounted Corps was advancing across the peninsula to combat the Turkish forces. This action was to be a turning point in the war and, with the emergence of artillery dictating the warfare, this campaign proved to be the last in which a horse-mounted infantry would play such a defining role. The battle of Beersheba was to become famous as the final great cavalry charge in history (not technically the last in history but the last great charge for what was attempted and ultimately achieved).

Beersheba was a strategic stronghold for the Turks and, being the final line of defence, victory by the allied forces would significantly threaten and weaken the enemy's capabilities to defend against a takeover. This type of desert warfare was largely dictated by the need for water supplies (for both troops and horses) and Beersheba had artificial and natural wells that were believed to be plentiful. Capture of these water supplies was critical to the allied advancement and, after travelling some 30 miles through the desert (and 36 hours without water), the swift attack and capture of Beersheba was essential. Failure to capture the town would have forced the army to retreat, giving the Turks an opportunity to re-establish and replenish their defences and thus, handing victory to the enemy.

On 31 October 1917, with the opportunity for victory fading with the daylight, the 4th Light Horse Brigade, led by Lieutenant General Sir Harry Chauvel, staged a dangerous and unlikely (but ultimately creative) attack that "on paper, at least...seemed doomed to failure". Under the command of Brigadier General Grant, the 4th Light Horse were ordered to attack and take the town by dusk. Although significantly outnumbered by the Turkish soldiers, the men and horses of the 4th Light Horse Brigade galloped bravely across 6 km of unprotected ground, through open enemy fire, before dismounting and fighting in hand-to-hand combat in the trenches.

This swift attack caught the Turkish by surprise and, although there were 31 Australian casualties, the charge was largely successful because the Turkish could not reload their weapons fast enough to defend against the oncoming mounted infantry. The speed of the attack also prevented the enemy forces from destroying the valuable water wells. The spoils of the charge were over one thousand prisoners, nine guns (the Deniliquin 75mm field gun included) and numerous machine guns and automatic rifles. Following the unlikely but now famous success at Beersheba (a "victory by Australians led by Australians", the Allied forces now focussed their efforts on the major target of Gaza (a charge that ultimately led to Turkish surrender in Damascus in 1918 and the end of the Great War).

Although the battle of Beersheba is now an iconic story in Australia's military history, the presence and symbolism of war trophies in Australia has changed considerably since the First World War. Post-war, the condition of many of the trophies began to deteriorate as they were exposed to the natural elements for longer periods of time. Personal injury and costly maintenance resulted in a shift of public sentiment for these First World War trophies and, as the outbreak of World War II loomed, these trophies were relegated out of the domestic interest and into history. Fading symbolism undermined the significance of the trophies and, as such, a large number were lost to degradation and neglect. A more recent resurgence of interest, however, has seen a growing public interest in the restoration and preservation of Australia's World War I trophies. The spoils of the First World War are now shifting from memory to history and are becoming, more and more, a recognisable part of Australia's collective heritage.

== Description ==
The 75mm Field Gun at Deniliquin is a copy of the German 7.7 cm Field Gun 96. This gun was manufactured for Romania in 1904 and has the cypher of the reigning monarch of Romania, King Carol I.

After sympathetic conservation works in 2008/09, including the construction of new wheels (built to the specifications of the originals) and the restoration of the metal work, the gun is in good condition.

=== Condition ===
As at 22 July 2009, after sympathetic conservation works in 2008/09, including the construction of new wheels (built to the specifications of the originals) and the restoration of the metal work, the gun is in good condition.

The weapon has undergone significant, although sympathetic, conservation work in 2008/09. The work included the construction of new timber wheels (built to the specifications of the originals) and restoration to the metal work. Before commencing the restoration work, advice was obtained from the Royal Australian Artillery Historical Company, the Army Museum Bandianna and the Australian War Memorial.

=== Modifications and dates ===
After some 80 years of display in a public park and long-term exposure to the weather, this gun had fallen into a state of disrepair. The original timber work had deteriorated beyond repair but the metal work remained in good condition. The gun was restored to its original state in 2008/09 with the construction of new wheels (to the exact specifications of the originals) and the restoration of the metal work (undertaken by local businesses and volunteers). Before commencing the work, advice was obtained from the Royal Australian Artillery Historical Company, the Army Museum Bandianna and the Australian War Memorial.

== Heritage listing ==
As at 27 August 2014, the 75mm field gun at Deniliquin has state heritage significance as a rare example of its type in NSW, being one of only three of its kind in the state. This war trophy is significant for its purported association with the Australian 4th Light Horse Brigade and the famous cavalry charge on Beersheba in 1917 (an iconic attack that led to the surrender of the Turkish forces and the end to the Great War). Following the war, trophy guns became a potent symbol of the pride, gratitude and mourning felt by the community for the sacrifices made by the Australian armed forces and, as well as a tangible reminder of the military victory at Beersheba, the 75mm field gun trophy has served as a public memorial to the courageous efforts of the fallen Australian soldiers since its public installation in Deniliquin in 1921.

75mm Field Gun was listed on the New South Wales State Heritage Register on 6 March 2015 having satisfied the following criteria.

The place is important in demonstrating the course, or pattern, of cultural or natural history in New South Wales.

The 75mm field gun at Deniliquin has state heritage significance as a war trophy purportedly captured by the Australian 4th Light Horse Brigade at the iconic battle of Beersheba in World War I. With the war fought so far from Australian shores and with the fallen heroes buried abroad, memorials and war trophies were important to the community as a potent symbol of commemoration for the efforts and sacrifices of the Australian armed forces.

The place has a strong or special association with a person, or group of persons, of importance of cultural or natural history of New South Wales's history.

The 75mm field gun at Deniliquin has state heritage significance for its purported association with the 4th Light Horse Brigade. The Brigade's brave charge in the Battle of Beersheba was significant in the First World War and the efforts and sacrifices made by these Australian servicemen are associated with this war trophy.

It is also significant for its association with the communities left in Australia to commemorate the fallen heroes. Local war memorials and trophies were important to the mourning community as tangible evidence of the Great War and as powerful symbols of the efforts and sacrifices of the Australian armed forces serving overseas.

The place is important in demonstrating aesthetic characteristics and/or a high degree of creative or technical achievement in New South Wales.

The 75mm field gun at Deniliquin has local heritage significance for its aesthetic values. After some 80 years of display in a public park, and its continuous exposure to the elements, the gun had fallen into a state of disrepair. The subsequent conservation work has restored the trophy to is original state and improved its aesthetic value.

This gun also demonstrates the technical achievements in artillery design from the First World War. Designed and manufactured by the Krupp company (a leader in international artillery trading), this weapon is a fine example of the advanced quick-fire technology being used at the time of the First World War.

The place has a strong or special association with a particular community or cultural group in New South Wales for social, cultural or spiritual reasons.

The 75mm field gun at Deniliquin has local heritage significance for its social value to the community. Presented to Deniliquin in 1921, the weapon was prominently displayed for some 80 years in the public park. Being accessible to the community, the trophy became a place of mourning and commemoration for the efforts and sacrifices made by the Australian armed forces in World War I. For a small rural community like Deniliquin, this weapon was also a physical reminder of a war being fought on foreign soils by their own local men and women.

The place has potential to yield information that will contribute to an understanding of the cultural or natural history of New South Wales.

The 75mm field gun at Deniliquin has state heritage significance for its potential to reveal further information about the design and manufacture of a German gun for use by the Romanian military. Being one of only three of its type in NSW, this example of a European weapon built and traded by the famous Krupp company also grants an opportunity to explore the differences between the military designs of Australia and the world (and how these designs evolved both before and following World War I).

The place possesses uncommon, rare or endangered aspects of the cultural or natural history of New South Wales.

The 75mm field gun at Deniliquin has state heritage significance as one of only three guns of its type in NSW. It is also rare because it is one of only nine weapons captured by the Australian 4th Light Horse Brigade at the iconic battle of Beersheba, the last great cavalry charge in history.

The place is important in demonstrating the principal characteristics of a class of cultural or natural places/environments in New South Wales.

The 75mm field gun at Deniliquin has local heritage significance as a representative example of a war trophy returned to Australia from the conflict of the First World War. Per head of population, Australia had more World War I memorials than any other country in the world and they soon became a popular place of commemoration for the local communities and a powerful symbol of the sacrifices made by the Australian armed forces.

== See also ==
- Military history of Australia
