= Deniliquin Rovers Football Club =

Names
- Full name: Deniliquin Rovers Football & Netball Club
- Nickname(s): Rovers

2024 season
- After finals: 9th
- Home-and-away season: 9th
- Leading goalkicker: Tyson Willis (39)
- Best and fairest: Cam Wills

Club details
- Founded: 1977; 48 years ago
- Competition: Picola & District
- President: John Glowrey
- Coach: Alex Hay
- Captain(s): Rhys McCulloch
- Ground(s): Memorial Park, Deniliquin

Uniforms
Home

Other information
- Official website: Deniliquin Rovers FNC website

The Deniliquin Rovers Football & Netball Club, nicknamed Rovers, is an Australian rules football and netball club playing in the Picola & District Football League. The club is based in the Riverina town of Deniliquin, New South Wales.

== History ==
Many years ago, there was a Deniliquin Rovers FC that played in the defunct Denilquin Half Day Holiday Football Association and won the 1907 premiership and also won the 1928 Deniliquin Football Association premiership.

The current Deniliquin Rovers FNC was established in 1977 to accommodate the large number of local junior football talent available at the time and the club has played all their football in the Picola & District Football League.

The senior football team has been runner up five times - 1978, 1979, 1984, 1985 and 1995.

As of 2025, Deniliquin Rovers have 14 football / netball players who have played 300 plus club games.

== Football Premierships ==
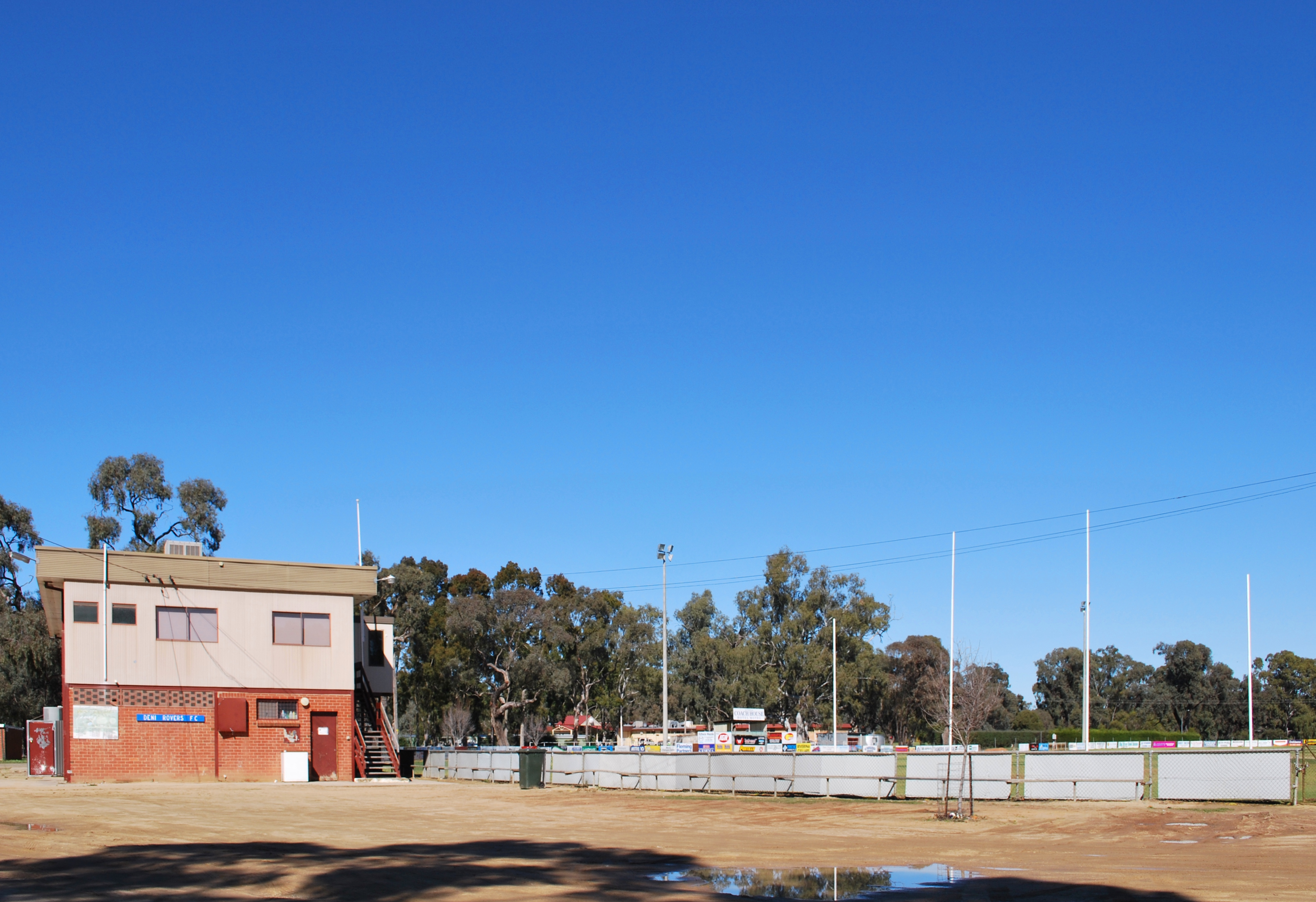
Home ground at Memorial Park

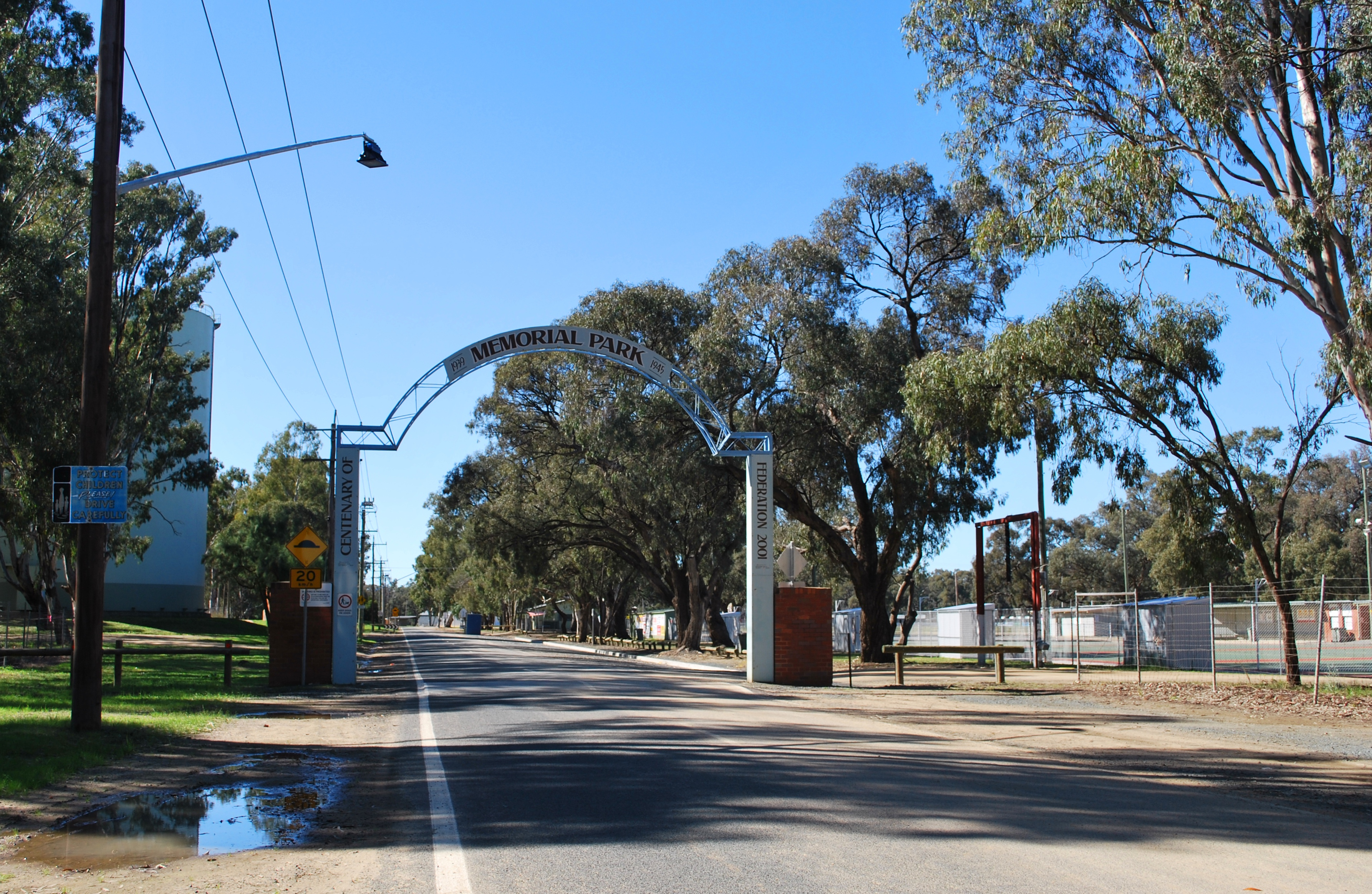
Memorial Park Archway, Deniliquin

- Picola & District Football League
  - Seniors: 2025?
  - Reserves: 1981, 1984, 1986, 2011, 2012, 2013
  - Thirds (U/17's): 1981, 2009, 2015, 2016, 2023
  - Fourths (U/14's): 2013, 2014, 2018

== League Best and Fairest Winners ==
Picola & District Football League

Senior Football - Pearce Medal

- 1994, 1995 - Shane Gilligan
- 2009, 2014, 2016 - Andrew May
- 201? - Josh Bode

Reserves Football - McKenzie Medal

- ?

Thirds Football

- ?

Fourths Football

- ?

== VFL / AFL Players ==
- 1991 - Peter McIntyre

== Best Ever Football Side ==
The Deniliquin Rovers FNC picked their best ever side of senior footballers from 1977 to 2011 to celebrate their first 35 years in the Picola & District Football League.

The criteria was that a footballer had to of played a minimum of 20 senior club matches.

- Backline: P Wilson, P Howley, I Landale
- Half backline: R Rusuggan, J Fitzpatrick, T Martin
- Centreline: Shane Gilligan, B Maslin, C McCulloch
- Half forwardline: I Lackington, N McMahon, S Arthur
- Forwardline: B Bourke, A Brunker, Terry Lumbar
- Followers: B Taylor, Josh Bode, Andrew May
- Interchange: R McCartney, T Todd, G Rudd, G Robinson
- Emergencies: Ron Jennings, Peter McIntyre, Shane Tasker, Colin Tubb
- Coach: Barry McIntyre

== Netball Premierships ==
- Picola & District Football / Netball League
  - A. Grade: 2018, 2023, 2024
  - B. Grade: 2010, 2015, 2024,
  - C. Grade: 2014, 2015, 2023,
  - C. Reserve: 2010, 2015, 2018, 2023,
  - 17 Under: 2005,
  - 15 Under: 2012, 2018, 2024,
  - 13 Under: 2011, 2024

== League Best and Fairest Winners ==
- Picola & District Football / Netball League
  - A. Grade Netball:
    - 2012, 2013, 2016 & 2017 - Lucy Beehag
    - 2023 - Chrissy Hurst
  - B. Grade:
    - 1987 - A Doddridge
    - 2015 - Simon Conn
    - 2022 - Natalie Sampson
    - 2023 - Jackie Thorpe
  - C. Grade:
    - 1995 - N Murrells
    - 2002 - J Caniglia
    - 2014 - Rachel Braybon
    - 2022 - Chloe Bulmer
  - C. Reserve:
    - 2012 - Dimity Bloomfield
    - 2014 - Tegan Arnold
    - 2019 - Maggie Ellis
  - 17 Under:
    - 2019 - Edwina Barclay
  - 15 Under:
    - 2021 - Kate Westcott
  - 13 Under:
    - 2011 - Carissa Holmberg
