= Deniliquin 12 Pounder Rifled Breech-Loading Gun =

- Location within New South Wales Location within Australia
- 35.5355°S 144.9676°E
- Location: 72 End Street, Deniliquin, Edward River Council, New South Wales, Australia

History
- Built: 1855–1864

Site notes
- Architect: Sir William Armstrong

New South Wales Heritage Register
- Official name: 12 Pounder Rifled Breech-Loading Gun (Armstrong) (moveable heritage item); 12 Pdr RBL; 12 Pdr Armstrong
- Type: State heritage (movable / collection)
- Designated: 15 April 2016
- Reference no.: 1947
- Type: Other – Military
- Category: Defence

The 12 Pounder Rifled Breech-Loading Gun is a heritage-listed weapon at 72 End Street, Deniliquin, New South Wales, in state's Riverina region. It was designed by Sir William Armstrong and built from 1855 to 1864. It is also known as 12 Pounder Rifled Breech-Loading Gun (Armstrong) (moveable heritage item), 12 Pdr RBL and 12 Pdr Armstrong. It was added to the New South Wales State Heritage Register on 15 April 2016.

== History ==
Upon its design in 1854 and its introduction into active military service, the 12-pound (5.4 kg) rifled breech-loading gun was an unparalleled technological advancement for the international artillery industry. Designed by Sir William Armstrong, often regarded as the inventor of modern artillery, the new rifled field gun was loaded from the rear which allowed it to fire a greater number of times, and at a greater range with improved accuracy, than the earlier guns loaded through the muzzle at the front. This new technology also introduced a new shape for the projectile - rather than the traditional round ball shape, it was now conical (much like today's bullets). Forged of wrought iron, the breech-loading gun had a rifled barrel with a tapered end that improved the aim of the projectile as it left the barrel and, for the first time in modern artillery, the gun was installed on a two-wheel box carriage which allowed the weapon to be more easily manoeuvred and its barrel elevated.

Although a practicing engineer, Sir William Armstrong turned his skills to artillery in the late 1840s and was soon designing and producing weapons. His most notable achievement (as described above) was the design of the Armstrong breech-loading gun (produced in several calibre ranges including six, nine, 12, 20, 40 and 110 pound models) in gun design for centuries, Armstrong was knighted for his services to the British state in 1859.

Following the outbreak of the Crimean War in 1853, there was some anxiety and sense of paranoia amongst the Australian colonists about safety from invasion. In response, those colonists with means soon developed self-reliant volunteer defence units to protect themselves and their property. Although often self-funded, these units were furnished with arms and ammunition from their respective colonial governments and, in the early 1860s when the Australian colonies started taking delivery of a number of Armstrong's revolutionary rifled breech-loading guns, eight examples of the 12-pound type were acquired. Six guns were received by the Victorian Volunteer Field Artillery in 1864 and, of these, three were transferred to the Rupertswood Half Battery in 1889. Forming part of the Battery of the Victorian Horses Artillery with the Werribee Half Battery, the Rupertswood Half Battery was a mounted military unit funded privately and entirely by Sir William Clarke, a wealthy landowner and philanthropist. Disbanded upon Clarke's death in 1897, his patriotic efforts in supporting the colonial military through the Rupertswood Half Battery were recognised by the Victorian government's Defence Department and two guns were presented to his widow, Janet Lady Clarke.

Upon the marriage of their daughter Lily Vera Montague Clarke to Major George Landale in 1910, one of the guns (donated by the Victorian government) was gifted by Lady Clarke to the newly-weds who transported it to "Dunwilly Station", near Deniliquin. Here the weapon stood (the first and only of its type in NSW) at the entrance to the station for many decades.

In the 1980s, the significance of the 12-pounder rifled breech-loading gun at the station's entrance was finally realised and it underwent conservation works by the Army Apprentices School in 1988/89. Today the gun is in its complete and functioning form and it is displayed, alongside its box carriage and projectiles, in a custom-made, climate controlled structure at the Returned and Services League Club at Deniliquin.

Australia retains a small number of the rifled breech-loading gun (of varying calibres). One 12-pounder guns is retained at the Australian War Memorial, one at Werribee and an incomplete one is being restored and will be then placed in Victoria. The 12-pounder rifled breech-loading gun at Deniliquin is the only example of this gun in NSW.

== Description ==
A mid-19th century cannon with remnant carriage parts and example of projectile, located in a custom-built climate-controlled gazebo structure outside the Deniliquin RSL Club.

Gun display is supported by interpretive plaques and a photograph outlining historical and technical information.

=== Condition ===
As at 1 September 2016, the weapon underwent conservation and refurbishment work by the Army Apprentices School in 1988/89. Today the gun is in its complete and functioning form and it is displayed, alongside its box carriage and projectiles, in a custom-made, climate controlled structure at the Returned and Services League Club at Deniliquin. The gun is in good condition.

The weapon underwent conservation and refurbishment work by the Army Apprentices School in 1988/89. Today the gun is in its complete and functioning form and it is displayed, alongside its box carriage and projectiles, in a custom-made, climate controlled structure at the Returned and Services League Club at Deniliquin.

=== Modifications and dates ===
The weapon underwent conservation and refurbishment work by the Army Apprentices School in 1988/89.

== Heritage listing ==
The 12-pounder rifled breech-loading gun at Deniliquin is of state heritage significance as the only gun of its type in NSW. Furthermore, it is an intact, complete and functioning moveable heritage item that can demonstrate its exceptional array of technical values to the people and state of NSW.

Upon its design in 1854 by British engineer-turned-artillery manufacturer Sir William Armstrong, often regarded as the inventor of modern artillery, the rifled breech-loading gun was an unparalleled technological advancement for the international artillery industry and it was described as one of the greatest steps forward in gun design for centuries.

The rifled breech-loading gun (produced in various calibre ranges including six, nine, 12, 20, 40 and 110 pound models) was an innovative design that revolutionised artillery use across the world. For the first time in history, guns were loaded from the rear which allowed it to fire more rapidly, and at a greater range with improved accuracy, than the earlier guns loaded through the muzzle at the front. This new technology also introduced a new shape for the projectile-rather than the traditional round ball shape, it was now conical (much like today's bullets).

In the early 1860s, the Australian colonies acquired eight examples of the 12-pound type and this particular gun was received by the Victorian Volunteer Field Artillery and later transferred to the private Rupertswood Half Battery. Used from 1864 to 1897 for voluntary defence training rather than combat, the gun had a brief operational life in Victoria before being transferred to a private owner in NSW in 1910.

Following the broader public recognition and identification of the significance of the 12-pounder rifled breech-loading gun in the 1980s and its restoration by 1988, the item has become particularly significant to the artillery community of NSW as the only example in the state that can adequately demonstrate and display the internationally unparalleled advancement of its design. The gun is also the only example of its type where the NSW community can research, learn and understand the exceptional technical values of the rifled breech-loading gun type. The state heritage Inventory provides information about heritage items listed by local and State government agencies. The State Heritage Inventory is continually being updated by local and State agencies as new information becomes available. Read the OEH copyright and disclaimer.

12-Pounder Rifled Breech-Loading Gun was listed on the New South Wales State Heritage Register on 15 April 2016 having satisfied the following criteria.

The place is important in demonstrating the course, or pattern, of cultural or natural history in New South Wales.

Upon its design in 1854 by Sir William Armstrong, often regarded as the inventor of modern artillery, the 12-pounder rifled breech-loading gun was an unparalleled technological advancement for the international artillery industry and it was described as one of the greatest steps forward in gun design for centuries.

In the early 1860s, the Australian colonies acquired eight examples of the 12-pound type and this particular gun was received by the Victorian Volunteer Field Artillery and later transferred to the private Rupertswood Half Battery. Used from 1864 to 1897 for voluntary defence training rather than combat, the gun had a brief operational life in Victoria before being transferred to a private owner in NSW in 1910.

Following the broader public recognition and identification of the historical significance of the 12-pounder rifled breech-loading gun in the 1980s and its restoration by 1988, the item is the only complete example of its type in NSW that can demonstrate the greatest technological advancement in weapon design in international artillery history. This item is particularly significant to the artillery community of NSW as it is the only example in the state that can demonstrate this unparalleled and international historical shift in gun design.

The place has a strong or special association with a person, or group of persons, of importance of cultural or natural history of New South Wales's history.

The 12-pounder rifled breech-loading gun at Deniliquin is associated with a number of significant people and groups, however these people and groups do not have particular significance to the state of NSW.

The gun was designed by British engineer-turned-artillery manufacturer Sir William Armstrong who is often regarded as the inventor of modern artillery. The Armstrong firm, one of the key artillery companies in the mid-to-late 19th century, distributed weapons throughout the British colonial military and Armstrong was knighted for his artillery production and services to the British state in 1859.

The Australian Government acquired eight examples of the 12-pounder rifled breech-loading gun in the early 1860s and the gun at Deniliquin was received by the Victorian Volunteer Field Artillery in 1864. Later, the gun was transferred to Sir William Clarke in 1889 for use at the Rupertswood Half Battery (also in Victoria).

The 12-pounder rifled breech-loading gun at Deniliquin was transported to NSW by Sir William Clarke's daughter following her marriage in 1910. Since its arrival in NSW, the gun at Deniliquin has not been associated with any particularly significant people and groups.

The place is important in demonstrating aesthetic characteristics and/or a high degree of creative or technical achievement in New South Wales.

As the only example of its type in NSW, the 12-pounder rifled breech-loading gun at Deniliquin is of state heritage significance for its exceptional display of technical values. The only intact and functioning example of its type in NSW, this gun was designed by British engineer-turned-artillery manufacturer Sir William Armstrong in 1854 and, upon its production, was regarded as an unparalleled technological advancement for the international artillery industry. Described as one of the greatest steps forward in gun design for centuries, Armstrong was knighted for his services to the British state in 1859.

The rifled breech-loading gun (produced in various calibre ranges including six, nine, 12, 20, 40 and 110 pound models) was an innovative design that revolutionised artillery use across the world. For the first time in history, guns were loaded from the rear which allowed it to fire more rapidly, and at a greater range with improved accuracy, than the earlier guns loaded through the muzzle at the front. This new technology also introduced a new shape for the projectile-rather than the traditional round ball shape, it was now conical (much like today's bullets).

As the only complete and functioning example of this gun type in the state, the 12-pounder rifled breech-loading gun at Deniliquin has state heritage significance as the only item that can adequately demonstrate the technical advancements of the rifled breech-loading gun in NSW.

The place has a strong or special association with a particular community or cultural group in New South Wales for social, cultural or spiritual reasons.

The 12-pounder rifled breech-loading gun at Deniliquin is significant to the artillery community of NSW. It was one of the first significant historical weapons identified by the Royal Australian Artillery Historical Society (now Company) (RAAHC) upon its formation in 1981.

Recognised as being a significant piece of historical artillery in NSW, the gun underwent a pioneering restoration effort under the supervision of RAAHC. Upon the completion of its restoration in 1988, the 12-pounder rifled breech-loading gun at Deniliquin was the only item of its type in Australia in such superior condition (others being in disrepair or private ownership). Identified and catalogued by the RAAHC, the 12-pounder rifled breech-loading gun at Deniliquin was the only complete item of its type that was accessible to the artillery community of NSW (today, a restored 12-pounder rifled breech-loading gun is in Canberra and another in Werribee, Victoria and an incomplete gun can also be found in Karrakatta, Western Australia).

The significance of the 12-pounder rifled breech-loading gun to the artillery community of NSW and in particular to the RAAHC, with an official membership numbering in the hundreds and an interest group in the thousands, demonstrates the social significance of this item to the state of NSW.

The place has potential to yield information that will contribute to an understanding of the cultural or natural history of New South Wales.

As the only example of its type in NSW, the 12-pounder rifled breech-loading gun at Deniliquin is of state heritage significance as an intact and functioning example of a gun type that, when designed by British engineer-turned-artillery manufacturer Sir William Armstrong in 1854, was an unparalleled technological advancement for the international artillery industry.

Further examples of this gun (approximately four in addition to that at Deniliquin) are known to exist in Victoria, Western Australia and Canberra but only the Canberra gun (located at the Australian War Memorial) is comparable to that in Deniliquin for its condition and integrity. For the artillery community of NSW, the Deniliquin gun is the only example in the state that can adequately demonstrate and display the unparalleled advancement of its design and where the community can research, learn and understand the exceptional technical values of the rifled breech-loading gun.

Close analysis of the gun and its elements will demonstrate how this technologically revolutionary design was constructed and how this type of gun (the first in history to be loaded from the rear rather than through the muzzle) changed artillery use on the international stage.

The place possesses uncommon, rare or endangered aspects of the cultural or natural history of New South Wales.

The 12-pounder rifled breech-loading gun at Deniliquin is of state heritage significance as the only example of its gun type in NSW. Further examples of this gun (approximately four in addition to that at Deniliquin) are known to exist in Victoria, Western Australia and Canberra (at the Australian War Memorial) but only the Deniliquin and Canberra guns are in complete, intact and functioning condition.

For the people and state of NSW, the 12-pounder rifled breech-loading gun at Deniliquin is particularly rare as the only remaining example of the revolutionary rifled breech-loading gun type which can demonstrate the unparalleled internationally technological achievement of its design to the people of NSW.

The place is important in demonstrating the principal characteristics of a class of cultural or natural places/environments in New South Wales.

The 12-pounder rifled breech-loading gun at Deniliquin is of state heritage significance to NSW as an exceptional representative example of a gun type that, upon its production and introduction into military service, revolutionised artillery technology and design on an international scale.

As the only complete, intact and functioning example of its type in the state, this 12-pounder rifled breech-loading gun has the capacity to adequately demonstrate to the people of NSW the principle characteristics and significant heritage values of an internationally unparalleled class of artillery.

== See also ==
- Military history of Australia
