= Deniliquin Public School and School Master's Residence =

Deniliquin Public School and School Masters Residence
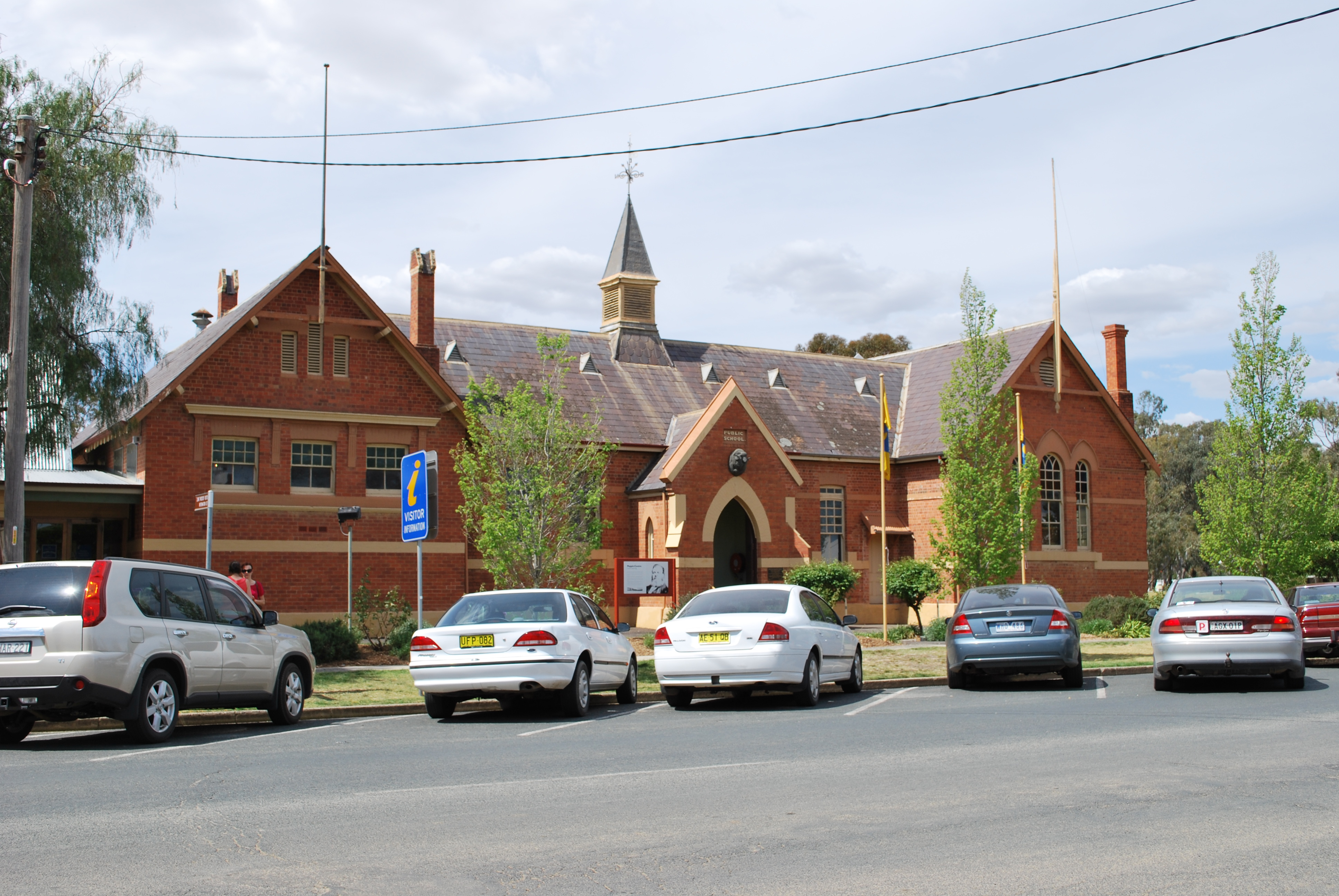

- Location within New South Wales Location within Australia
- 35.5282°S 144.9648°E
- Location: George Street, Deniliquin, Edward River Council, New South Wales, Australia

Site notes
- Owner: Deniliquin Council

New South Wales Heritage Register
- Official name: Public School & School Masters Residence (former); Peppin Heritage Centre
- Type: state heritage (built)
- Designated: 2 April 1999
- Reference no.: 144
- Type: School – State (public)
- Category: Education

Deniliquin Public School and School Masters Residence is a heritage-listed former school and now museum, arts centre and visitor information centre in Deniliquin in the Riverina region of New South Wales, Australia. Located on George Street, it is also known as the Peppin Heritage Centre. The property is owned by the Edward River Council. It was added to the New South Wales State Heritage Register on 2 April 1999.

== History ==
In 1857 a school site was chosen close to the Edward River and in 1861 a brick schoolhouse was erected with a frontage to George Street. A survey revealed that only 138 children out of the 613 living in the area attended school.

In 1879 a new school building was built on the site and for one year the old 1861 school became the schoolmaster's residence. As the building was in bad repair, the school principal, David Kennedy refused to live there and in 1880 the old building was demolished a new schoolmaster's residence was constructed in Gothic Revival style.

In 1899 the school was enlarged and in 1905 another room was added. Two more classrooms and a science room were added in 1928.

The school closed in 1972 and was taken over by the Deniliquin Municipal Council, to be used a museum and arts centre managed by a Museum Trust and the George Street Historical Society.

== Heritage listing ==
Public School & School Masters Residence was listed on the New South Wales State Heritage Register on 2 April 1999.
