= 1940 Brocklesby mid-air collision =

Collision involving Royal Australian Air Force training aircraft

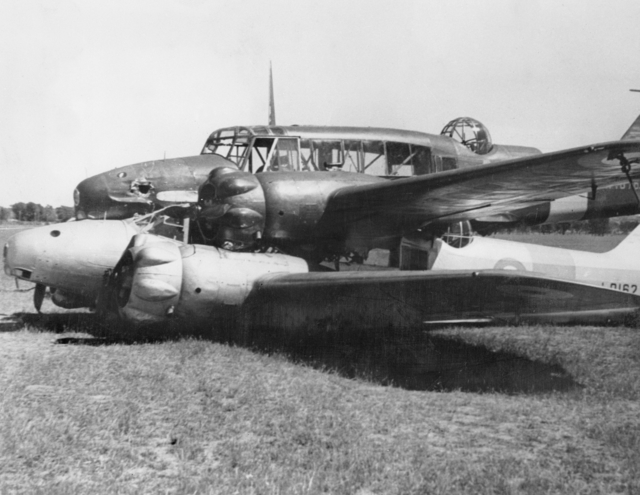
- The Avro Ansons after landing safely, having collided in mid-air and locked together, 29 September 1940

Accident
- Date: 29 September 1940
- Summary: Mid-air collision
- Site: Brocklesby, New South Wales, Australia; 35°51′12″S 146°38′09″E
- Total fatalities: 0
- Total injuries: 1
- Total survivors: 4

First aircraft
- Type: Avro Anson
- Operator: No. 2 Service Flying Training School RAAF
- Registration: N4876
- Flight origin: RAAF Station Forest Hill, New South Wales
- Destination: Corowa, New South Wales
- Occupants: 2
- Crew: 2
- Injuries: 0
- Survivors: 2

Second aircraft
- Type: Avro Anson
- Operator: No. 2 Service Flying Training School RAAF
- Registration: L9162
- Flight origin: RAAF Station Forest Hill, New South Wales
- Destination: Corowa, New South Wales
- Occupants: 2
- Crew: 2
- Injuries: 1
- Survivors: 2

On 29 September 1940, a mid-air collision occurred over Brocklesby, New South Wales, Australia. The accident was unusual in that the aircraft involved, two Royal Australian Air Force (RAAF) Avro Ansons of No. 2 Service Flying Training School, remained locked together after colliding, and then landed safely. The collision stopped the engines of the upper Anson, but those of the one underneath continued to run, allowing the aircraft to keep flying. The navigators of both aircraft and the pilot of the lower Anson bailed out. The pilot of the upper Anson found that he was able to control the interlocked aircraft with his ailerons and flaps, and made an emergency landing in a nearby paddock. All four crewmen survived the incident. The upper Anson was repaired and returned to flight service; the lower Anson was used as an instructional airframe.

== Training school and flight details ==
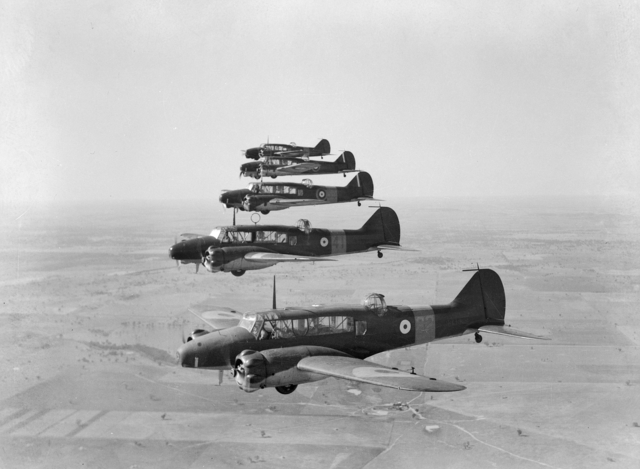
Ansons of No. 2 SFTS in formation

No. 2 Service Flying Training School (SFTS), based at RAAF Station Forest Hill near Wagga Wagga, New South Wales, was one of several pilot training facilities formed in the early years of World War II as part of Australia's contribution to the Empire Air Training Scheme. After basic aeronautical instruction at an elementary flying training school, pupils went on to an SFTS to learn techniques they would require as operational (or "service") pilots, including instrument flying, night flying, cross-country navigation, advanced aerobatics, formation flying, dive bombing, and aerial gunnery. No. 2 SFTS's facilities were still under construction when its first course commenced on 29 July 1940.

On 29 September 1940, two of the school's Avro Ansons took off from Forest Hill for a cross-country training exercise over southern New South Wales. Tail number N4876 was piloted by Leading Aircraftman Leonard Graham Fuller, 22, from Cootamundra, with Leading Aircraftman Ian Menzies Sinclair, 27, from Glen Innes, as navigator. Tail number L9162 was piloted by Leading Aircraftman Jack Inglis Hewson, 19, from Newcastle, with Leading Aircraftman Hugh Gavin Fraser, 27, from Melbourne, as navigator. Their planned route was expected to take them first to Corowa, then to Narrandera, then back to Forest Hill.

== Collision and emergency landing ==
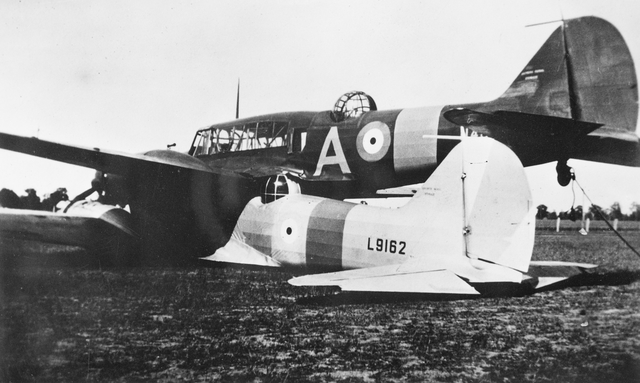
The interlocked Ansons lying in a paddock

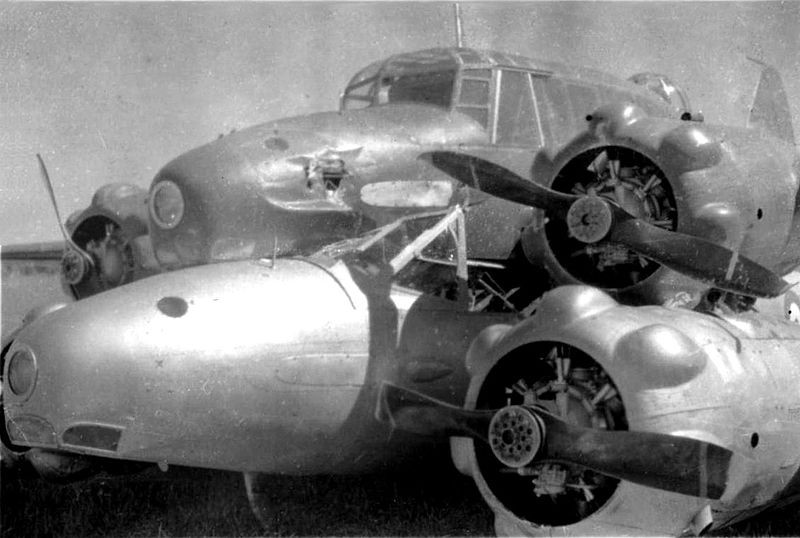
Engines and forward sections of the two aircraft

The Ansons were at an altitude of 300 metres (1,000 ft) over the township of Brocklesby, near Albury, when they made a banking turn. Fuller lost sight of Hewson's aircraft beneath him and the two Ansons collided amid what Fuller later described as a "grinding crash and a bang as roaring propellers struck each other and bit into the engine cowlings". The two aircraft remained jammed together, the lower Anson's turret wedged into the other's port wing root, and its fin and rudder balancing the upper Anson's port tailplane.

Both of the upper aircraft's engines had been knocked out in the collision but those of the one below continued to turn at full power as the interlocked Ansons began to slowly circle. Fuller described the "freak combination" as "lumping along like a brick". He nevertheless found that he was able to control the piggybacking pair of aircraft with his ailerons and flaps, and began searching for a place to land. The two navigators, Sinclair and Fraser, bailed out, followed soon after by the lower Anson's pilot, Hewson, whose back had been injured when the spinning blades of the other aircraft sliced through his fuselage.

Fuller travelled 8 kilometres (5 mi) after the collision, then successfully made an emergency belly landing in a large paddock 6 kilometres (4 mi) south-west of Brocklesby. The locked aircraft slid 180 metres (200 yd) across the grass before coming to rest. As far as Fuller was concerned, the touchdown was better than any he had made when practising circuits and bumps at Forest Hill airfield the previous day. His acting commanding officer, Squadron Leader Cooper, declared the choice of improvised runway "perfect", and the landing itself as a "wonderful effort". The RAAF's Inspector of Air Accidents, Group Captain Arthur "Spud" Murphy, flew straight to the scene from Air Force Headquarters in Melbourne, accompanied by his deputy Henry Winneke. Fuller told Murphy:

Well, sir, I did everything we've been told to do in a forced landing—land as close as possible to habitation or a farmhouse and, if possible, land into the wind. I did all that. There's the farmhouse, and I did a couple of circuits and landed into the wind. She was pretty heavy on the controls, though!

== Aftermath ==
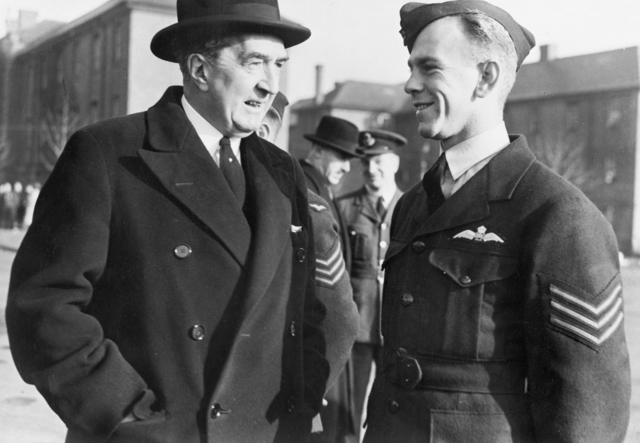
Sergeant Fuller (right) with Australian High Commissioner Stanley Bruce in London, 1941

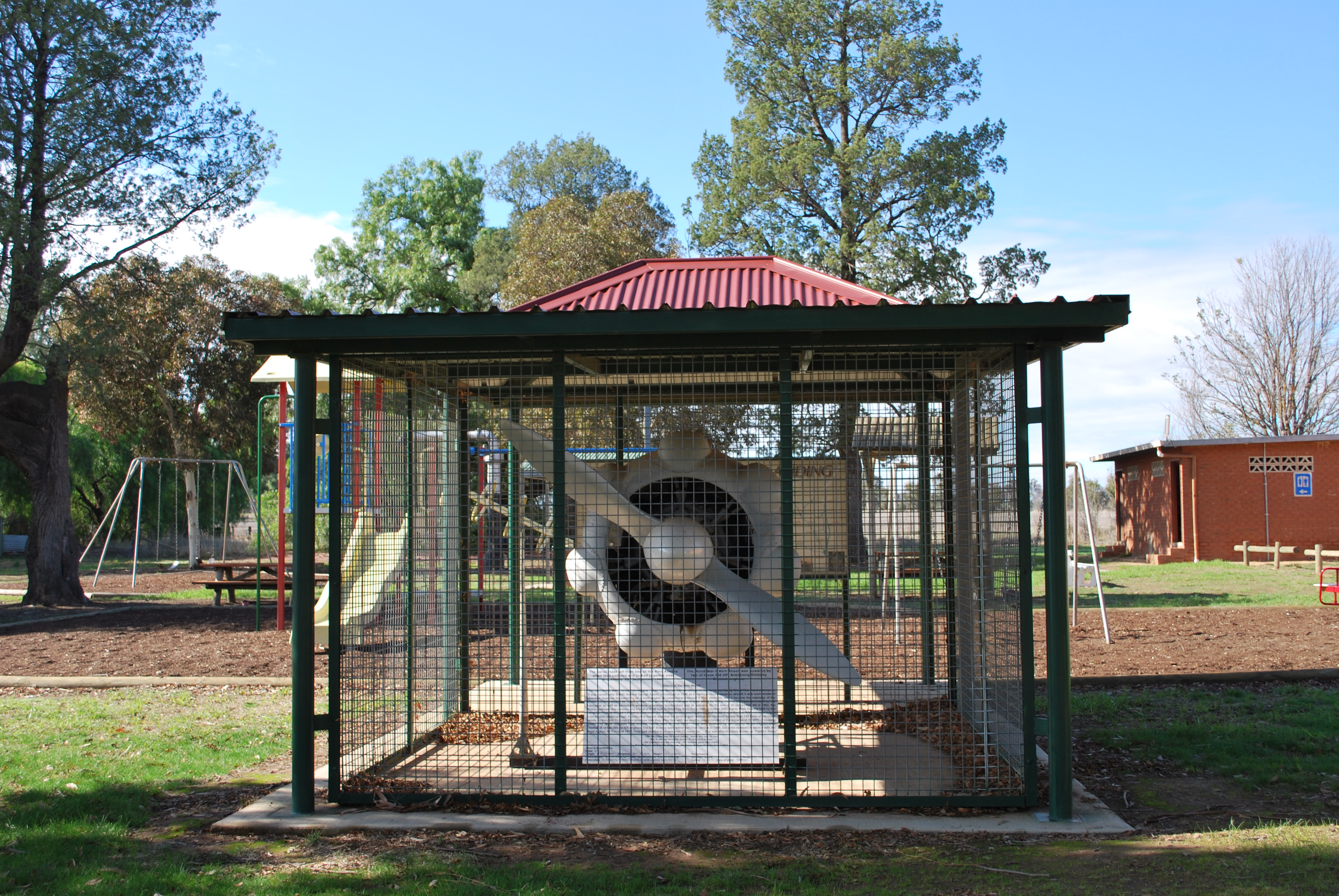
The monument to the accident in Brocklesby, 2009

The freak accident garnered news coverage around the world, and cast a spotlight on the small town of Brocklesby. In preventing the destruction of the Ansons, Fuller was credited not only with avoiding possible damage to Brocklesby, but with saving approximately £40,000 (approximately AU$4.7 million in 2022 terms) (Note: Using GDP deflator for capital costs, and allowing for change in currency from pounds to dollars in 1966. Calculated using data available at MeasuringWorth.com on 29 September 2023.) worth of military hardware. Both Ansons were repaired; the top aircraft (N4876) returned to flight service, and the lower (L9162) was used as an instructional airframe. Hewson was treated for his back injury at Albury District Hospital and returned to active duty; he graduated from No. 2 SFTS in October 1940. He was discharged from the Air Force as a flight lieutenant in 1946. Sinclair was discharged in 1945, also a flight lieutenant. Fraser was posted to Britain and flew as a pilot officer with No. 206 Squadron RAF, based in Aldergrove, Northern Ireland. He and his crew of three died on 1 January 1942 during a routine training flight, when their Lockheed Hudson collided with a tree.

Fuller was promoted to sergeant after his successful landing, but also confined to barracks for fourteen days and docked seven days' pay for speaking about the incident to newspapers without authorisation. He graduated from No. 2 SFTS in October 1940, and received a commendation from the Australian Air Board for his "presence of mind, courage and determination in landing the locked Ansons without serious damage to the aircraft under difficult conditions". Fuller saw active service first in the Middle East, and then in Europe with No. 37 Squadron RAF. He earned the Distinguished Flying Medal for his actions over Palermo in March 1942. Commissioned later that year, Fuller was posted back to Australia as a flying officer, and became an instructor at No. 1 Operational Training Unit in Sale, Victoria. He died near Sale on 18 March 1944, when he was hit by a bus while riding his bicycle.

== Legacy ==
According to the Greater Hume Shire Council, the 1940 mid-air collision remains Brocklesby's "main claim to fame". Local residents commemorated the 50th anniversary of the event by erecting a marker near the site of the crash landing; it was unveiled by Tim Fischer, the Federal Member for Farrer and Leader of the National Party, on 29 September 1990. On 26 January 2007, a memorial featuring an Avro Anson engine was opened during Brocklesby's Australia Day celebrations.
