= Deniliquin Airport =

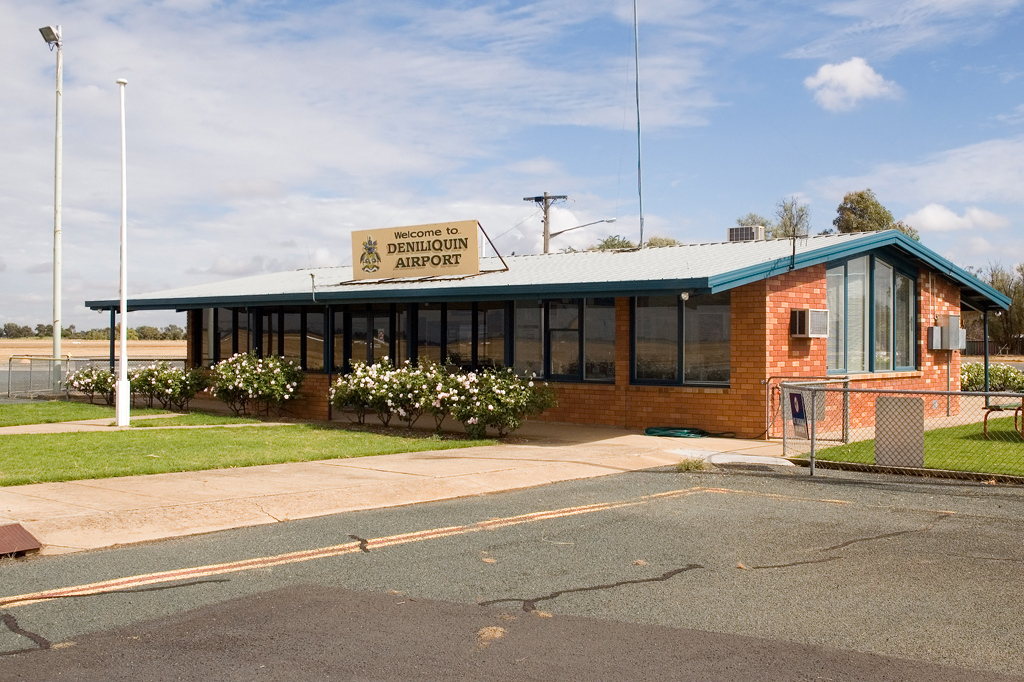
- IATA: DNQ; ICAO: YDLQ

Summary
- Airport type: Public
- Operator: Edward River Council
- Location: Deniliquin, New South Wales, Australia
- Elevation AMSL: 316 ft / 96 m
- Coordinates: 35°33′16.5456″S 144°56′56.6088″E

Map
- Location in New South Wales

Runways
Direction	Length		Surface
Direction	m	ft	Surface
06/24	1,219	3,999	Asphalt
12/30	1,487	4,879	Dirt/grass
- Sources: AIP ERSA

Deniliquin Airport (IATA: DNQ, ICAO: YDLQ) is an airport located 2 nautical miles (3.7 km; 2.3 mi) south of Deniliquin, a town in the Riverina region of New South Wales, Australia.

== RAAF Station Deniliquin ==
RAAF Station Deniliquin was formed in 1941 as a station for the Royal Australian Air Force (RAAF), during the Second World War, at the airfield as part of the Empire Air Training Scheme as No. 7 Service Flying Training School.

It was also a final disbanding site for squadrons returning from active duty against the Japanese in the Pacific. No. 22 Squadron RAAF and No. 30 Squadron RAAF were disbanded here in 1946, and in 1945 and 1946 it was also a base for No. 78 Squadron RAAF before it was finally disbanded in Williamtown.

== See also ==
- List of airports in New South Wales
