= No. 7 Service Flying Training School RAAF =

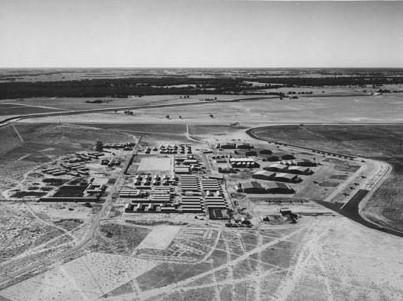
- Deniliquin aerodrome, home of No. 7 Service Service Flying Training School, 1941–44
- Active: 1941–46
- Allegiance: Australia
- Branch: Royal Australian Air Force
- Role: Intermediate/advanced flying training
- Part of: Southern Area Command
- Garrison/HQ: RAAF Station Deniliquin

No. 7 Service Flying Training School (No. 7 SFTS) was a flying training school of the Royal Australian Air Force (RAAF) during World War II. It was formed in June 1941, and commenced flying the following month. Responsible for intermediate and advanced instruction of pilots under the Empire Air Training Scheme (EATS), the school was based at RAAF Station Deniliquin, New South Wales, and operated CAC Wirraway single-engined trainers. The Wirraways were classed as reserve aircraft for Australia's defence in response to the outbreak of the Pacific War in December 1941. Having graduated over 2,000 pilots, the school was renamed the Advanced Flying and Refresher Unit (AFRU) in December 1944. AFRU was disbanded in May 1946.

== History ==
RAAF aircrew training expanded dramatically following the outbreak of World War II, in response to Australia's participation in the Empire Air Training Scheme (EATS). The Air Force's pre-war flight training facility, No. 1 Flying Training School at RAAF Station Point Cook, Victoria, was supplanted in 1940–41 by twelve Elementary Flying Training Schools (EFTS), eight Service Flying Training Schools (SFTS), and Central Flying School (CFS). While CFS turned out new flight instructors, the EFTS provided basic training to prospective pilots who, if successful, would go on to an SFTS for further instruction that focussed on operational (or "service") flying. The course at SFTS typically consisted of two streams, intermediate and advanced, and included such techniques as instrument flying, night flying, advanced aerobatics, formation flying, dive bombing, and aerial gunnery. The total duration of training varied during the war as demand for aircrew rose and fell. Initially running for 16 weeks, the course was cut to 10 weeks (which included 75 hours flying time) in October 1940. A year later it was raised to 12 weeks (including 100 hours flying time), and again to 16 weeks two months later. It continued to increase after this, peaking at 28 weeks in June 1944.

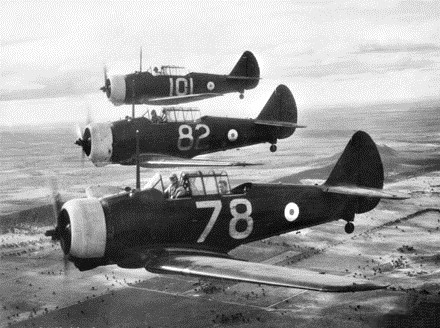
Wirraways of No. 2 SFTS, c. July 1941; No. 7 SFTS also operated the type, and inherited aircraft from No. 2 SFTS when it disbanded in April 1942

No. 7 Service Flying Training School (No. 7 SFTS) was formed at RAAF Station Deniliquin, New South Wales, on 30 June 1941, and came under the control of Southern Area Command. Its inaugural commanding officer was Wing Commander Stuart Campbell. Deniliquin was a new air base, and its facilities were still under construction when the first course of instruction commenced with 50 students flying CAC Wirraways on 28 July. As was typical for a service flying school, No. 7 SFTS suffered several accidents, resulting from pilot error, mechanical faults, fuel exhaustion, and collisions on the ground and in the air. At least 29 instructors and students were killed during training.

Following the outbreak of the Pacific War in December 1941, the Wirraways at Deniliquin were classified as second-line (reserve) aircraft in the defence of Australia. In April 1942, the RAAF Air Board rationalised EATS facilities in southern New South Wales, disbanding No. 2 Service Flying Training School at RAAF Station Forest Hill, near Wagga Wagga, and dividing its staff and aircraft between No. 7 SFTS and No. 5 Service Flying Training School at RAAF Station Uranquinty. No. 7 SFTS's final course of instruction commenced on 29 August 1944. On 16 December, by which time it had graduated 2,206 pilots, the school was re-formed as the Advanced Flying and Refresher Unit (AFRU). AFRU itself disbanded on 1 May 1946. Deniliquin was the final destination of various RAAF units returning from the Pacific War for disbandment, including No. 80 Squadron in July 1946, and Nos. 22 and 30 Squadrons the following month.
