= Barry McIntyre =

Australian rules footballer

Personal information
- Full name: Barry McIntyre
- Born: 9 August 1937 (age 89)
- Original team: Rochester
- Height: 185 cm (6 ft 1 in)
- Weight: 79 kg (174 lb)

Playing career^{1}
Years	Club	Games (Goals)
1958, 1960	St Kilda	11 (10)
- ^{1} Playing statistics correct to the end of 1960.

Barry McIntyre (born 9 August 1937) is a former Australian rules footballer who played for the St Kilda Football Club in the Victorian Football League (VFL).
