= Royal Australian Air Force =

Air warfare and space branch of the Australian Defence Force

- RAAF Badge ; RAAF Logo
- Founded: 31 March 1921 (105 years ago)
- Country: Australia
- Type: Air and space force
- Role: Aerial warfare
- Size: 16,085 Active personnel 5,499 Reserve personnel 288 Aircraft (including 20 UAVs)
- Part of: Australian Defence Force
- Headquarters: Russell Offices, Canberra
- Mottos: Latin: Per Ardua ad Astra "Through Struggle to the Stars"
- March: Royal Australian Air Force March Past; ("Eagles of Australia"), by Sqn Ldr Ron Mitchell
- Anniversaries: RAAF Anniversary Commemoration – 31 March
- Engagements: Second World War; Berlin Airlift; Korean War; Malayan Emergency; Indonesia–Malaysia Confrontation; Vietnam War; East Timor; War in Afghanistan; Iraq War; Military intervention against ISIL; 2026 Iran war
- Website: airforce.gov.au

Commanders
- Chief of the Defence Force: Admiral Mark Hammond
- Chief of the Air Force: Air Marshal Stephen Chappell
- Deputy Chief of the Air Force: Air Vice-Marshal Steve Pesce
- Air Commander Australia: Air Vice-Marshal Harvey Reynolds
- Warrant Officer of the Air Force: Warrant Officer of the Air Force Ralph Clifton

Insignia
- Roundel

- Fin flash

- Ensign

Aircraft flown
- Electronic warfare: EA-18G Growler, E-7A Wedgetail, MC-55A Peregrine
- Fighter: F-35A Lightning II, F/A-18F Super Hornet
- Patrol: MQ-4C Triton, P-8A Poseidon
- Trainer: PC-21, Hawk 127, KA350
- Transport: C-130J Hercules, C-17A Globemaster III, 737 MAX 8 BBJ, Falcon 7X, C-27J Spartan
- Tanker: KC-30A MRTT

The Royal Australian Air Force (RAAF) is the principal aerial warfare force of Australia, a part of the Australian Defence Force (ADF) along with the Royal Australian Navy and the Australian Army. Constitutionally, the governor-general of Australia is the de jure commander-in-chief of the Australian Defence Force. The Royal Australian Air Force is commanded by the Chief of Air Force (CAF), who is subordinate to the Chief of the Defence Force (CDF). The CAF is also directly responsible to the Minister for Defence, with the Department of Defence administering the ADF and the Air Force.

Formed in March 1921, as the Australian Air Force, through the separation of the Australian Air Corps from the Army in January 1920, which in turn combined the separate aerial services of both the Army and Navy. It directly continues the traditions of the Australian Flying Corps (AFC), the aviation corps of the Army that fought in the First World War and that was formed on 22 October 1912.

During its history, the Royal Australian Air Force has fought in a number of major wars, including the Second World War in Europe and the Pacific, participated in the Berlin Airlift, Korean War, Malayan Emergency, Indonesia–Malaysia Confrontation, Vietnam War, and more recently, operations in East Timor, the Iraq War and subsequent intervention, and the War in Afghanistan.

The RAAF operates the majority of the ADF's fixed wing aircraft, although both the Australian Army and Royal Australian Navy also operate aircraft in various roles; it operates no helicopters. The RAAF provides support across a spectrum of operations such as air superiority, precision strikes, intelligence, surveillance, and reconnaissance, air mobility, space surveillance, and humanitarian support. The RAAF has 288 aircraft.

== History ==
=== Formation ===
The RAAF traces its history back to the 1911 Imperial Conference that was held in London, where it was decided that aviation should be developed within the armed forces of the British Empire. Australia implemented this decision, the first dominion to do so, by approving the establishment of the "Australian Aviation Corps". This initially consisted of the Central Flying School at Point Cook, Victoria, opening on 22 October 1912. By 1914 the corps was known as the "Australian Flying Corps".

=== First World War ===
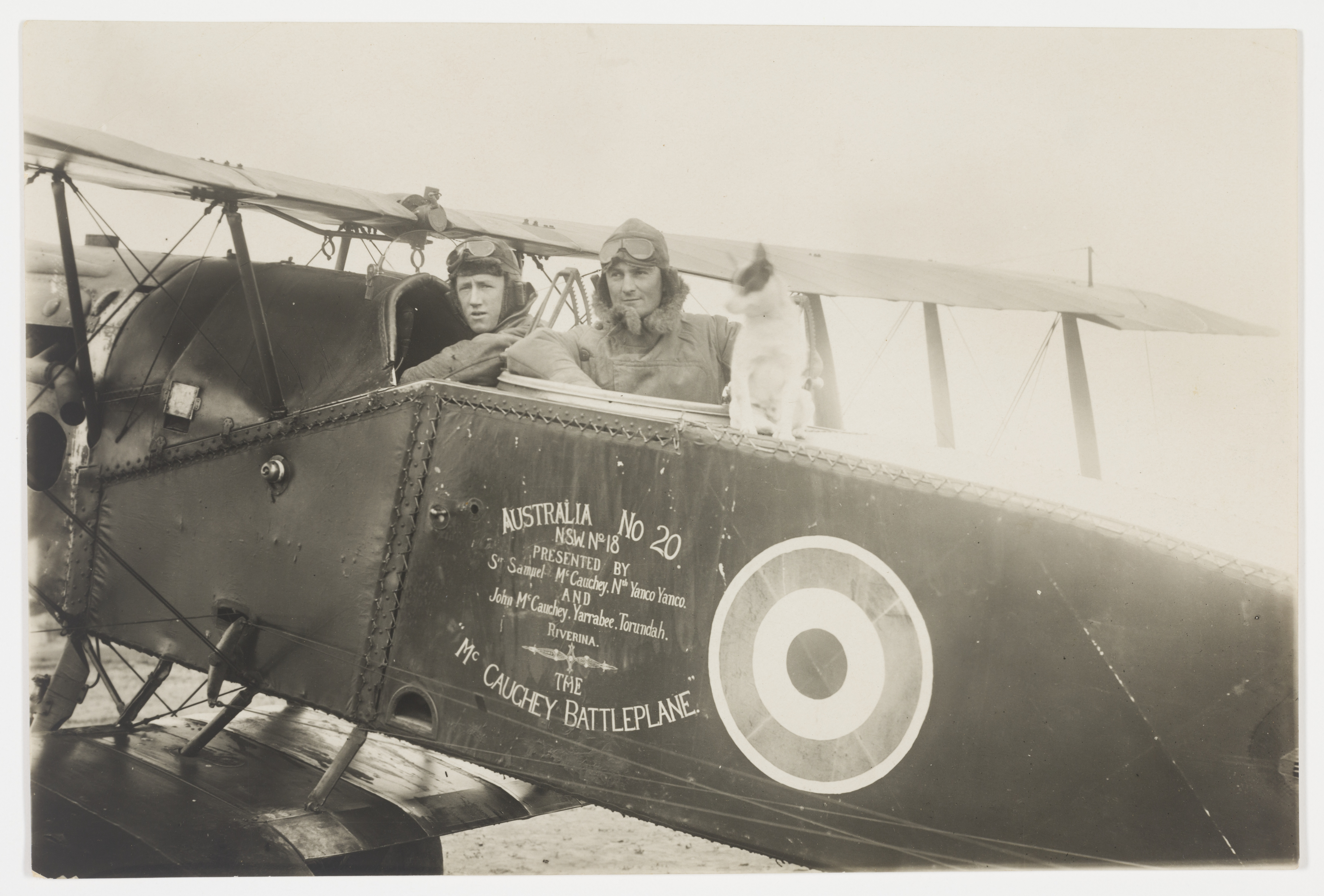
Australian Flying Corps Bristol Fighter F-2B (McCaughey Battleplane), Palestine, 1918

Soon after the outbreak of war in 1914, the Australian Flying Corps sent aircraft to assist in capturing German colonies in what is now north-east New Guinea. However, these colonies surrendered quickly, before the planes were even unpacked. The first operational flights did not occur until 27 May 1915, when the Mesopotamian Half Flight was called upon to assist the Indian Army in providing air support during the Mesopotamian Campaign against the Ottoman Empire, in what is now Iraq.

The corps later saw action in Egypt, Palestine and on the Western Front throughout the remainder of the First World War. By the end of the war, four squadrons—Nos. 1, 2, 3 and 4—had seen operational service, while another four training squadrons—Nos. 5, 6, 7 and 8—had also been established. A total of 460 officers and 2,234 other ranks served in the AFC, whilst another 200 men served as aircrew in the British flying services. Casualties included 175 dead, 111 wounded, 6 gassed and 40 captured.

=== Inter-war period ===
The Australian Flying Corps remained part of the Australian Army until 1919, when it was disbanded along with the First Australian Imperial Force (AIF). Although the Central Flying School continued to operate at Point Cook, military flying virtually ceased until 1920, when the interim Australian Air Corps (AAC), with a wing each for the Army and the Navy, was formed as a unit of the Army. The AAC was succeeded by the Australian Air Force which was formed on 31 March 1921. King George V approved the prefix "Royal" in May 1921 and became effective on 13 August 1921. The RAAF then became the second Royal air arm to be formed in the British Commonwealth, following the British Royal Air Force. When formed the RAAF had more aircraft than personnel, with 21 officers and 128 other ranks and 153 aircraft.

As British aircraft manufacturers at the time were unable to meet Australian requirements, in addition to British production demands, the Australian government purchased some American aircraft and enabled the privately-owned Commonwealth Aircraft Corporation to be established in 1936.

=== Second World War ===
==== Europe and the Mediterranean ====
In September 1939, the Australian Air Board directly controlled the Air Force via RAAF Station Laverton, RAAF Station Richmond, RAAF Station Pearce, No. 1 Flying Training School RAAF at Point Cook, RAAF Station Rathmines and five smaller units.

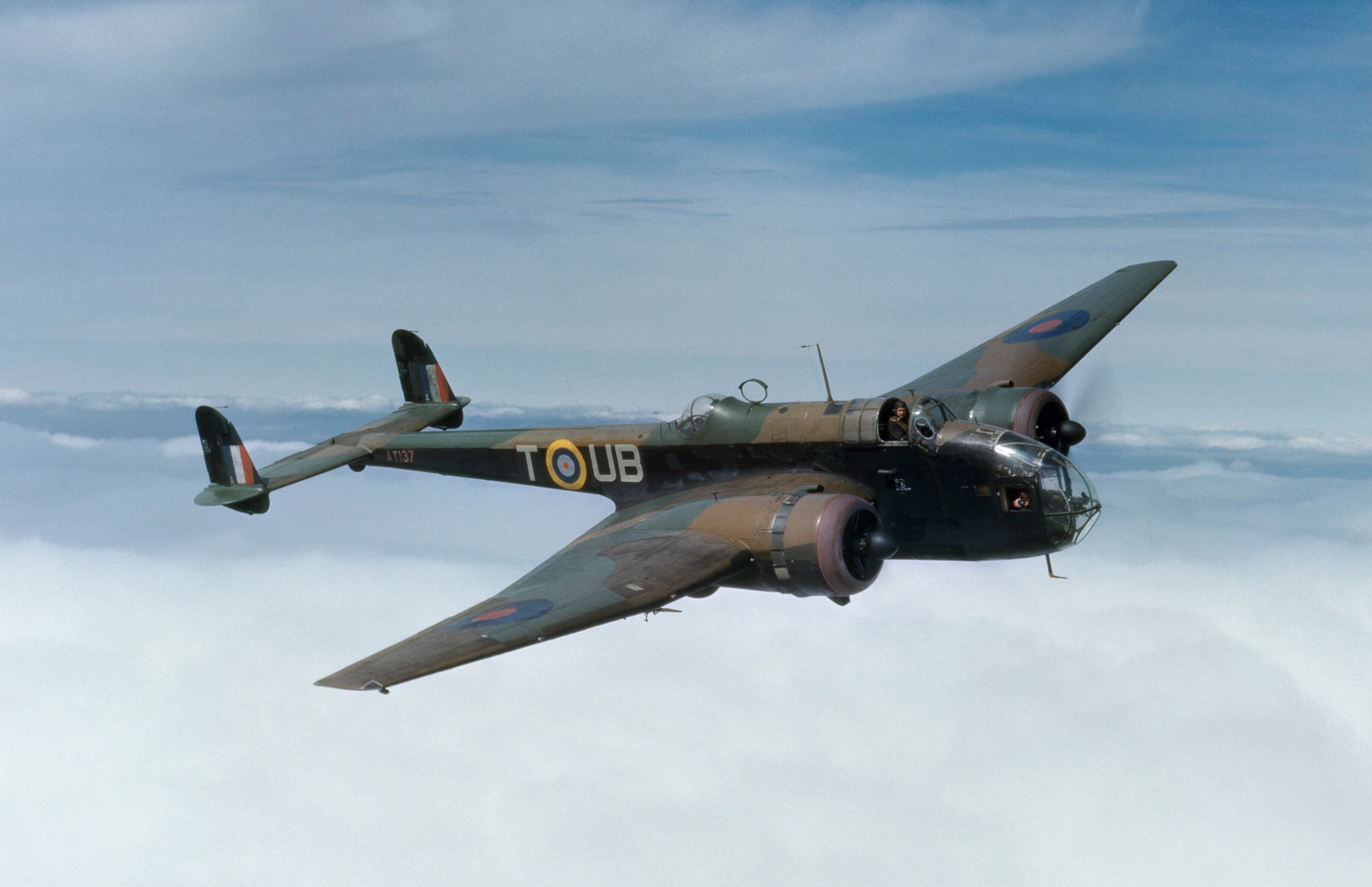
A Handley Page Hampden of No. 455 Squadron, based at RAF Leuchars in Scotland, 1942

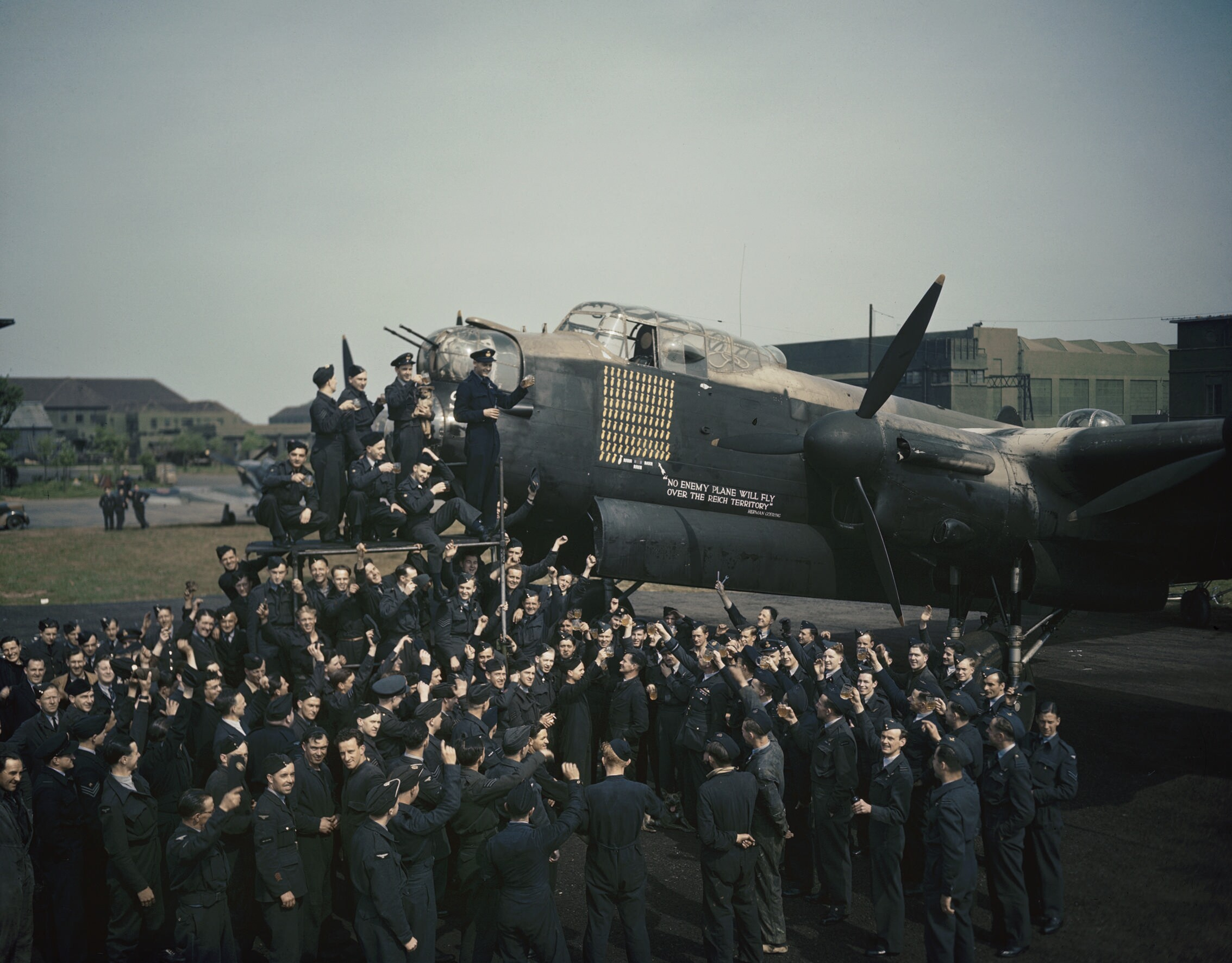
The aircrew and ground staff of No. 467 Squadron at RAF Waddington, England, celebrate Avro Lancaster R5868 "S for Sugar" completing 100 operations, 1944

In 1939, just after the outbreak of the Second World War, Australia joined the Empire Air Training Scheme, under which flight crews received basic training in Australia before travelling to Canada for advanced training. A total of 17 RAAF bomber, fighter, reconnaissance and other squadrons served initially in Britain and with the Desert Air Force located in North Africa and the Mediterranean. Thousands of Australians also served with other Commonwealth air forces in Europe during the Second World War. About nine percent of the personnel who served under British RAF commands in Europe and the Mediterranean were RAAF personnel.

With British manufacturing targeted by the German Luftwaffe, in 1941 the Australian government created the Department of Aircraft Production (DAP; later known as the Government Aircraft Factories) to supply Commonwealth air forces, and the RAAF was eventually provided with large numbers of locally built versions of British designs such as the DAP Beaufort torpedo bomber, Beaufighters and Mosquitos, as well as other types such as Wirraways, Boomerangs, and Mustangs.

In the European theatre of the war, RAAF personnel were especially notable in RAF Bomber Command: although they represented just two percent of all Australian enlistments during the war, they accounted for almost twenty percent of those killed in action. No. 460 Squadron RAAF, mostly flying Avro Lancasters from 1942, had an official establishment of about 200 aircrew and yet had 1,018 combat deaths of which about half were Australian. The squadron was therefore effectively wiped out five times over. Total RAAF casualties in Europe were 5,488 killed or missing.

==== Pacific War ====
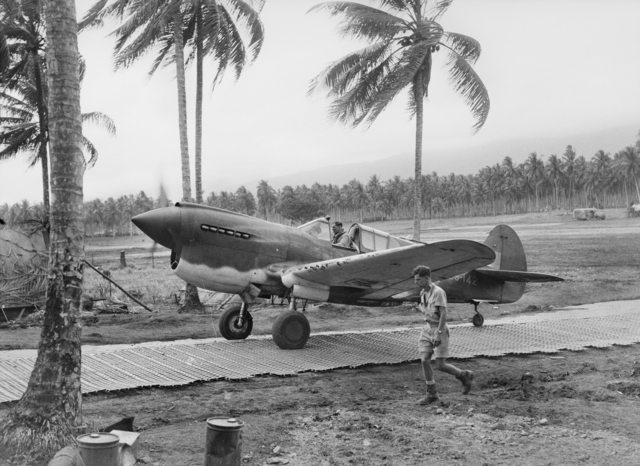
P-40E Kittyhawk piloted by Keith Truscott, commander of No. 76 Squadron, at Milne Bay, New Guinea in 1942

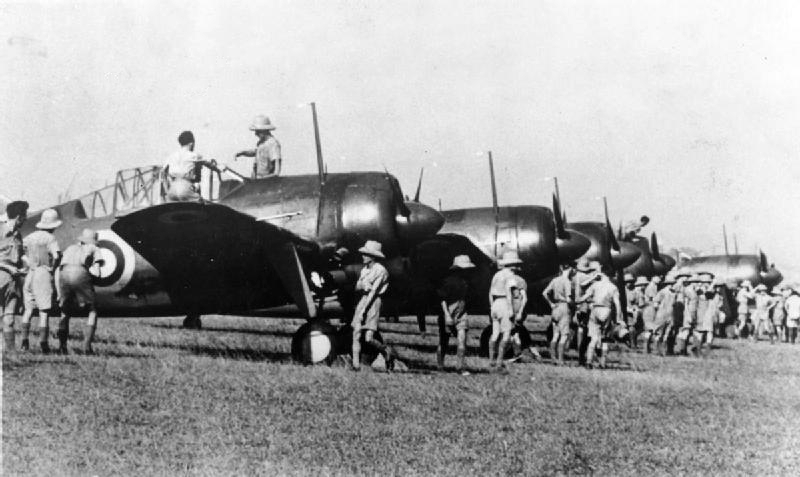
The Brewster F2A Buffalo participated in air campaigns over Malayan, Singapore and Dutch East Indies.

The beginning of the Pacific War—and the rapid advance of Japanese forces—threatened the Australian mainland for the first time in its history. The RAAF was quite unprepared for the emergency, and initially had negligible forces available for service in the Pacific. In 1941 and early 1942, many RAAF airmen, including Nos. 1, 8, 21 and 453 Squadrons, saw action with the RAF Far East Command in the Malayan, Singapore and Dutch East Indies campaigns. Equipped with aircraft such as the Brewster Buffalo, and Lockheed Hudsons, the Australian squadrons suffered heavily against Japanese Zeros.

During the fighting for Rabaul in early 1942, No. 24 Squadron RAAF fought a brief, but ultimately futile defence as the Japanese advanced south towards Australia. The devastating air raids on Darwin on 19 February 1942 increased concerns about the direct threat facing Australia. In response, some RAAF squadrons were transferred from the Northern Hemisphere—although a substantial number remained there until the end of the war. Shortages of fighter and ground attack planes led to the acquisition of US-built Curtiss P-40 Kittyhawks and the rapid design and manufacture of the first Australian fighter, the CAC Boomerang. RAAF Kittyhawks came to play a crucial role in the New Guinea and Solomon Islands campaigns, especially in operations like the Battle of Milne Bay. As a response to a possible Japanese chemical warfare threat the RAAF imported hundreds of thousands of chemical weapons into Australia.

In the Battle of the Bismarck Sea, imported Bristol Beaufighters proved to be highly effective ground attack and maritime strike aircraft. Beaufighters were later made locally by the DAP from 1944. Although it was much bigger than Japanese fighters, the Beaufighter had the speed to outrun them. The RAAF operated a number of Consolidated PBY Catalina as long-range bombers and scouts. The RAAF's heavy bomber force was predominantly made up of 287 B-24 Liberators, equipping seven squadrons, which could bomb Japanese targets as far away as Borneo and the Philippines from airfields in Australia and New Guinea. By late 1945, the RAAF had received or ordered about 500 P-51 Mustangs, for fighter/ground attack purposes. The Commonwealth Aircraft Corporation initially assembled US-made Mustangs, but later manufactured most of those used.

By mid-1945, the RAAF's main operational formation in the Pacific, the First Tactical Air Force (1st TAF), consisted of over 21,000 personnel, while the RAAF as a whole consisted of about 50 squadrons and 6,000 aircraft, of which over 3,000 were operational. The 1st TAF's final campaigns were fought in support of Australian ground forces in Borneo, but had the war continued some of its personnel and equipment would likely have been allocated to the invasion of the Japanese mainland, along with some of the RAAF bomber squadrons in Europe, which were to be grouped together with British and Canadian squadrons as part of the proposed Tiger Force. However, the war was brought to a sudden end by the US nuclear attacks on Japan. The RAAF's casualties in the Pacific were around 2,000 killed, wounded or captured.

By the time the war ended, a total of 216,900 men and women served in the RAAF, of whom 10,562 were killed in action; a total of 76 squadrons were formed. With over 152,000 personnel operating nearly 6,000 aircraft it was the world's fourth-largest air force.

=== Cold War ===
==== Postwar ====
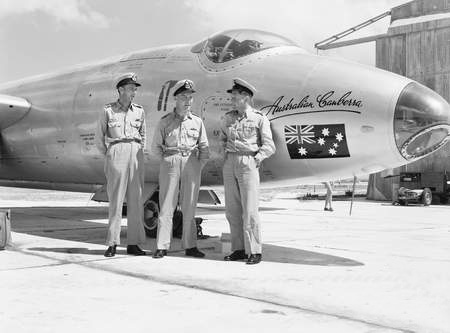
Peter Raw, Bill Kerr, and Noel Davis with their English Electric Canberra in Malta, about to start the 1953 London to Christchurch air race

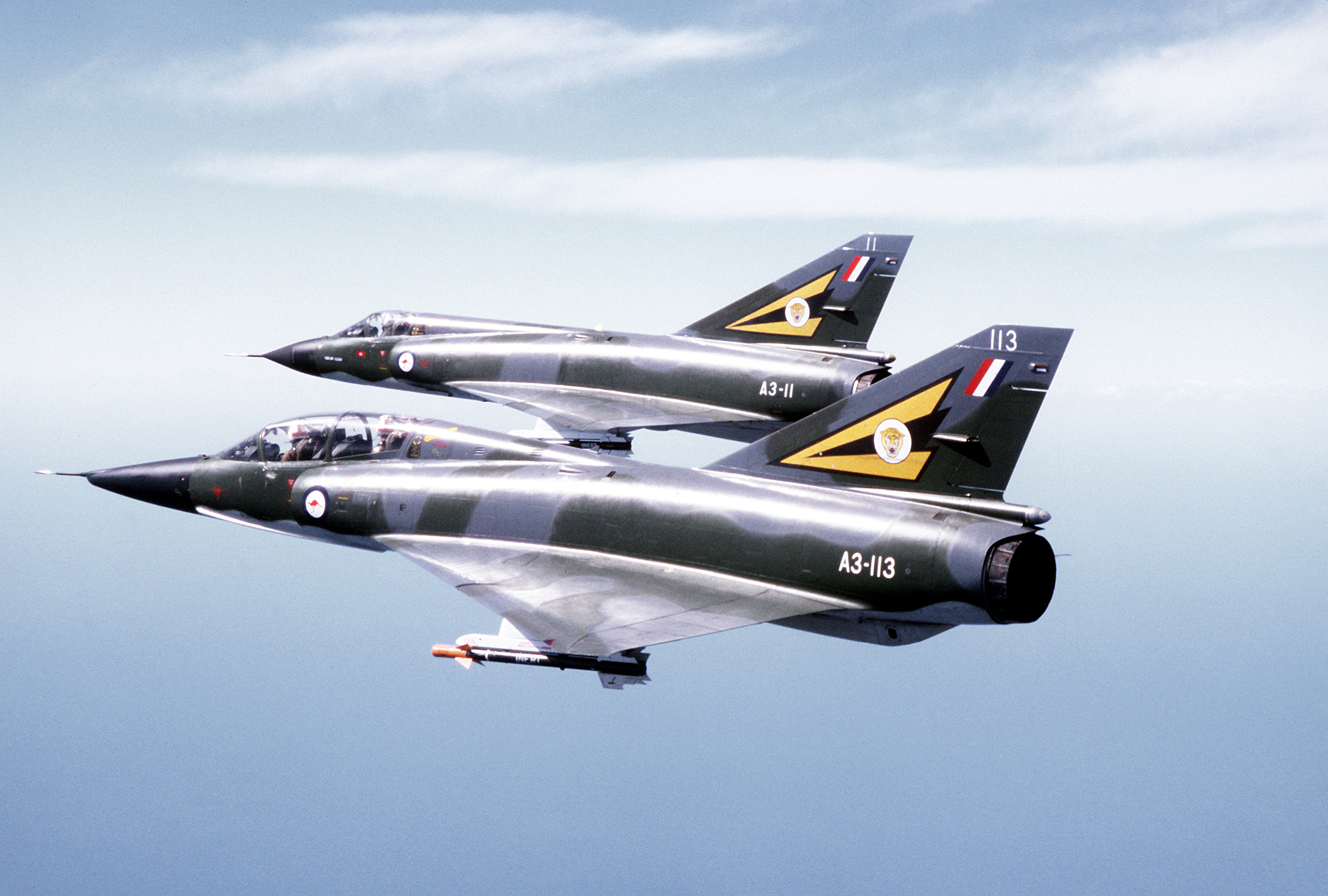
RAAF Mirage III fighters from No. 2 Operational Conversion Unit in 1980

During the Berlin Airlift, in 1948–49, the RAAF Squadron Berlin Air Lift aided the international effort to fly in supplies to the stricken city; two RAF Avro York aircraft were also crewed by RAAF personnel. Although a small part of the operation, the RAAF contribution was significant, flying 2,062 sorties and carrying 7,030 tons of freight and 6,964 passengers.

In the Korean War, from 1950 to 1953, North American Mustangs from No. 77 Squadron RAAF, stationed in Japan with the British Commonwealth Occupation Force, were among the first United Nations aircraft to be deployed, in ground support, combat air patrol, and escort missions. When the UN planes were confronted by North Korean Mikoyan-Gurevich MiG-15 jet fighters, 77 Sqn acquired Gloster Meteor jets, however the MiGs remained superior and the Meteors were relegated to ground support missions as the North Koreans gained experience. The air force also operated transport aircraft during the conflict. No. 77 Squadron flew 18,872 sorties, claiming the destruction of 3,700 buildings, 1,408 vehicles, 16 bridges, 98 railway carriages and an unknown number of enemy personnel. Three MiG-15s were confirmed destroyed, and two others probably destroyed. RAAF casualties included 41 killed and seven captured; 66 aircraft – 22 Mustangs and 44 Meteors – were lost.

In July 1952, No. 78 Wing RAAF was deployed to Malta in the Mediterranean where it formed part of a British force which sought to counter the Soviet Union's influence in the Middle East as part of Australia's Cold War commitments. Consisting of No. 75 and 76 Squadrons equipped with de Havilland Vampire jet fighters, the wing provided an air garrison for the island for the next two and half years, returning to Australia in late 1954.

In 1953, a Royal Air Force officer, Air Marshal Sir Donald Hardman, was brought out to Australia to become Chief of the Air Staff. He reorganised the RAAF into three commands: Home Command, Maintenance Command, and Training Command. Five years later, Home Command was renamed Operational Command, and Training Command and Maintenance Command were amalgamated to form Support Command.

==== South East Asia operations ====
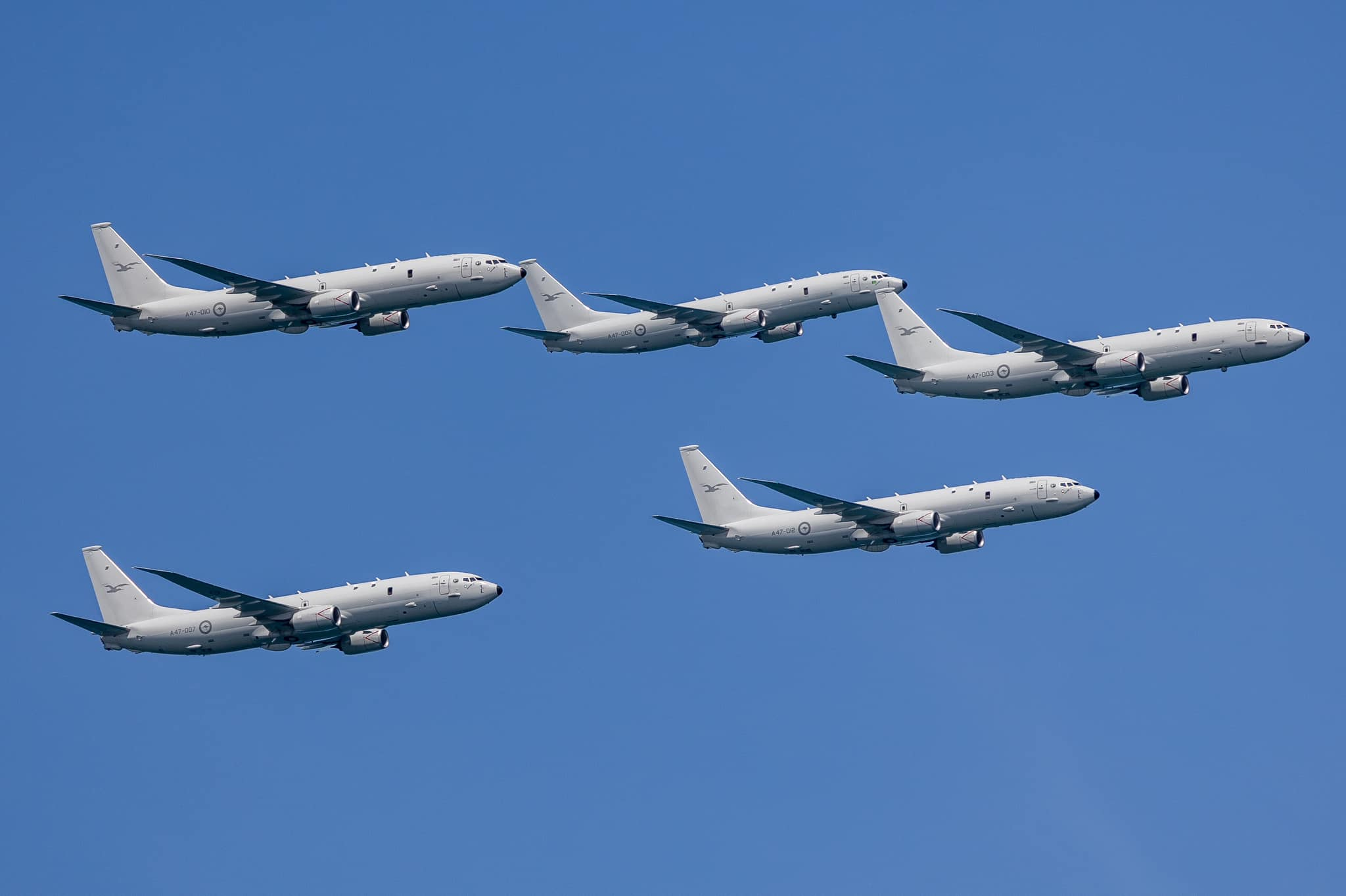
P-8A Poseidons from No. 11 Squadron at RAAF Base Edinburgh in 2024

In the Malayan Emergency, from 1950 to 1960, six Avro Lincolns heavy bombers from No. 1 Squadron RAAF and a flight of Douglas Dakotas from No. 38 Squadron RAAF took part in operations against the communist guerrillas (labelled as "Communist Terrorists" by the British authorities) as part of the RAF Far East Air Force. The Dakotas were used on cargo runs, in troop movement and in paratrooper and leaflet drops within Malaya. The Lincolns, operating from bases in Singapore and from Kuala Lumpur, formed the backbone of the air war against the CTs, conducting bombing missions against their jungle bases. Although results were often difficult to assess, they allowed the government to harass CT forces, attack their base camps when identified and keep them on the move. Later, in 1958, Canberra bombers from No. 2 Squadron RAAF were deployed to Malaya and took part in bombing missions against the CTs.

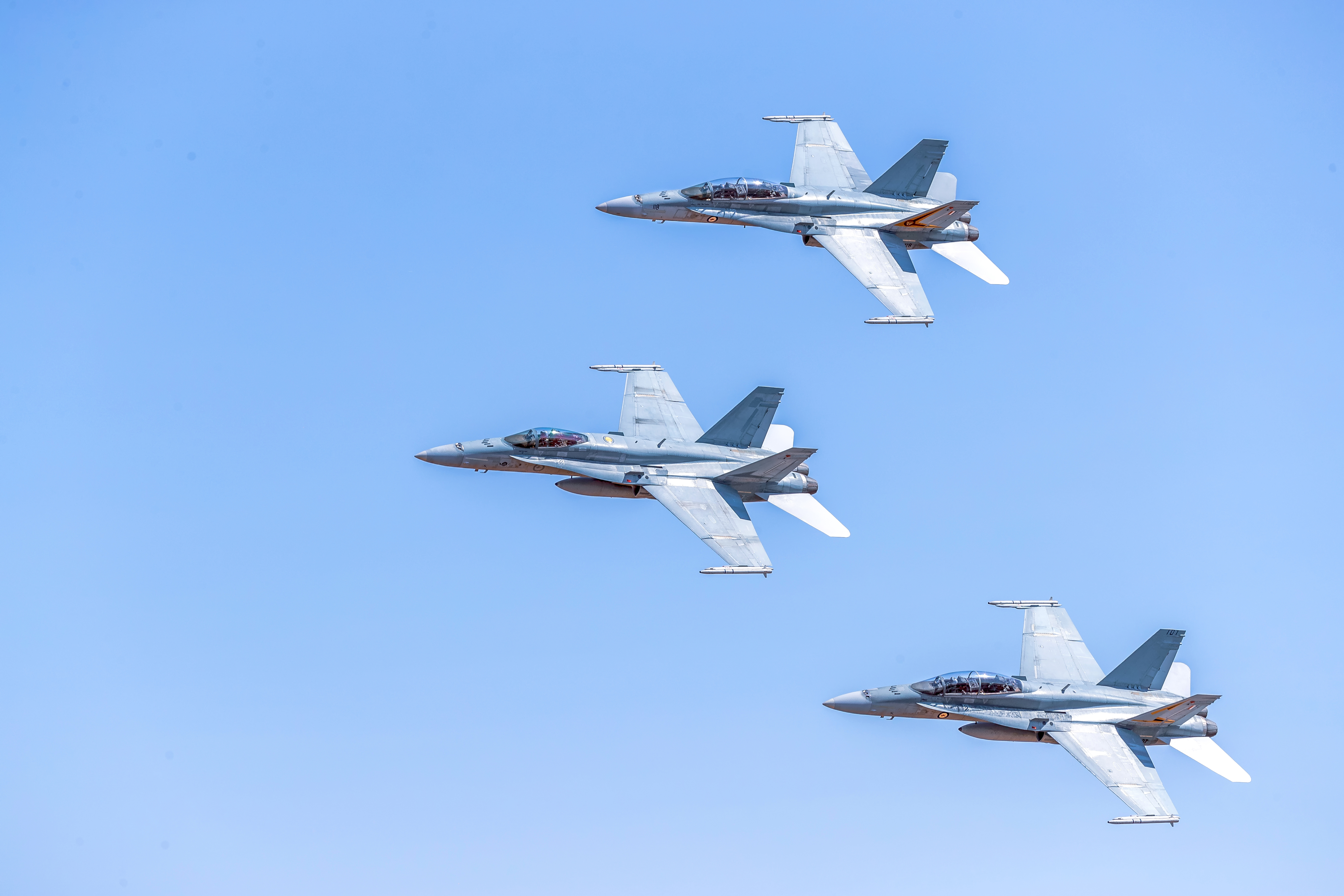
RAAF F/A-18A Hornet and F/A-18B Hornets fly in formation, 2019

During the Vietnam War, from 1964 to 1972, the RAAF contributed Caribou STOL transport aircraft as part of the RAAF Transport Flight Vietnam, later redesignated No. 35 Squadron RAAF, UH-1 Iroquois helicopters from No. 9 Squadron RAAF, and English Electric Canberra bombers from No. 2 Squadron RAAF. The Canberras flew 11,963 bombing sorties, and two aircraft were lost. One went missing during a bombing raid. The wreckage of the aircraft was recovered in April 2009, and the remains of the crew were found in late July 2009. The other was shot down by a surface-to-air missile, although both crew were rescued. They dropped 76,389 bombs and were credited with 786 enemy personnel confirmed killed and a further 3,390 estimated killed, 8,637 structures, 15,568 bunkers, 1,267 sampans and 74 bridges destroyed. RAAF transport aircraft also supported anti-communist ground forces. The UH-1 helicopters were used in many roles including medical evacuation and close air support. RAAF casualties in Vietnam included six killed in action, eight non-battle fatalities, 30 wounded in action and 30 injured. A small number of RAAF pilots also served in United States Air Force units, flying F-4 Phantom fighter-bombers or serving as forward air controllers.

In September 1975, a group of 44 civilians, including armed supporters of the Timorese Democratic Union (UDT), commandeered an RAAF Caribou, A4-140, on the ground at Baucau Airport in the then Portuguese Timor, which was in the middle of a civil war. The Caribou had landed at Baucau on a humanitarian mission for the International Committee of the Red Cross. The civilians demanded that the RAAF crew members fly them to Darwin Airport (also RAAF Base Darwin) in Australia, which they did. After the Caribou arrived there, the Australian government detained the civilians for a short period, and then granted refugee visas to all of them. The Guardian later described A4-140 as "the only RAAF plane ever hijacked", and the incident as "one of the more remarkable stories in Australia's military and immigration history".

=== Recent history (1990–present) ===
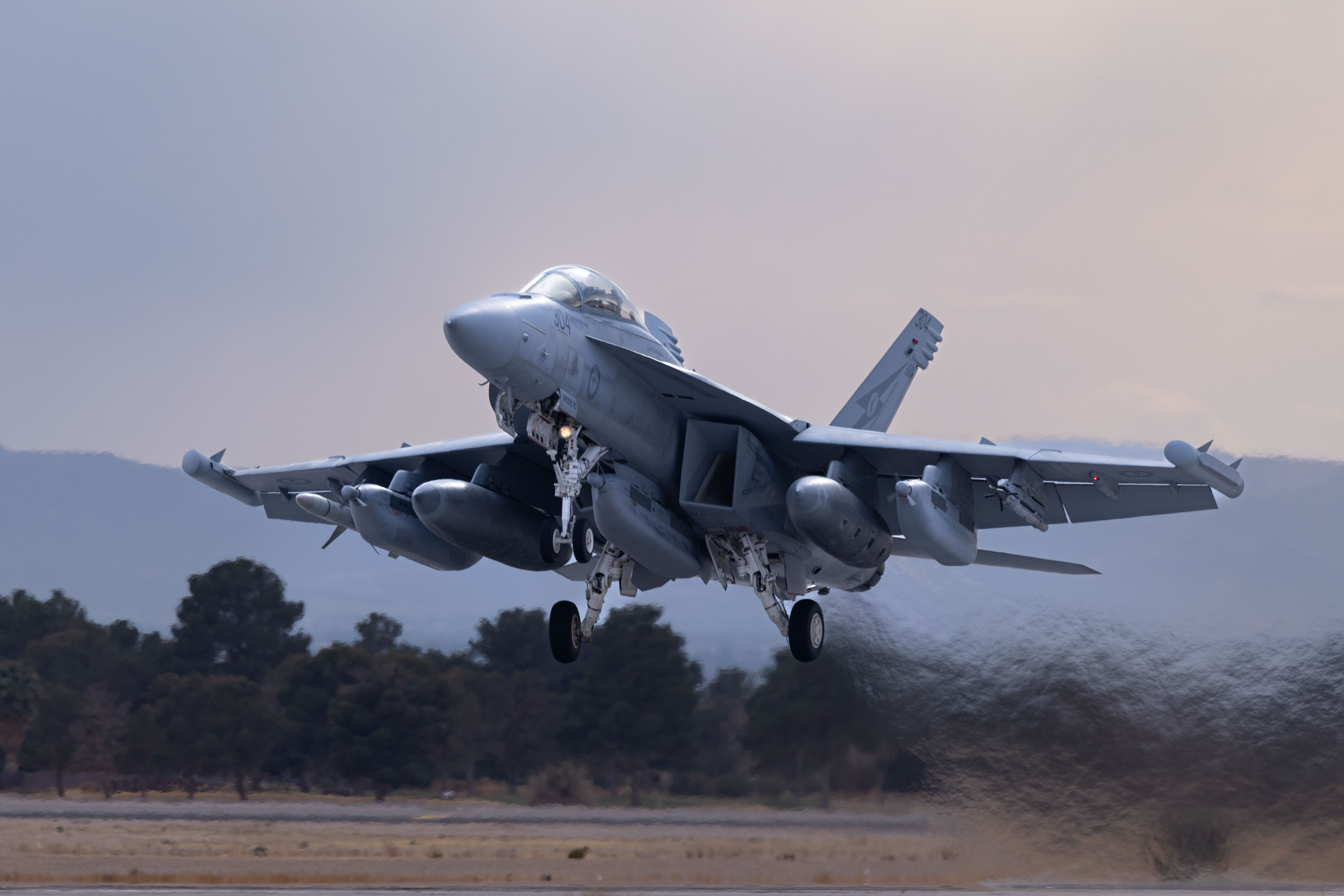
RAAF EA-18G Growler during the 2025 Red Flag exercise

Military airlifts were conducted for a number of purposes in subsequent decades, such as the peacekeeping operations in East Timor from 1999. Australia's combat aircraft were not used again in combat until the Iraq War in 2003, when 14 F/A-18s from No. 75 Squadron RAAF operated in the escort and ground attack roles, flying a total of 350 sorties and dropping 122 laser-guided bombs. A detachment of AP-3C Orion maritime patrol aircraft were deployed in the Middle East between 2003 and 2012. These aircraft conducted maritime surveillance patrols over the Persian Gulf and North Arabian Sea in support of Coalition warships and boarding parties, as well as conducting extensive overland flights of Iraq and Afghanistan on intelligence, surveillance and reconnaissance missions, and supporting counter-piracy operations in Somalia. From 2007 to 2009, a detachment of No. 114 Mobile Control and Reporting Unit RAAF was on active service at Kandahar Airfield in southern Afghanistan. Approximately 75 personnel deployed with the AN/TPS-77 radar assigned the responsibility to co-ordinate coalition air operations. A detachment of IAI Heron unmanned aerial vehicles was deployed in Afghanistan from January 2010 until November 2014.

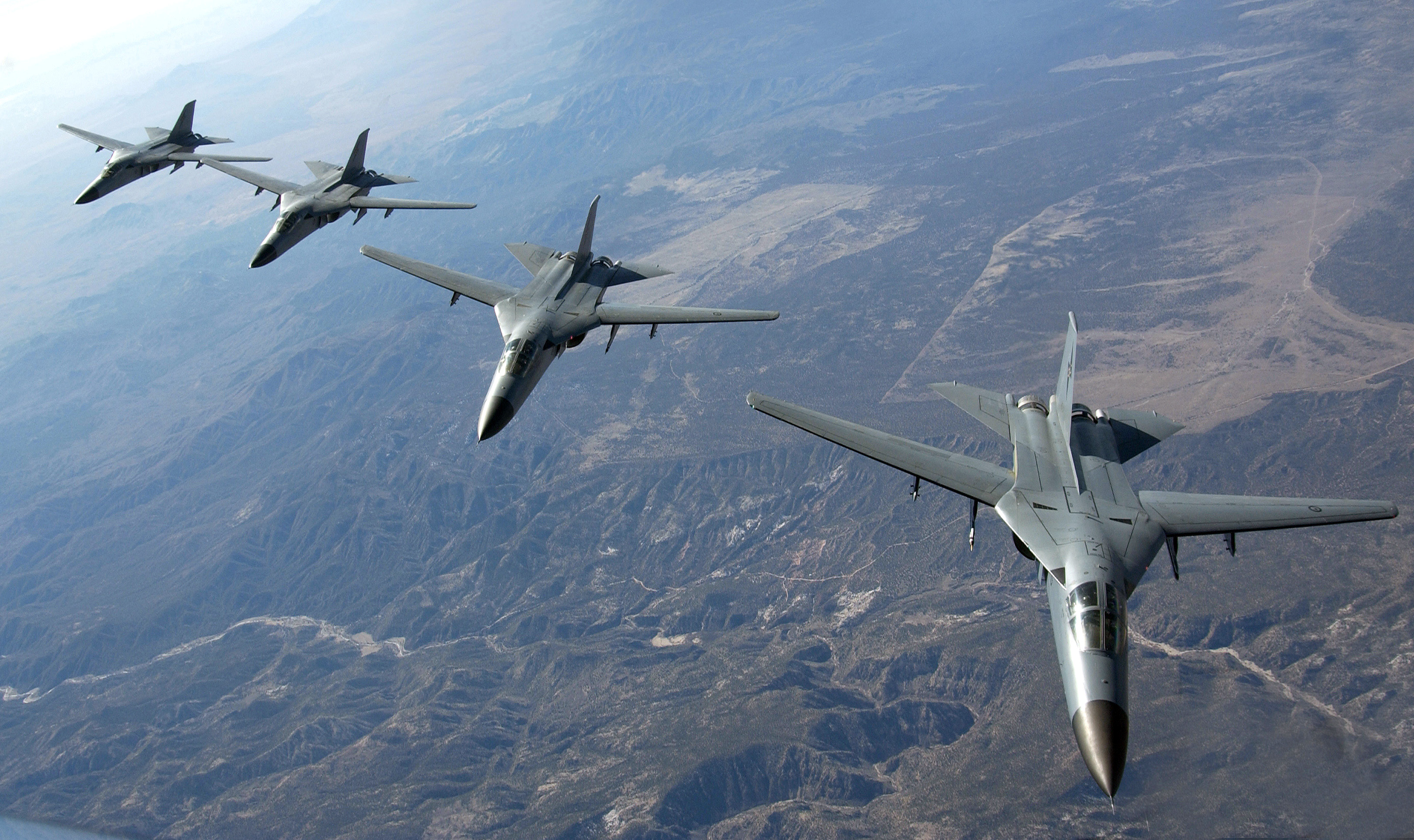
Royal Australian Air Force F-111s fly toward Nellis Air Force Base in 2006 after a refueling exercise during Red Flag training

In late September 2014, an Air Task Group consisting of up to eight F/A-18F Super Hornets, a KC-30A Multi Role Tanker Transport, an E-7A Wedgetail Airborne Early Warning & Control aircraft and 400 personnel was deployed to Al Minhad Air Base in the United Arab Emirates as part of the coalition to combat Islamic State forces in Iraq. Operations began on 1 October. A number of C-17 and C-130J Super Hercules transport aircraft based in the Middle East have also been used to conduct airdrops of humanitarian aid and to airlift arms and munitions since August. In June 2017, two RAAF AP-3C Orion maritime patrol aircraft were deployed to the southern Philippines in response to the Marawi crisis.

In 2021, the Royal Australian Air Force commemorated its 100th anniversary. Later that year, on 29 November, the Hornet was officially retired from RAAF service, with a ceremony to mark the occasion taking place that day at RAAF Base Williamtown.

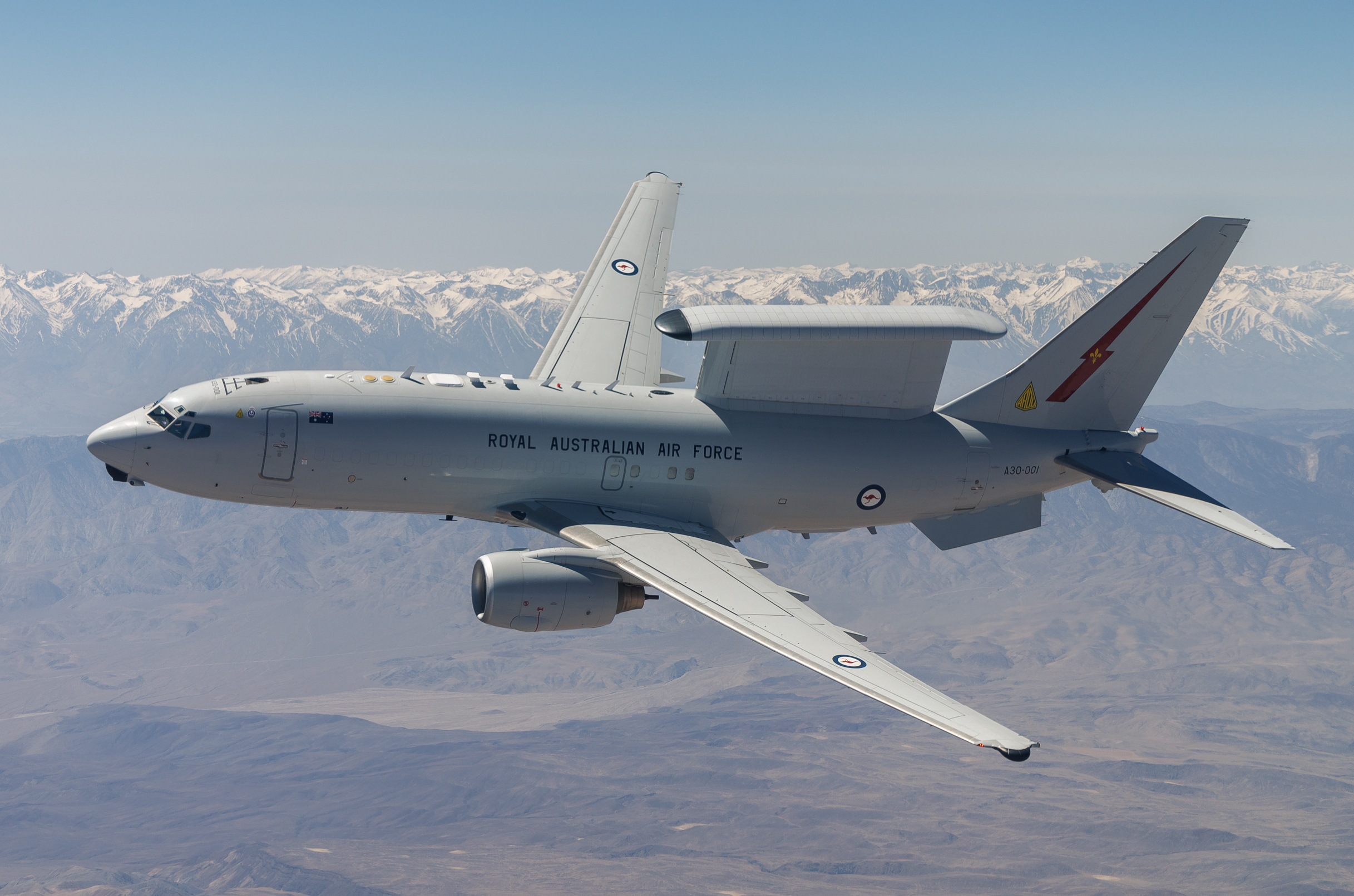
E-7A Wedgetail in 2025

In January 2022, two RAAF P-8A Poseidon maritime patrol aircraft and one C-130J Hercules departed RAAF Amberley and Richmond to conduct aerial reconnaissance of Tonga in the wake of the 2022 Hunga Tonga–Hunga Ha'apai eruption and tsunami. According to Australian Defence News, the flights were to "help determine the extent of the damage [to Tongan infrastructure]… and inform future disaster support requests."

In October 2023, the Australian Government announced that, in addition to a further round of A$31.6 million for military assistance for Ukraine, it would be sending a single E-7A Wedgetail. This aircraft, and the associated 100 personnel - mainly from 2 Squadron, would operate from Ramstein Air Base for a six month deployment under Operation Kudu. The stated objective of the deployment was to "help ensure that vital support flowing to Ukraine by the international community is protected."

== Structure ==
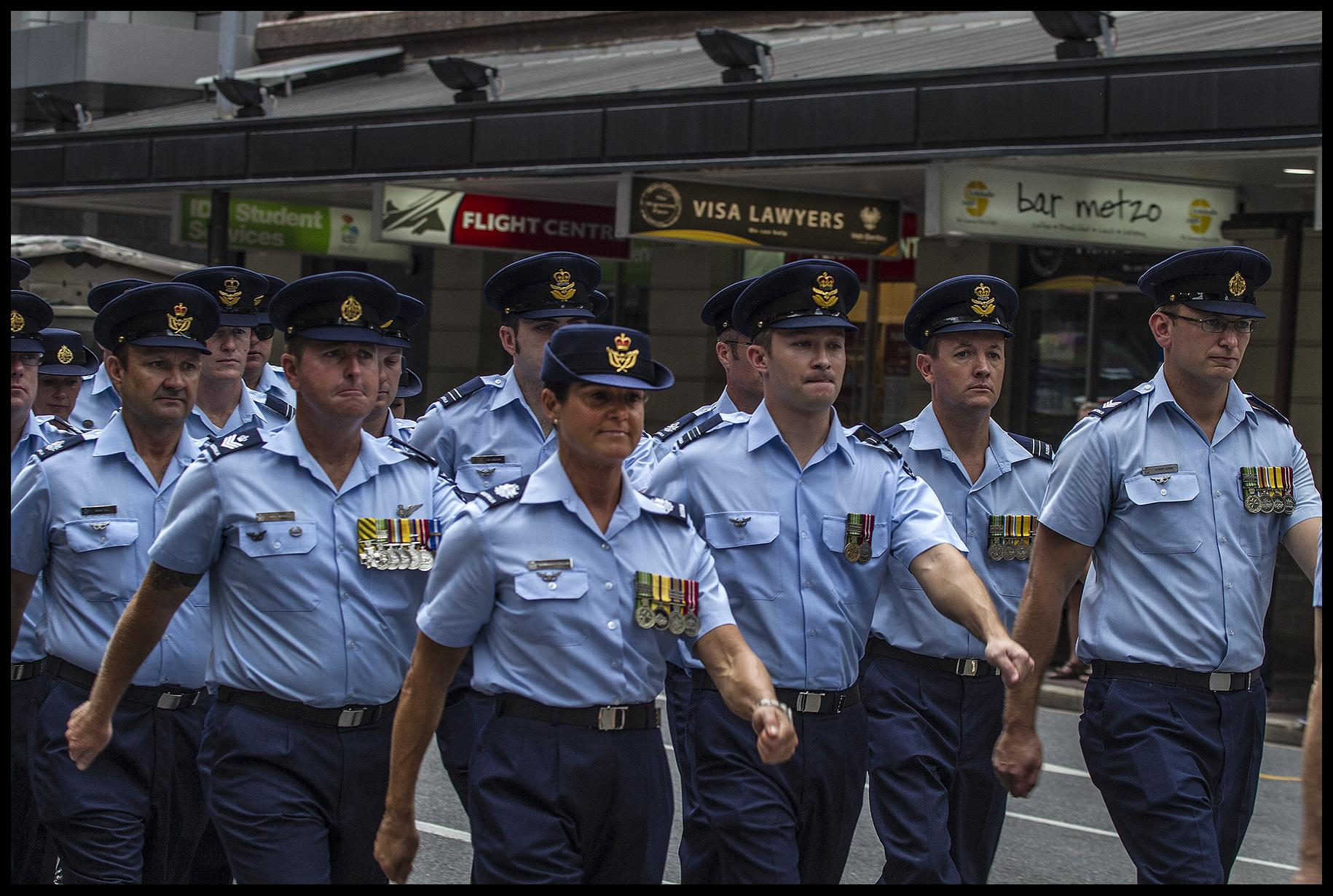
RAAF personnel on parade in Brisbane in honor of Operation Slipper, 2015

=== Headquarters ===
- Air Force Headquarters RAAF – Air Force Executive
- RAAF Air Command – Air Force Combat Forces
- Defence Space Command – tri-service integrated headquarters for space operations

=== Force Element Groups ===
- Air Combat Group – air combat capability
- Air Mobility Group – air lift and aerial refuelling capability
- Air Warfare Centre – information warfare, intelligence and capability development
- Combat Support Group – combat support and air base operations capability
- Surveillance and Response Group – surveillance and reconnaissance capability
- Air Force Training Group – air force training capability and development

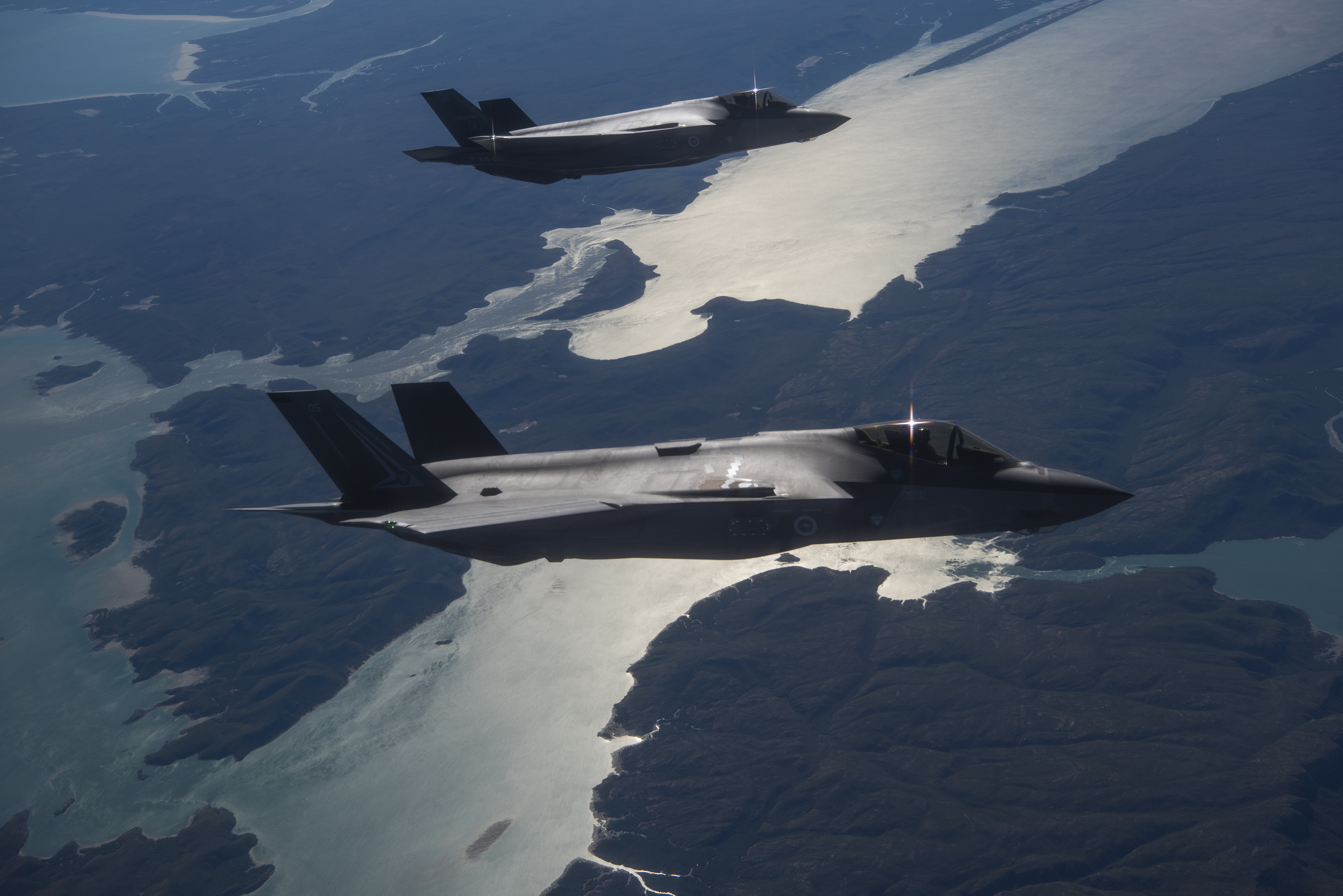
F-35A Lightning IIs from No. 3 Squadron in 2023

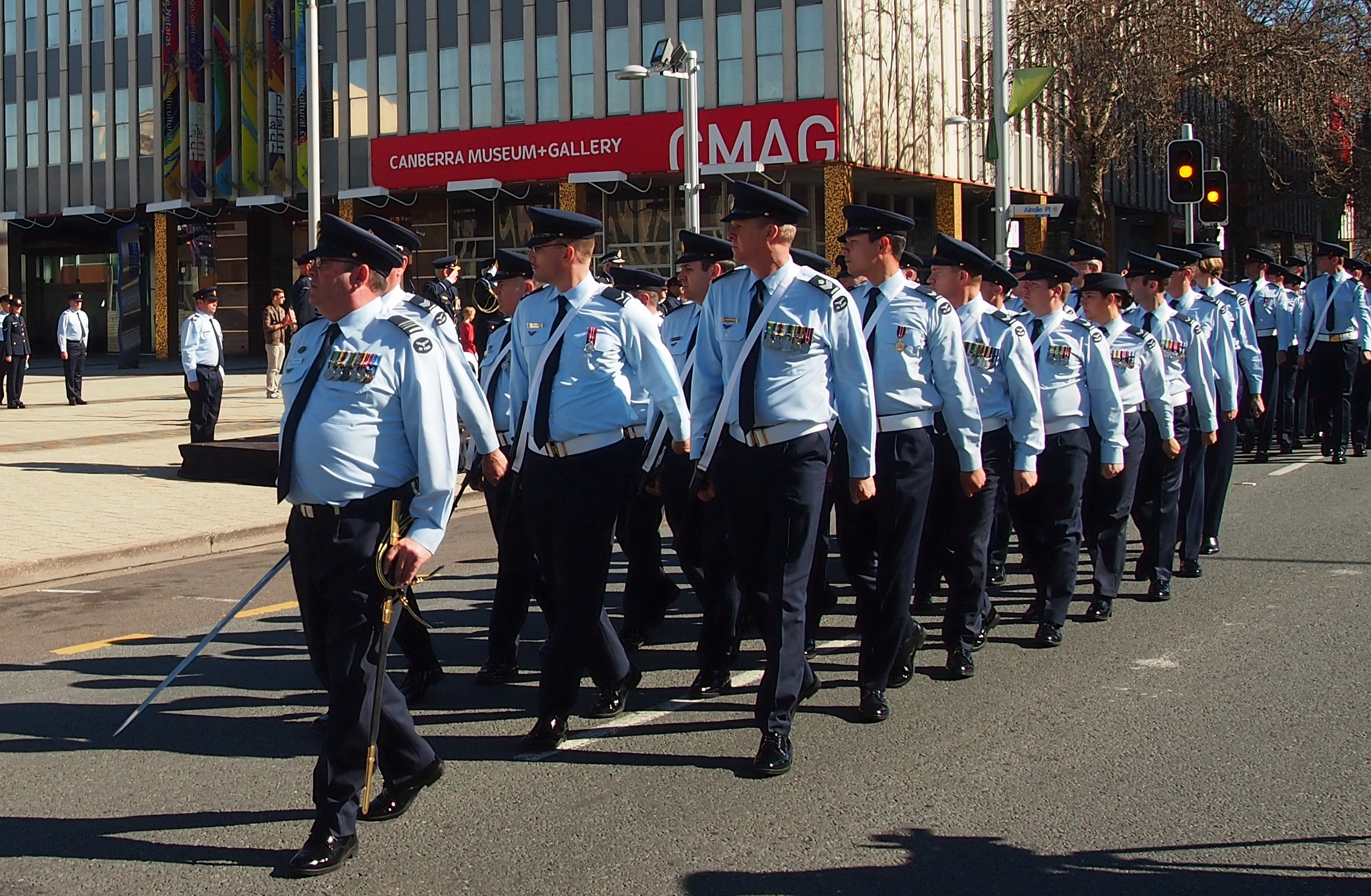
Members of No. 28 Squadron on parade in Canberra, 2013

=== Wings and squadrons ===
==== Flying squadrons ====
List of flying squadrons:

- No. 1 Squadron – Boeing F/A-18F Super Hornet (Multi-Role Fighter)
- No. 2 Squadron – Boeing E-7A Wedgetail (AEW&C)
- No. 3 Squadron – Lockheed Martin F-35A Lightning II (Multi-Role Fighter)
- No. 4 Squadron – Pilatus PC-21(F) (JTAC Training)
- No. 6 Squadron – Boeing EA-18G Growler (Electronic Warfare)
- No. 9 Squadron – Northrop Grumman MQ-4C Triton (Maritime Patrol)
- No. 10 Squadron – MC-55A Peregrine (SIGINT and ELINT)
- No. 11 Squadron – Boeing P-8A Poseidon (Maritime Patrol)
- No. 12 Squadron – Boeing P-8A Poseidon (Maritime Patrol)
- No. 32 Squadron – Beechcraft King Air 350 (School of Air Warfare Support)
- No. 33 Squadron – Airbus KC-30A MRTT (Air Refuelling/Transport)
- No. 34 Squadron – Boeing 737 MAX 8 BBJ, Dassault Falcon 7X (VIP Transport)
- No. 35 Squadron – Alenia C-27J Spartan (Transport)
- No. 36 Squadron – Boeing C-17A Globemaster III (Transport)
- No. 37 Squadron – Lockheed C-130J-30 Super Hercules (Transport)
- No. 75 Squadron – Lockheed Martin F-35A Lightning II (Multi-Role Fighter)
- No. 76 Squadron – BAE Systems Hawk 127 (Lead-in Fighter Training/ADF Support)
- No. 77 Squadron – Lockheed Martin F-35A Lightning II (Multi-Role Fighter)
- No. 79 Squadron – BAE Systems Hawk 127 (Introductory Fast Jet Training/ADF Support)
- No. 100 Squadron – Historic aircraft (Air Force Heritage Squadron)
- No. 292 Squadron – Boeing P-8A Poseidon (Operational Conversion)
- CFS – Pilatus PC-21 (Flying Instructor Training)
- No. 1 FTS – Pilatus PC-21 (Basic Tri-Service Flying Training)
- No. 2 FTS – Pilatus PC-21 (Advanced RAAF and RAN Flying Training)
- No. 2 OCU – Lockheed Martin F-35A Lightning II (Operational Conversion)
- ARDU – Various aircraft types (Flight Testing)

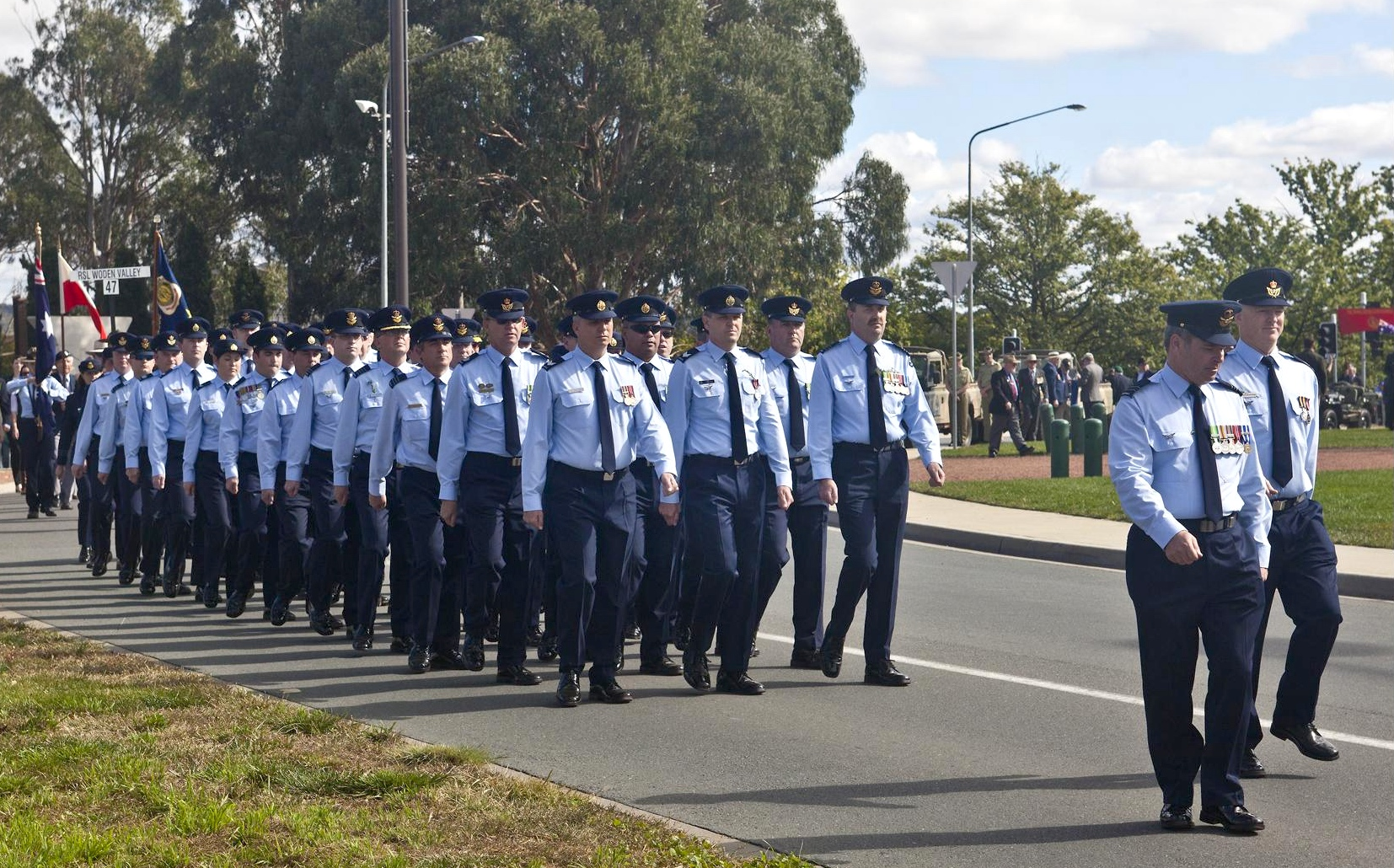
RAAF personnel in the 2011 Canberra ANZAC Day parade

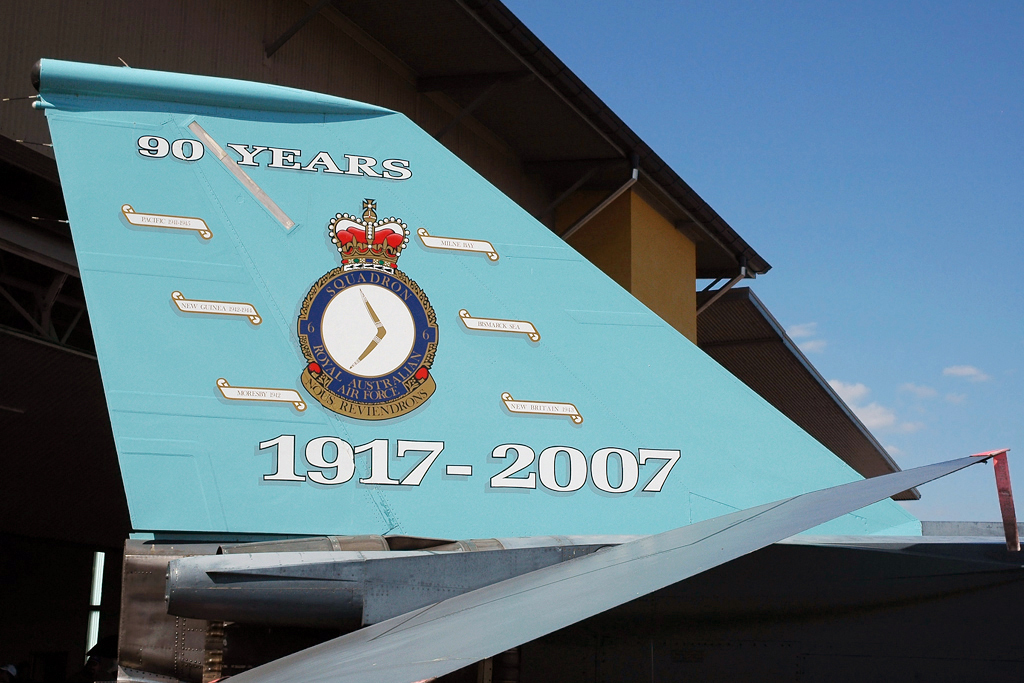
Example of a squadron crest on an F-111G Aardvark from No. 6 Squadron in 2008

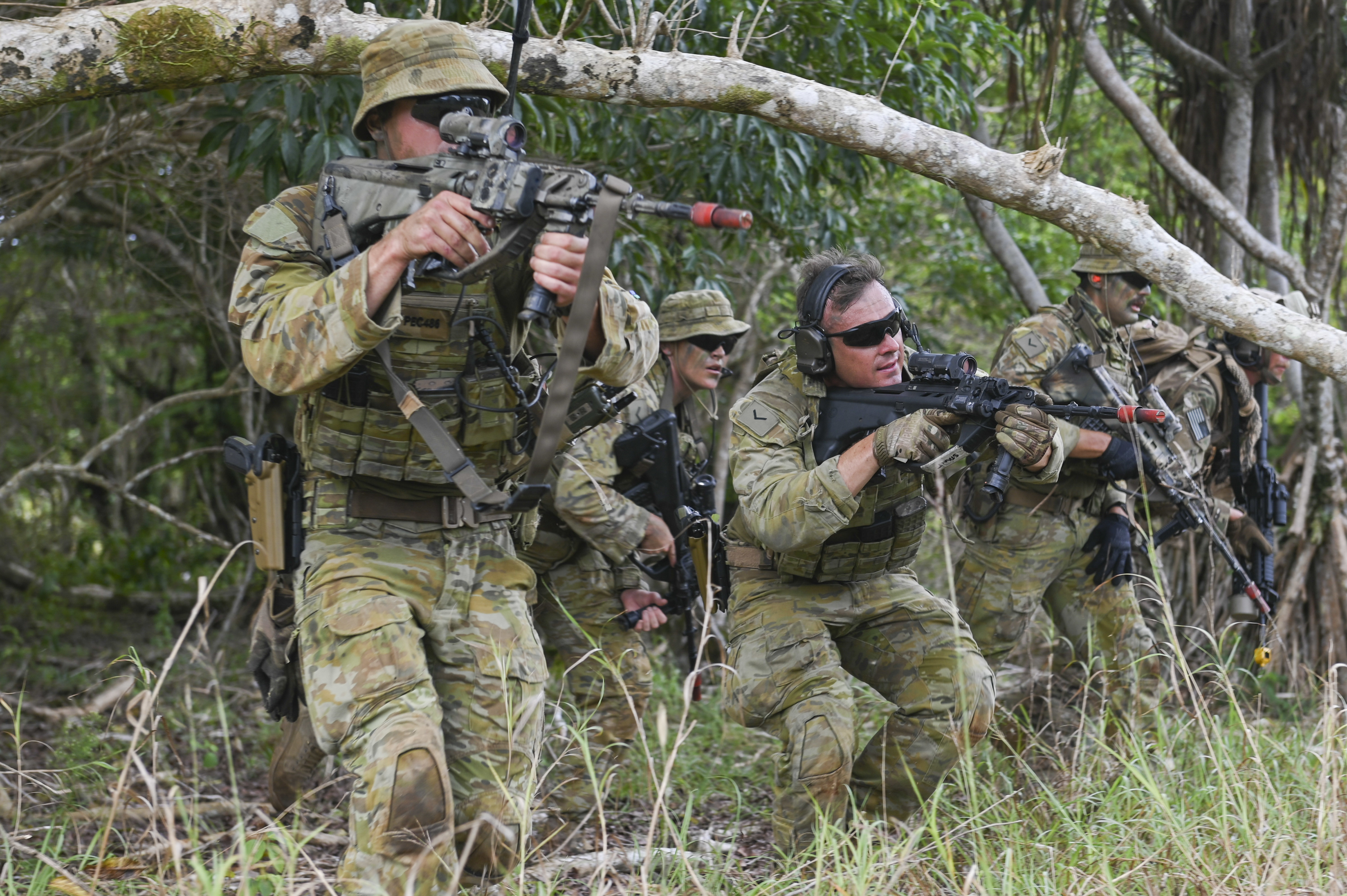
No. 2 Security Forces Squadron demonstrates a combat scenario in Guam, 2022

==== Non-flying squadrons ====
List of non-flying squadrons:

- No. 1 SECFOR SQN – Airbase Force Protection
- No. 1 EHS – Health Operations
- No. 1 CCS – Combat Communications
- No. 1 RSU – Wide Area Surveillance
- No. 1 RTU – Airman Ab Initio Training
- No. 2 SECFOR SQN – Airbase Force Protection
- No. 2 EHS – Health Operations
- No. 3 EHS – Health Operations
- No. 3 CRU – Surveillance and Air Battle Management
- No. 3 SECFOR SQN – Airbase Force Protection
- No. 4 EHS – Health Operations
- No. 13 Squadron – RAAF Darwin Airbase Operations
- No. 17 Squadron – RAAF Tindal Airbase Operations
- No. 19 Squadron – RMAF Butterworth Airbase Operations
- No. 20 Squadron – RAAF Woomera Airbase Operations
- No. 21 Squadron – RAAF Williams Airbase Operations
- No. 22 Squadron – RAAF Richmond Airbase Operations
- No. 23 Squadron – RAAF Amberley Airbase Operations
- No. 24 Squadron – RAAF Edinburgh Airbase Operations
- No. 25 Squadron – RAAF Pearce Airbase Operations
- No. 26 Squadron – RAAF Williamtown Airbase Operations
- No. 27 Squadron – RAAF Townsville Airbase Operations
- No. 28 Squadron – Administrative Support Operations
- No. 29 Squadron – Administrative Support Operations
- No. 30 Squadron – RAAF East Sale Airbase Operations
- No. 31 Squadron – RAAF Wagga Airbase Operations
- No. 65 Squadron – Airfield Engineering and Explosive Ordnance Disposal (EOD)
- No. 87 Squadron – Intelligence Operations
- No. 114 MCRU – Deployable Surveillance, Air Battle Management and Air Traffic Control
- No. 278 Squadron – Operational Training
- No. 381 SQN – Contingency Response Squadron
- No. 382 SQN – Contingency Response Squadron
- No. 452 Squadron – Air Traffic Control
- No. 453 Squadron – Air Traffic Control
- No. 460 Squadron – Intelligence Operations
- No. 462 Squadron – Information Warfare Operations
- ASCENG SQN – Aircraft/Stores Compatibility Engineering Development
- AMTDU – Air Movements Training and Development
- ASES – Aircraft Systems Engineering Development
- CSTS – Combat Survival Training
- RAAF AIS – Aeronautical Information
- RAAF BAND – RAAF Ceremonial Band
- DEOTS – Explosive Ordnance Training
- AVMED – Aviation Medicine Research and Development
- JEWOSU – Electronic Warfare Operations and Development
- OTS – Officer Ab Initio Training
- RAAF Museum – Royal Australian Air Force Museum
- RAAF SFS – Security and Fire Training
- SAW – Air Combat Officer and Observer Training
- RAAFSALT – Administrative and Logistics Training
- RAAFSATC – Air Traffic Control Training
- RAAFSPS – Officer and Airman Post Graduate Professional Training
- RAAFSTT – Air Technical Training
- SACTU – Air Defence Training
- Woomera Test Facility – Augmented Testing Range

==== Wings ====
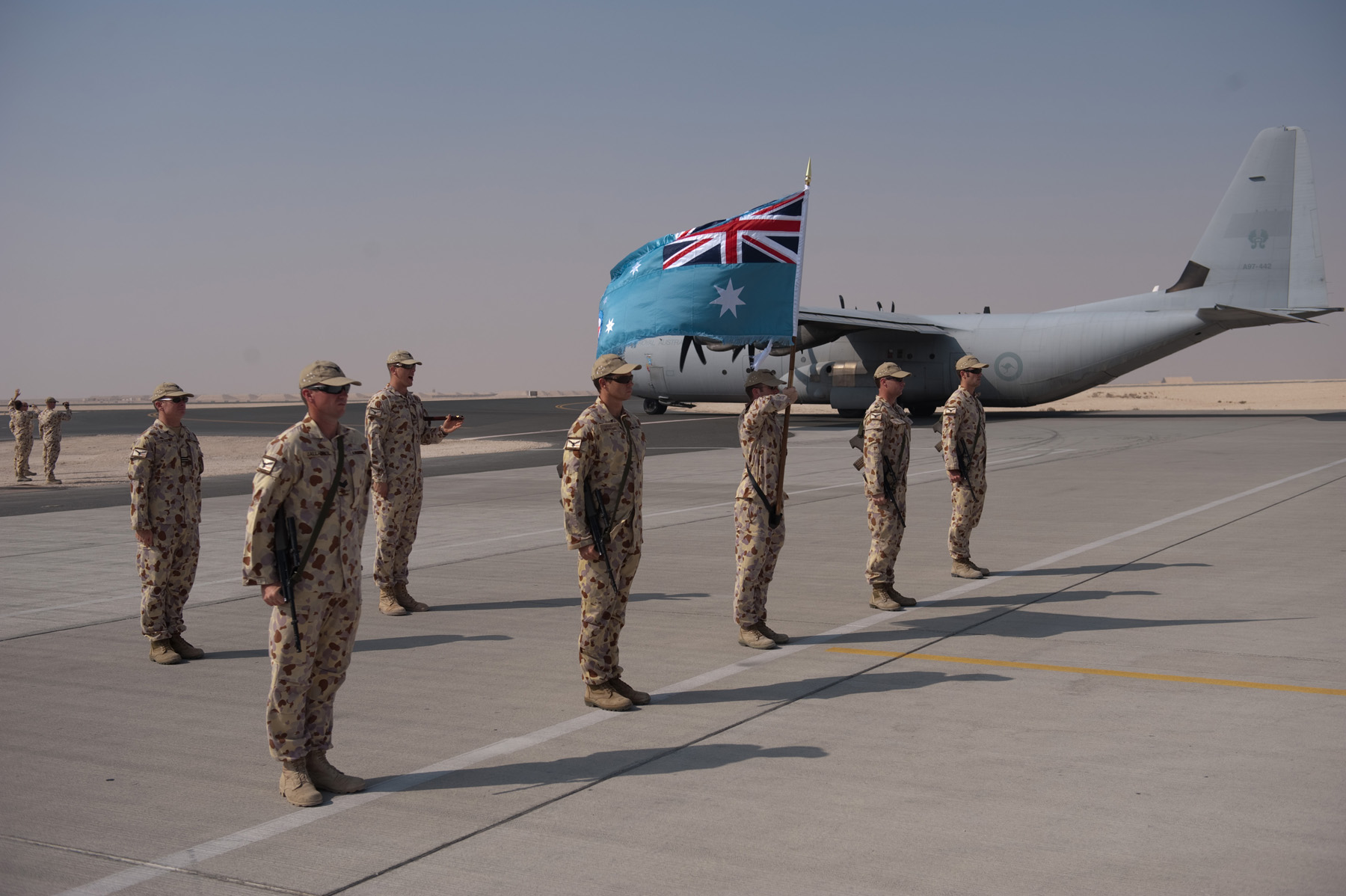
An honor guard from No. 37 Squadron with a C-130J Hercules in 2009

List of current wings:

- No. 41 Wing (Surveillance & Air Battle Management)
- No. 44 Wing (ATC)
- No. 78 Wing (Lead-in Fighter Training)
- No. 81 Wing (Multi-Role Fighter)
- No. 82 Wing (Multi-Role Fighter)
- No. 84 Wing (Airlift & VIP transport)
- No. 86 Wing (Airlift & AAR)
- No. 92 Wing (Maritime Patrol)
- No. 95 Wing (Expeditionary Combat Support)
- No. 96 Wing (Fixed Base Combat Support)
- Air Mobility Control Centre – central combat airlift tasking control centre
- AirA – Air Academy – Aviation Training (Pilots, Air Traffic Control etc.)
- GA – Ground Academy – Ab initio, ground technical and non-technical training, career development, promotion and leadership training
- DTWG – Aerospace Systems Development
- CSCC – Combat Support Coordination
- HSW – Health Operations
- IWD – Information Warfare and Intelligence

== Equipment ==
=== Aircraft ===
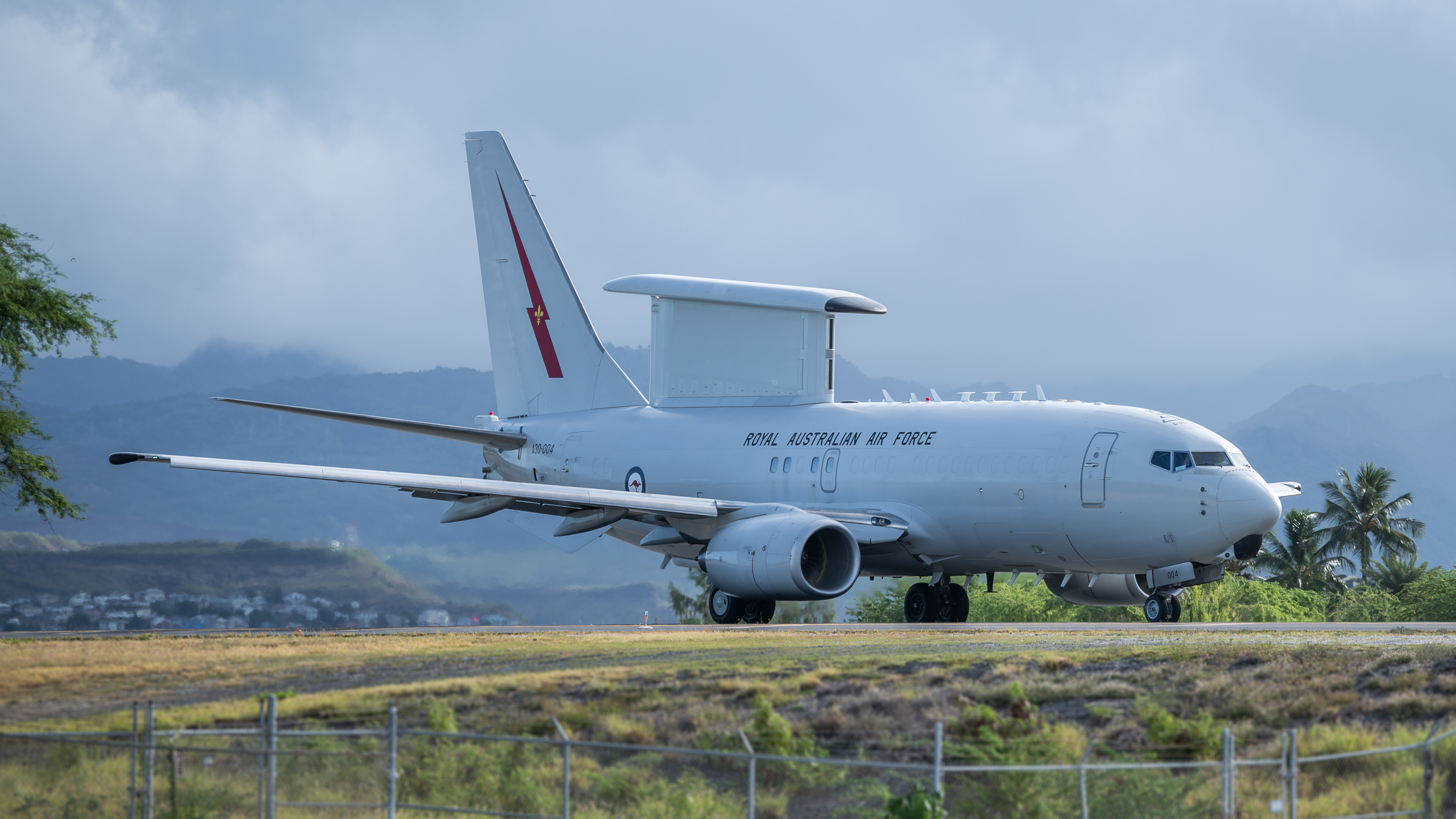
E-7A Wedgetail in 2019

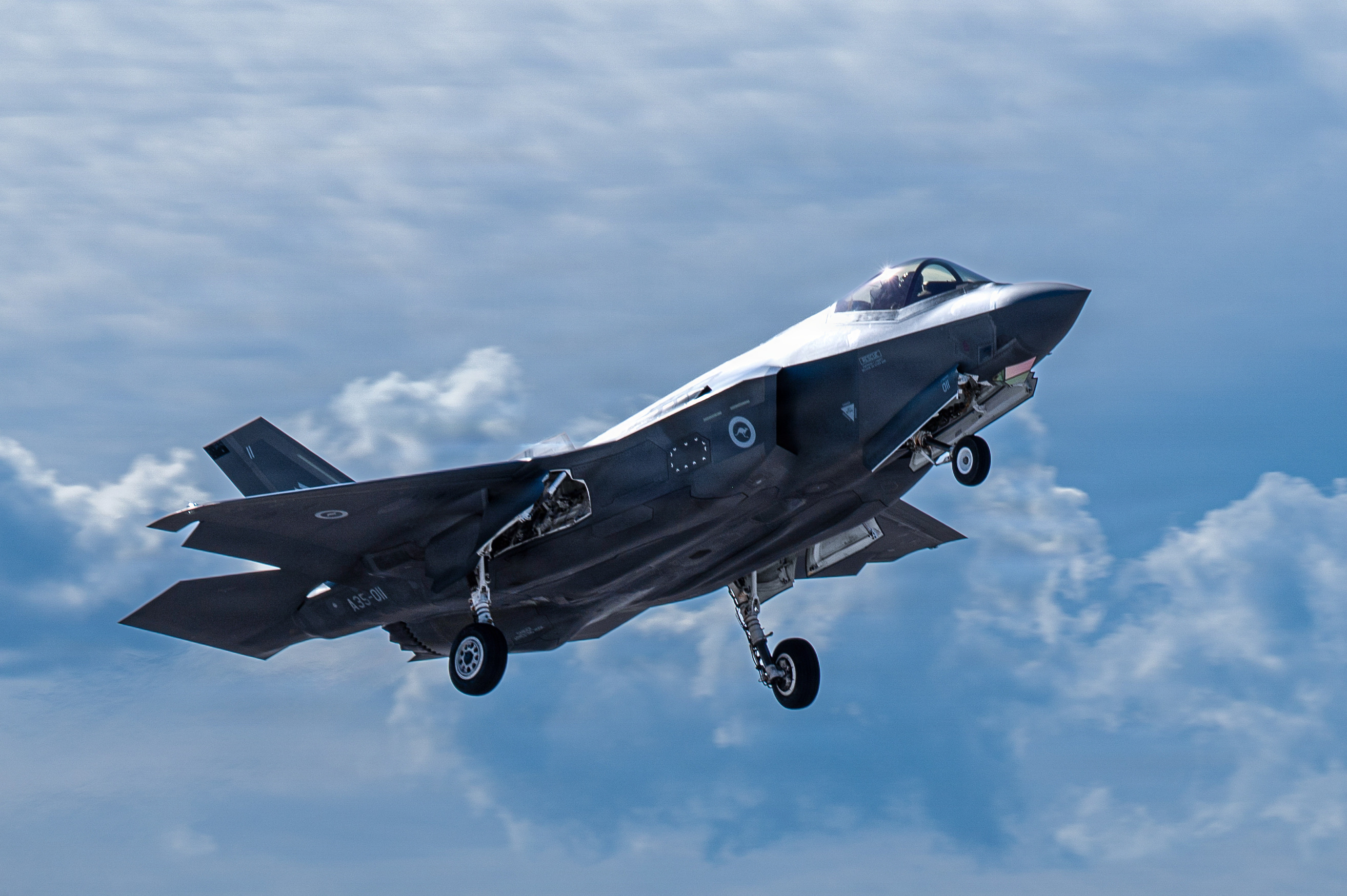
F-35A Lightning II in 2026

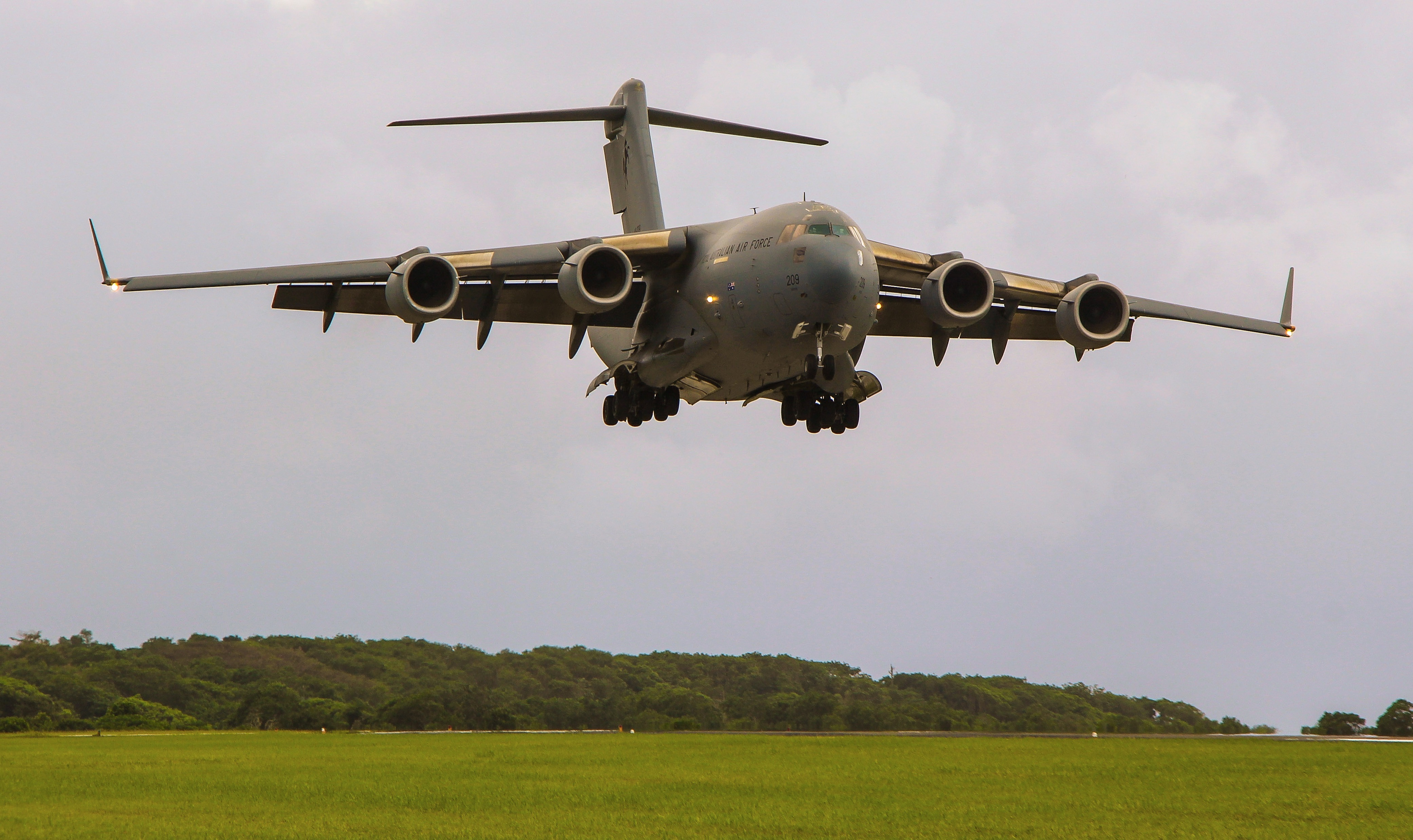
C-17 Globemaster III at Christmas Island Airport in 2016

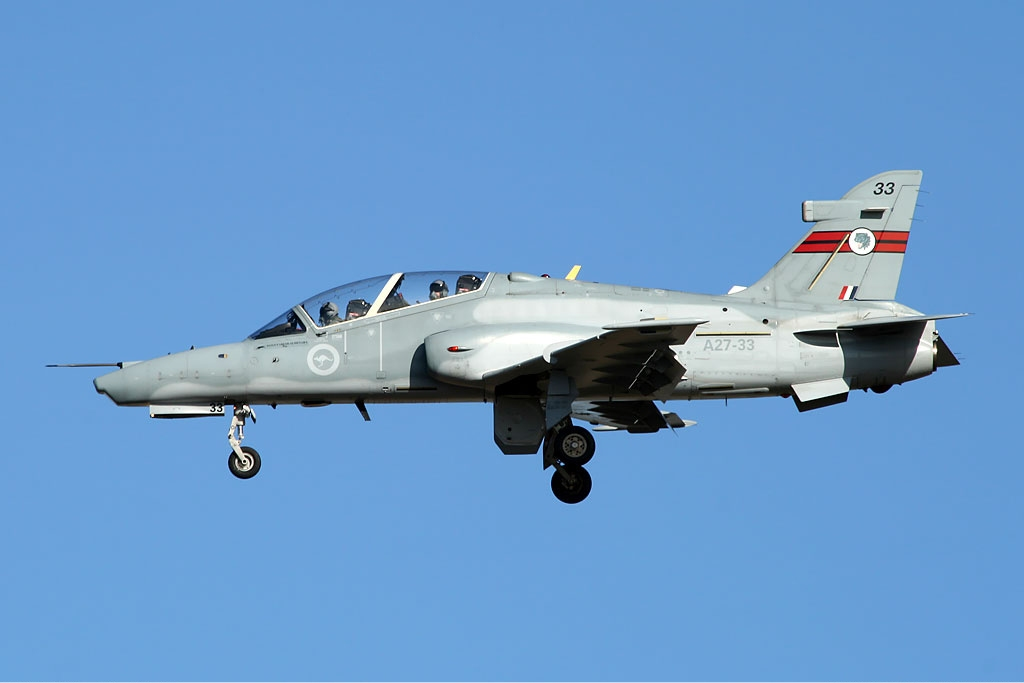
BAE Hawk on approach

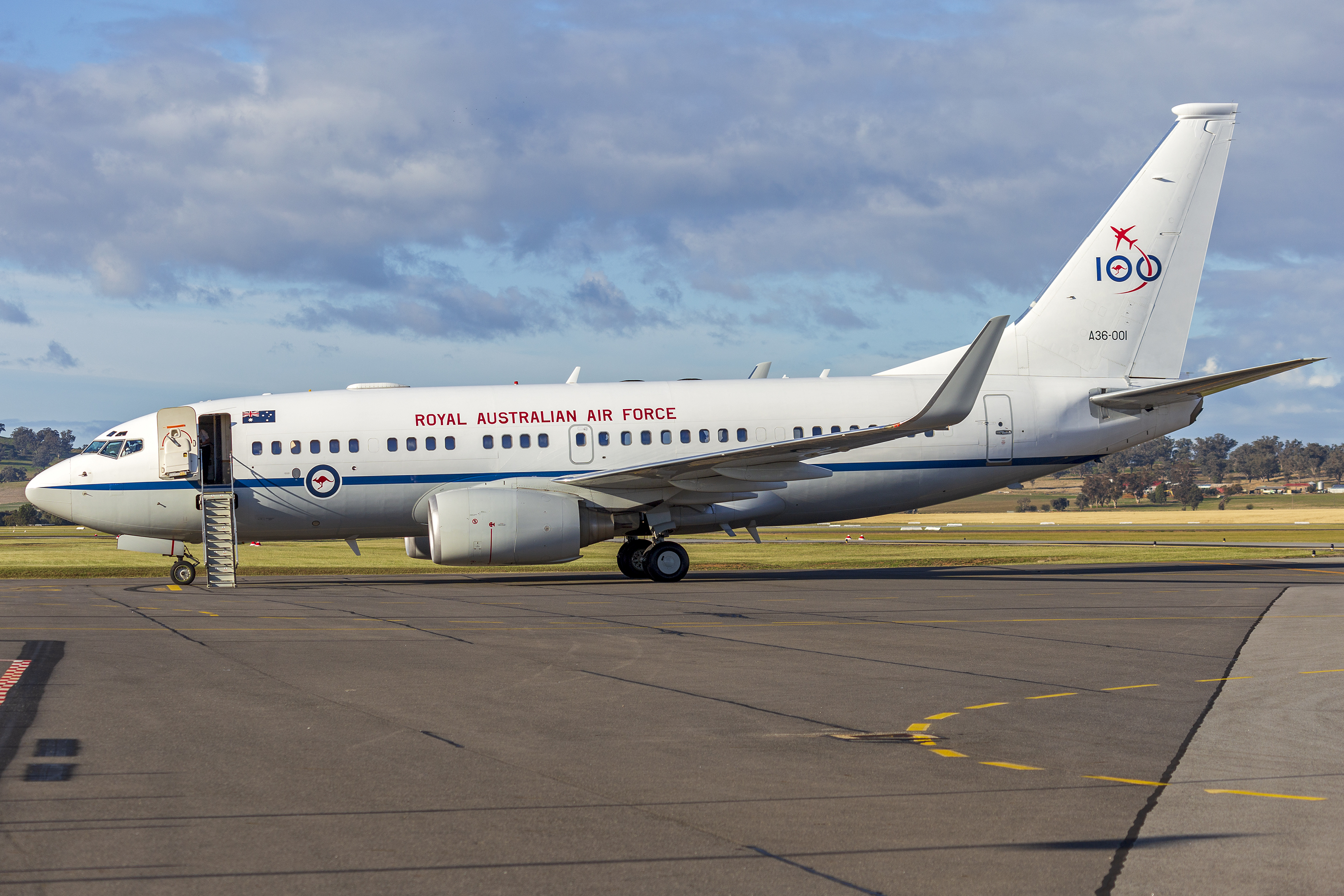
Boeing 737-7DT (BBJ) at Wagga Wagga Airport in 2021

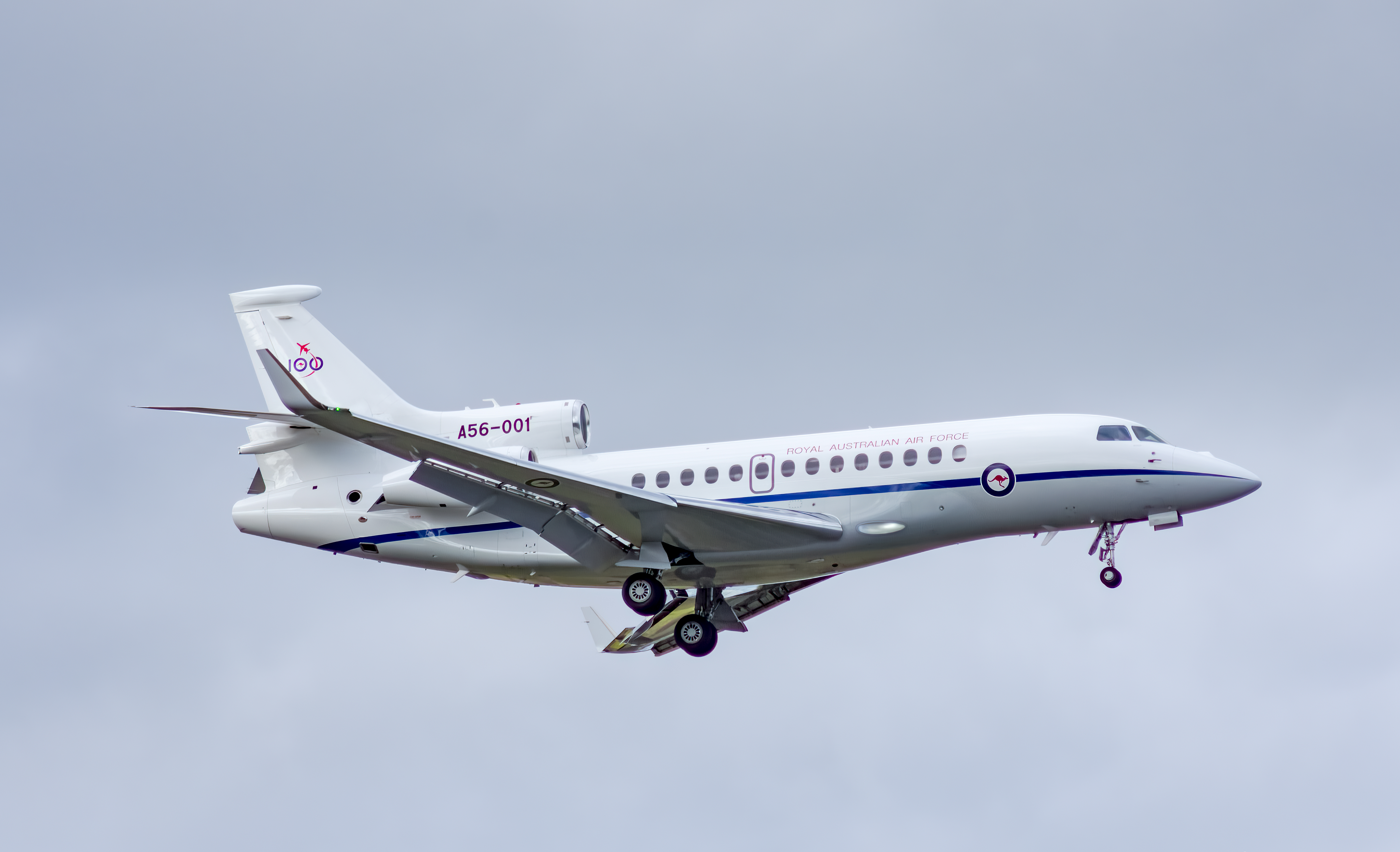
Dassault Falcon 7X at Melbourne Airport in 2022

Aircraft	Origin	Type	Variant	In service	Notes
Combat aircraft
Boeing F/A-18E/F Super Hornet	United States	Multirole	F/A-18F	24	
Lockheed Martin F-35 Lightning II	United States	Stealth multirole	F-35A	72	
AWACS
Boeing E-7 Wedgetail	United States / Australia	AEW&C	E-7A	6	
Electronic warfare
Boeing EA-18G Growler	United States	Radar jamming / SEAD		12	
Gulfstream G550	United States	SIGINT / ELINT	MC-55A	4	
Maritime patrol
Boeing P-8A Poseidon	United States	ASW / Patrol		14	
Tanker
Airbus A330 MRTT	France	Refueling / Transport	KC-30A	7	1 VIP configured
Transport
Boeing 737	United States	VIP transport	MAX 8 BBJ	2	
Boeing C-17 Globemaster III	United States	Strategic airlifter	C-17A	8	
Alenia C-27J Spartan	Italy	Utility transport		10	To be retired
Beechcraft Super King Air	United States	Utility / Transport	KA350	8	3 used for ISTAR mission
Dassault Falcon 7X	France	VIP transport		3	
Lockheed Martin C-130J Super Hercules	United States	Tactical airlifter	C-130J-30	12	20 replacement C-130J on order
Trainer aircraft
Pilatus PC-21	Switzerland	Primary Trainer		49	
BAE Hawk	United Kingdom	Fast Jet trainer	Hawk 127	33	Flown out of 76SQN and 79SQN
Beechcraft Super King Air	United States	Multi-engine trainer	KA350	4	
UAVs
MQ-4C Triton	United States	HALE maritime ISR		3	1 on order.
MQ-28A Ghost Bat	Australia	UCAV	Block 1 Block 2	17	8 Block 1, 9 Block 2. Block 3 in production

=== Armament ===
Paveway II laser-guided bomb

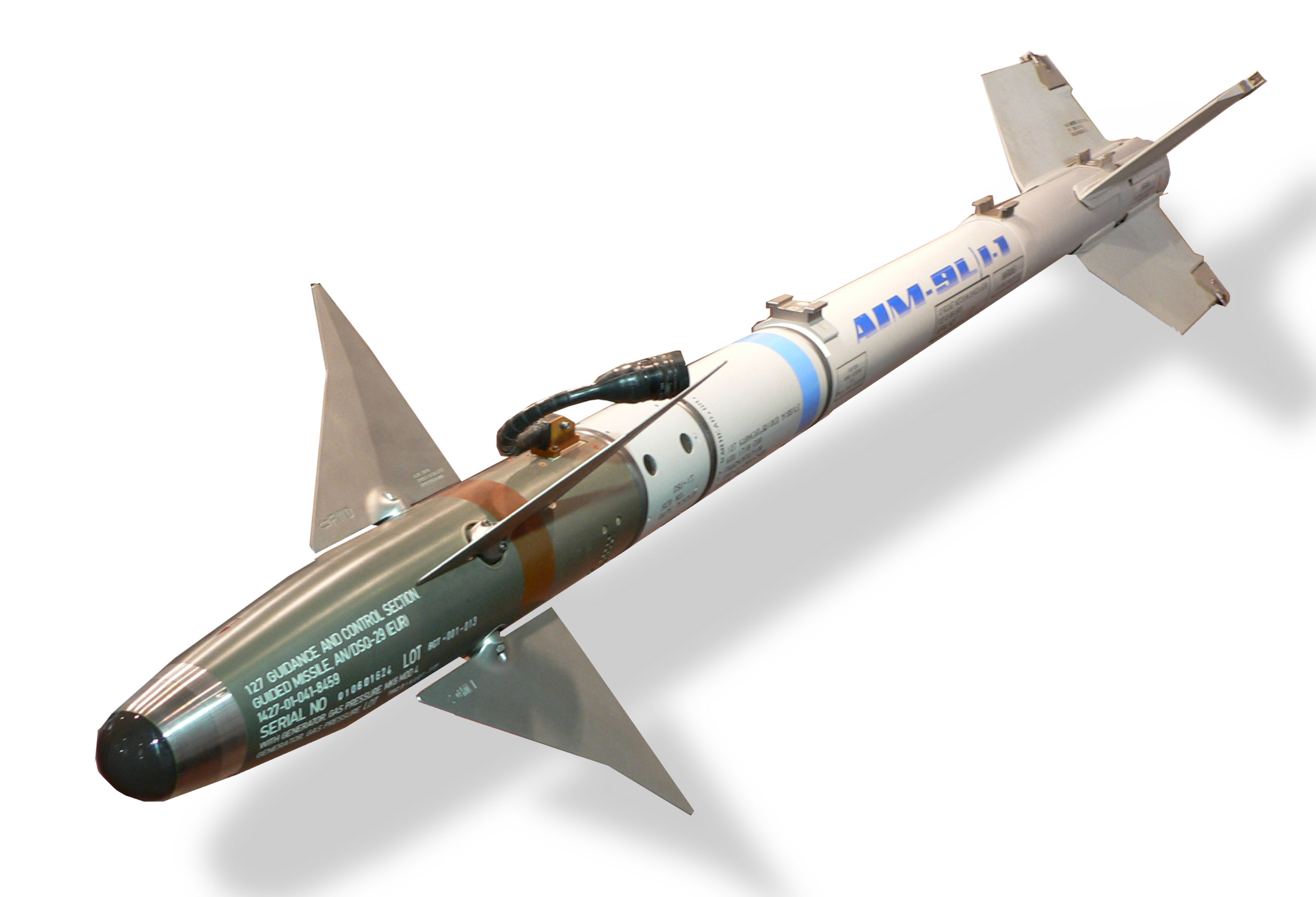
AIM-9L Sidewinder

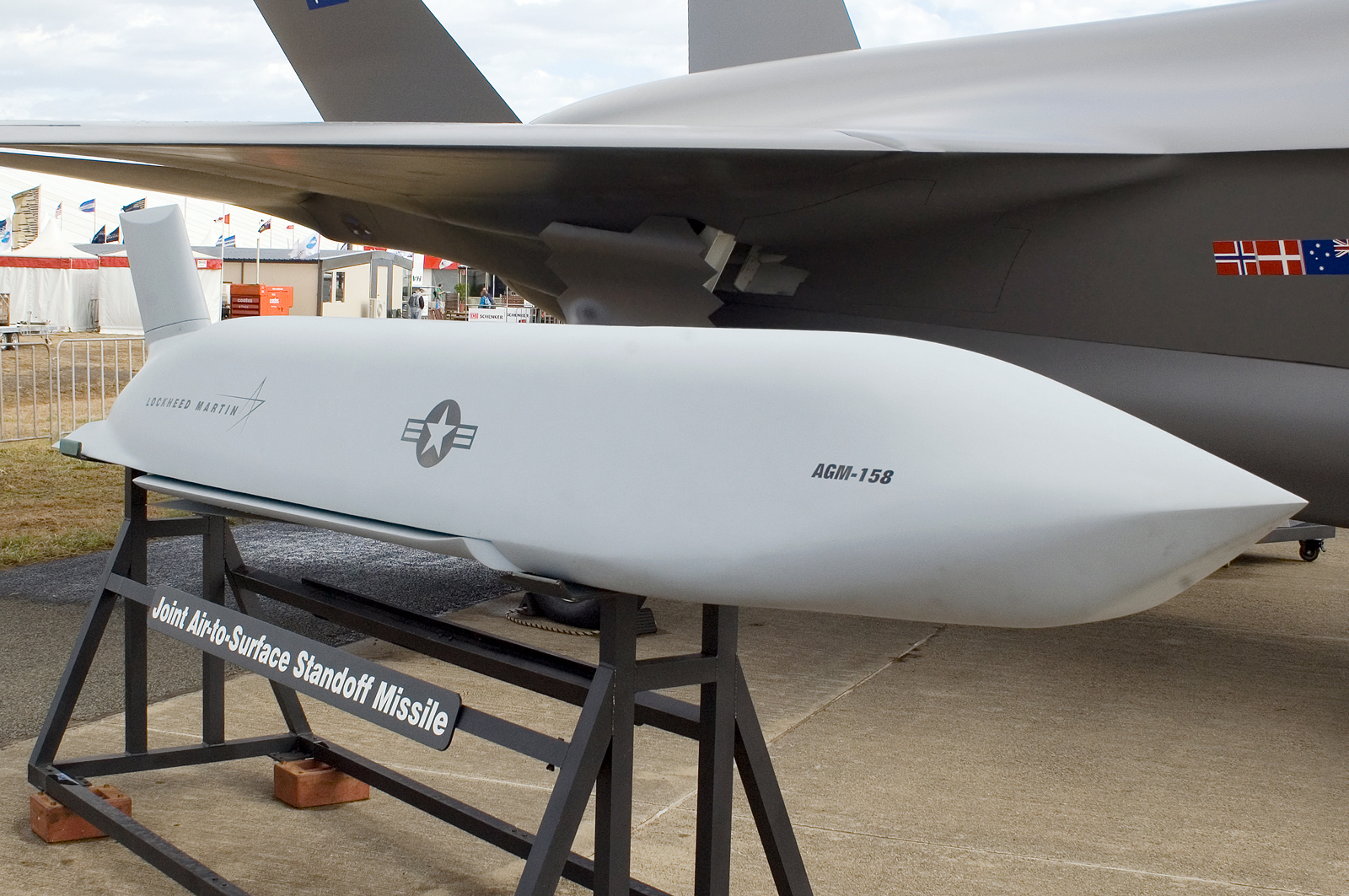
AGM-158 Joint Air-to-Surface Standoff Missile, Australian International Airshow, 2009

Name	Origin	Type	Notes
Air-to-air missile
AIM-120 AMRAAM	United States	beyond-visual-range missile	535 units
AIM-9 Sidewinder	United States	IR guided missile	1466 units, of which 216 are AIM-9X
AIM-260 JATM	United States	beyond-visual-range missile	On order. Approved for up to 450
Air-to-surface missile
AGM-88 HARM	United States	anti-radiation missile	26 units
AGM-88G	United States	anti-radiation missile	Approved for up to 163 units
AGM-154 JSOW	United States	joint standoff glide bomb	50 units
AGM-158B JASSM-ER	United States	standoff air-launched cruise missile	80 units
Air-dropped bomb
Mark 80 Series GP Bomb	United States Australia	low-drag general purpose bomb	Mk 82 – 500 lbs; Mk 83 / BLU-110 – 1000 lbs; Mk 84 – 2000 lbs
JDAM (Joint Direct Attack Munition)	United States	precision-guided munition (precision guidance kit)	350 units: GBU-38 JDAM (Mk 82) – 500 lbs; GBU-32 JDAM (Mk 83 / BLU-110) – 1000 lbs; GBU-31 JDAM (Mk 84) – 2000 lbs; GBU-31(V)3/B JDAM (BLU-109) – 2000 lbs
GBU-10 Paveway II	United States	laser-guided bomb (laser guidance kit)	
GBU-12 Paveway II	United States	laser-guided bomb (laser guidance kit)	350 units
GBU-15	United States	precision-guided munition	100 units
GBU-16 Paveway II	United States	laser-guided bomb (laser guidance kit)	
GBU-39 Small Diameter Bomb	United States	precision-guided glide bomb	2,950 units
GBU-53/B StormBreaker	United States	precision-guided glide bomb	3,950 units
Anti-ship missile
Joint Strike Missile	Norway	Anti-ship and land attack cruise missile	$4 million per unit. To be equipped on F-35.
AGM-158C LRASM	United States	Stealth long range anti-ship missile.	200 units will be integrated onboard the P-8A and F/A-18F.
Mark 54 lightweight torpedo	United States	anti-submarine warfare torpedo	300
AGM-84 Harpoon	United States	Anti-ship missile	

== Personnel ==
=== Strength ===
As of June 2024, the RAAF had 15,261 permanent full-time personnel and 6,341 part-time active reserve personnel.

=== Women ===
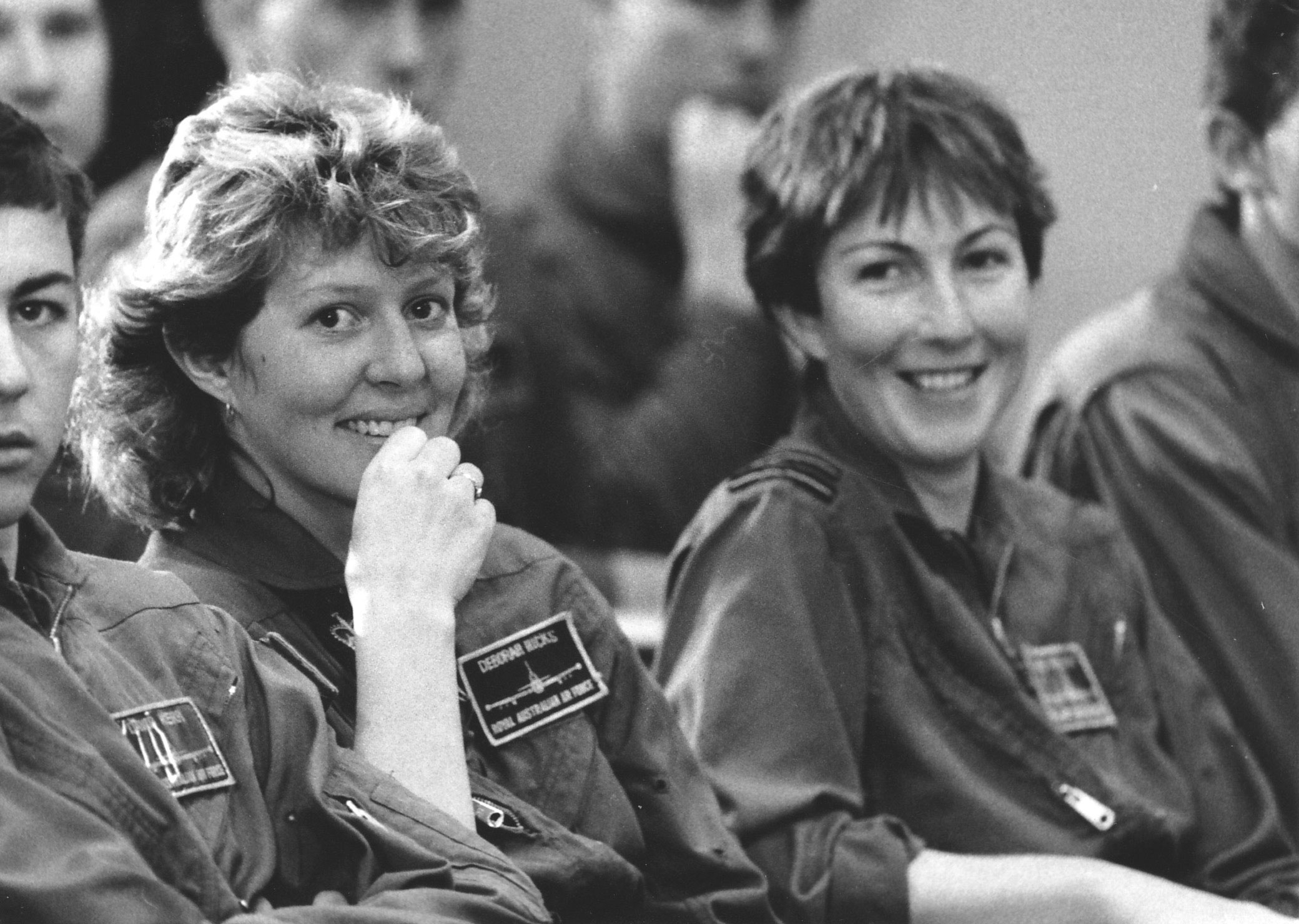
Deborah Hicks and Robyn Williams, the first women to graduate from the RAAF pilots' course in 1988

The RAAF established the Women's Auxiliary Australian Air Force (WAAAF) in March 1941, which then became the Women's Royal Australian Air Force (WRAAF) in 1951. The service merged with the RAAF in 1977; however, all women in the Australian military were barred from combat-related roles until 1990. Women have been eligible for flying roles in the RAAF since 1987, with the RAAF's first women pilots awarded their "wings" in 1988. In 2016, the remaining restrictions on women in frontline combat roles were removed, and the first two female RAAF fast jet fighter pilots graduated in December 2017. Air Force has implemented several programs to assist women who choose a pilot career. Entry to the Graduate Pilot Scheme is open to women who are currently undertaking a Bachelor of Aviation (BAv). Once qualified, women pilots are able to access the Flying Females Mentoring Network. Men and women are required to undergo the same basic fitness tests to become a pilot; however the standards are lower for females. For some roles, the requirement cannot be adjusted for safety reasons.

=== Ranks ===
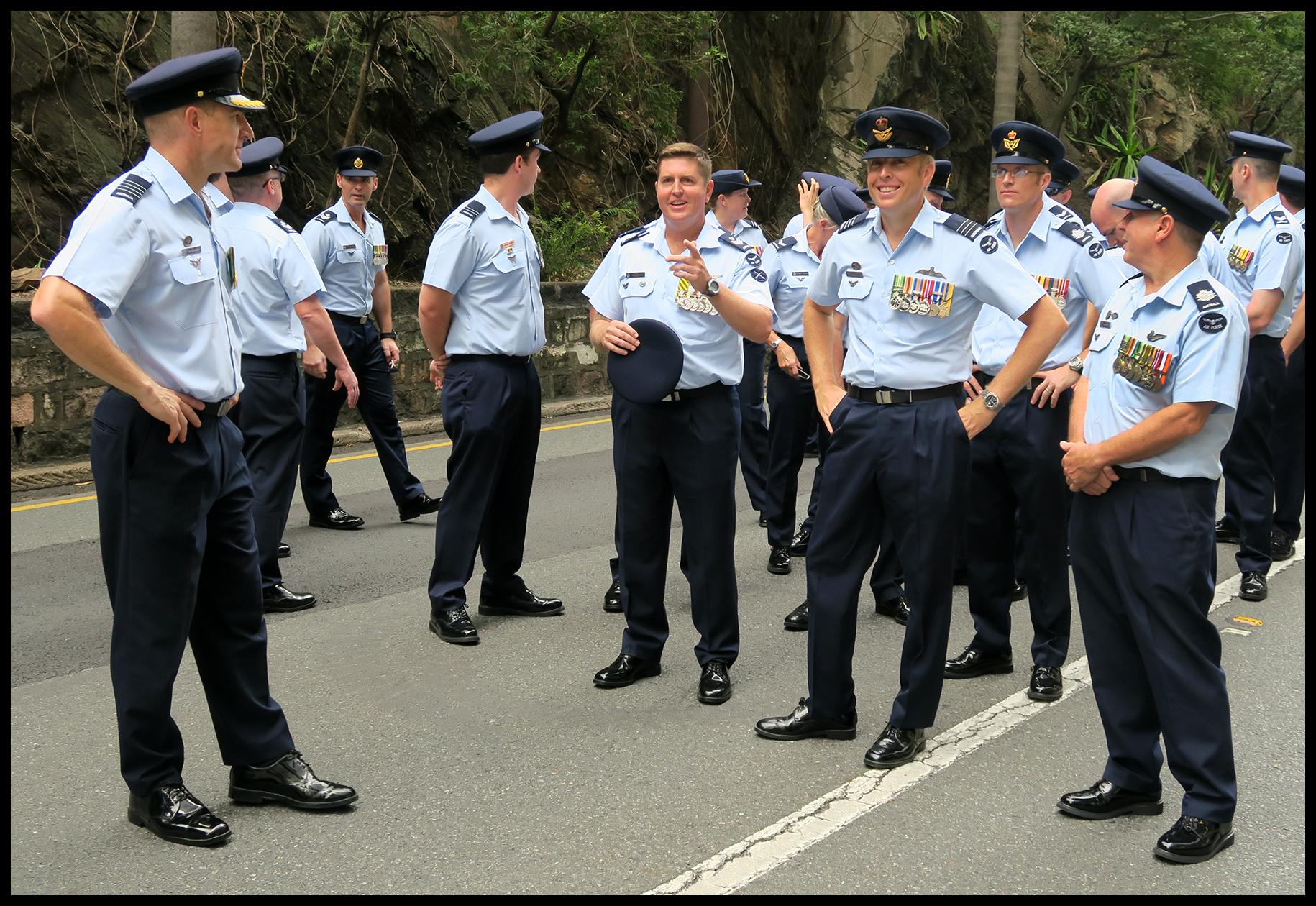
RAAF personnel wearing a variety of shoulder rank slides, 2015

The rank structure of the nascent RAAF was established to ensure that the service remained separate from the Army and Navy. The service's predecessors, the AFC and the AAC, had used the Army's rank structure. In November 1920 it was decided by the Air Board that the RAAF would adopt the structure adopted by the RAF the previous year. As a result, the RAAF's rank structure came to be: Aircraftman, Leading Aircraftman, Corporal, Sergeant, Flight Sergeant, Warrant Officer, Officer Cadet, Pilot Officer, Flying Officer, Flight Lieutenant, Squadron Leader, Wing Commander, Group Captain, Air Commodore, Air Vice-Marshal, Air Marshal, Air Chief Marshal, and Marshal of the RAAF.

==== Officer insignia ====
Rank Grouping	General/Flag Officers					Field/Senior Officers			Junior Officers			Officer Cadet
NATO Code	OF-10	OF-9	OF-8	OF-7	OF-6	OF-5	OF-4	OF-3	OF-2	OF-1		OF(D)
Australia Officer rank insignia
Rank Title:	Marshal of the RAAF	Air Chief Marshal	Air Marshal	Air Vice-Marshal	Air Commodore	Group Captain	Wing Commander	Squadron Leader	Flight Lieutenant	Flying Officer	Pilot Officer	Officer Cadet
Abbreviation:	MRAAF	ACM	AIRMSHL	AVM	AIRCDRE	GPCAPT	WGCDR	SQNLDR	FLTLT	FLGOFF	PLTOFF	OFFCDT

==== Other ranks insignia ====
Rank Group	Warrant Officer		Senior Non-Commissioned Officer		Junior Non-Commissioned Officer	Other ranks
NATO Code	OR-9		OR-8	OR-6	OR-5	OR-3	OR-2	OR-1
Australia Other Ranks Insignia								No insignia
Rank Title:	Warrant Officer of the Air Force	Warrant Officer	Flight Sergeant	Sergeant	Corporal	Leading Aircraftman/ Aircraftwoman	Aircraftman/ Aircraftwoman	Recruit
Abbreviation:	WOFF-AF	WOFF	FSGT	SGT	CPL	LAC/LACW	AC/ACW	ACR/ACWR

=== Uniforms ===
In 1922, the colour of the RAAF winter uniform was determined by Air Marshal Sir Richard Williams on a visit to the Geelong Wool Mill. He asked for one dye dip fewer than the RAN blue (three indigo dips rather than four). There was a change to a lighter blue-grey when an all-seasons uniform was introduced in 1972 by Chief of Air Force Air Marshal Colin Hannah. The original colour and style were re-adopted from 1 January 2000 under direction from the then CAF Air Marshal Errol McCormack. Slip-on rank epaulettes, known as "Soft Rank Insignia" (SRI), displaying the word "AUSTRALIA" are worn on the shoulders of the service dress uniform. When not in the service dress or "ceremonial" uniform, RAAF personnel wear the General Purpose Uniform (GPU) as a working dress, which is a blue version of the Australian Multicam Camouflage Uniform.

== Roundel and badge ==
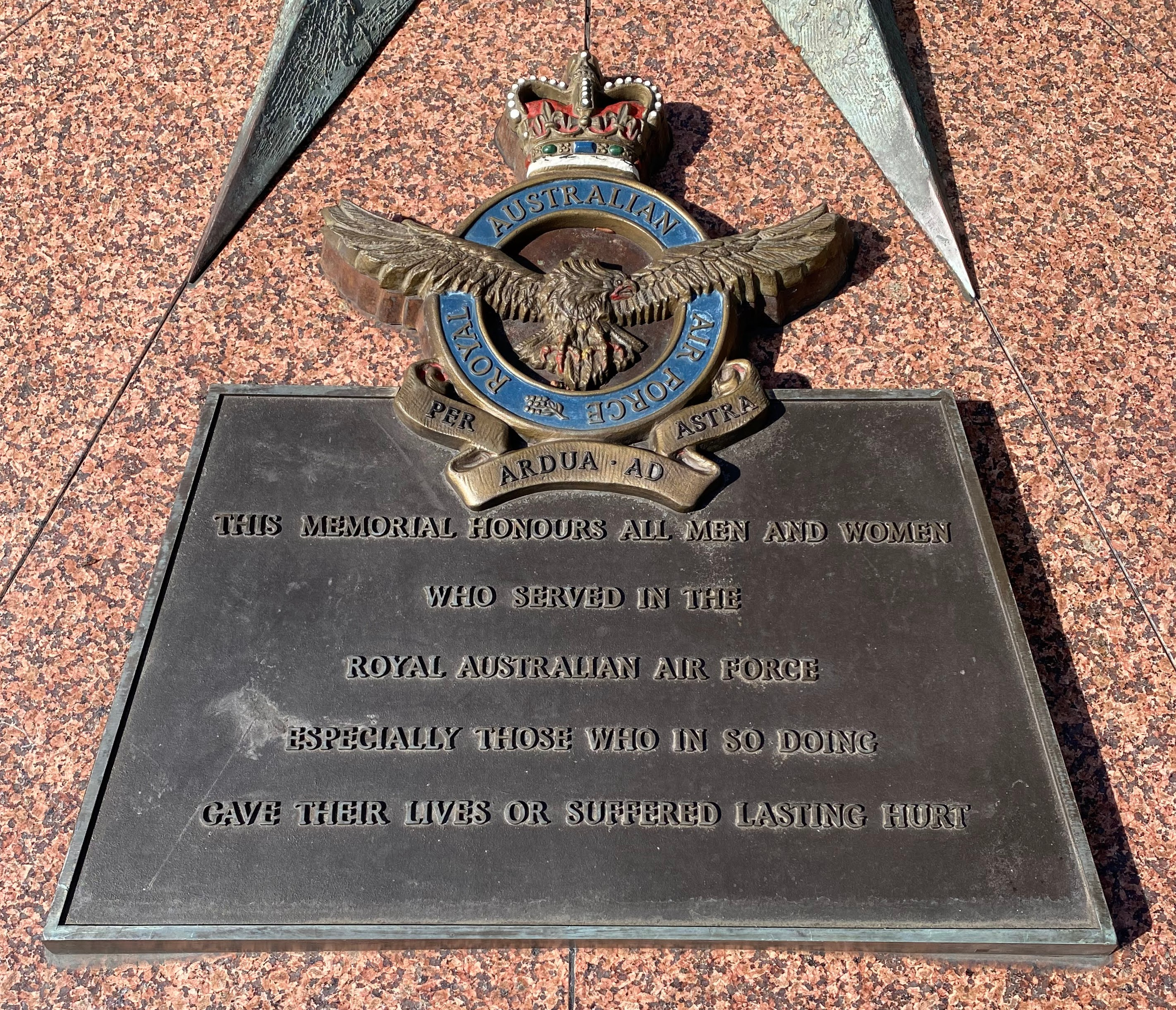
The RAAF badge displayed on the Royal Australian Air Force Memorial in Brisbane

Originally, the air force used the red, white and blue roundel of the RAF. However, during the Second World War the inner red circle, which was visually similar to the Japanese hinomaru, was removed after a No. 11 Squadron Catalina was mistaken for a Japanese aircraft and attacked by a Grumman Wildcat of VMF-212 of the United States Marine Corps on 27 June 1942. After the war, a range of options for the RAAF roundel was proposed, including the Southern Cross, a boomerang, a sprig of wattle, and a red kangaroo. On 2 July 1956, the current version of the roundel was formally adopted. This consists of a white inner circle with a red kangaroo surrounded by a royal blue circle. The kangaroo faces left, except when used on aircraft or vehicles, when the kangaroo should always face forward. Low visibility versions of the roundel exist, with the white omitted and the red and blue replaced with light or dark grey.

The RAAF badge was accepted by the Chester Herald in 1939. The badge is composed of the St Edward's Crown (the Tudor Crown before 1955) mounted on a circle featuring the words Royal Australian Air Force, beneath which scroll work displays the Latin motto Per Ardua Ad Astra, which it shares with the Royal Air Force. Surmounting the badge is a wedge-tailed eagle. Per Ardua Ad Astra is attributed with the meaning "Through Adversity to the Stars" and is from Sir Henry Rider Haggard's novel The People of the Mist. Due to the change in the crown used in King Charles III's cypher, a new version of the badge came into effect from 1 August 2025.

== Music ==
The "Eagles of Australia" is the official march of the RAAF and is played as a quick march when the RAAF bands perform public duties in the capital. Composed by the RAAF's Director of Music, Squadron Leader Ron Mitchell (who was also director of the Air Force Band), it was officially adopted as the RAAF's new march music on 23 March 1983, replacing the Royal Air Force March Past, which had long been the RAAF's march as well as the marchpast of other Commonwealth air forces. Subsequently, journalist Frank Cranston wrote lyrics to the march and a musical score was produced by September of the following year.

== Roulettes ==
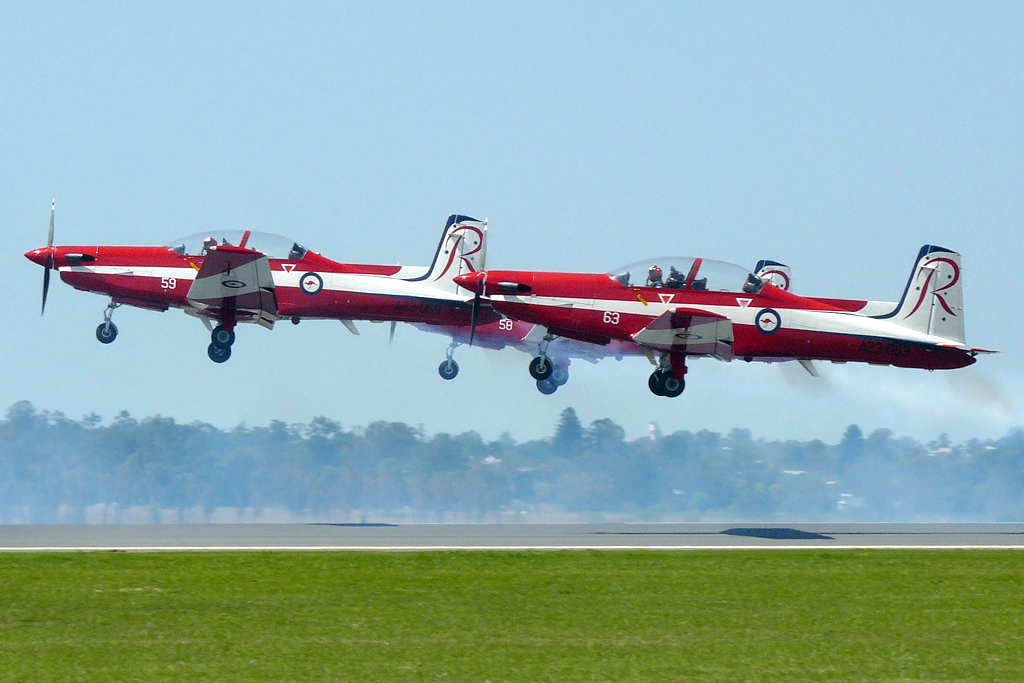
The Roulettes at RAAF Base Amberley in 2008

The Roulettes are the RAAF's formation aerobatic display team. They perform around Australia and Southeast Asia, and are part of the RAAF Central Flying School (CFS) based at RAAF Base East Sale, Victoria. The Roulettes operate the Pilatus PC-21 and formations for shows are a group of six aircraft. The pilots learn many formations including loops, rolls, corkscrews and ripple rolls. Most of the performances are done at a low altitude of 500 feet (150 metres).

== Future procurement ==
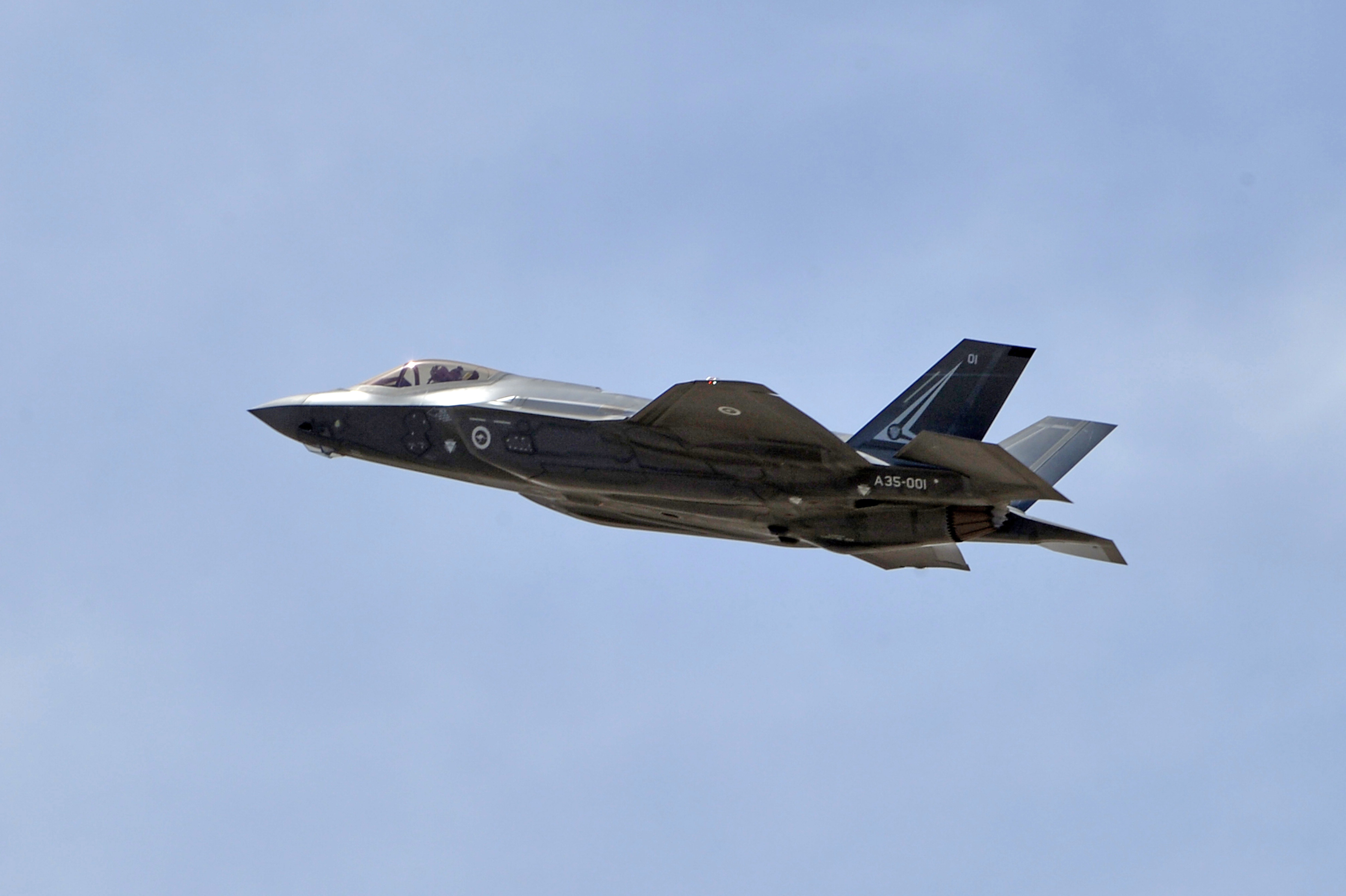
The first Australian F-35A takes off from Luke AFB on a test sortie in 2015.

This list includes aircraft on order or a requirement which has been identified:

- Six MQ-4C Triton unmanned aerial vehicles (UAVs) to expand the surveillance of Australia's maritime approaches, with the possibility of purchasing a seventh air frame. The drones will cost approximately A$6.9 billion over their entire life-time, with the fleet expected to be in service by late 2025. They will be based at RAAF Base Edinburgh however will regularly conduct missions from RAAF Base Tindal.
- A possible further two KC-30As tanker aircraft to support the incoming P-8A fleet, which would bring the total number of aircraft to nine, was announced in the 2016 Defence White Paper.
- In May 2020, Boeing Australia unveiled the Airpower Teaming System (ATS), a joint partnership between the company and the RAAF. The Airpower Teaming System is an unmanned aircraft incorporating artificial intelligence; the aircraft is the first of its kind to be produced in Australia and the first aircraft to be designed and manufactured in Australia for over 50 years.
- A$4–5 billion project to replace the BAE Hawk 127 lead-in fighter trainer was announced in the 2016 Integrated Investment Program that accompanied the 2016 Defence White Paper. The project has a timeframe of 2022 to 2033.
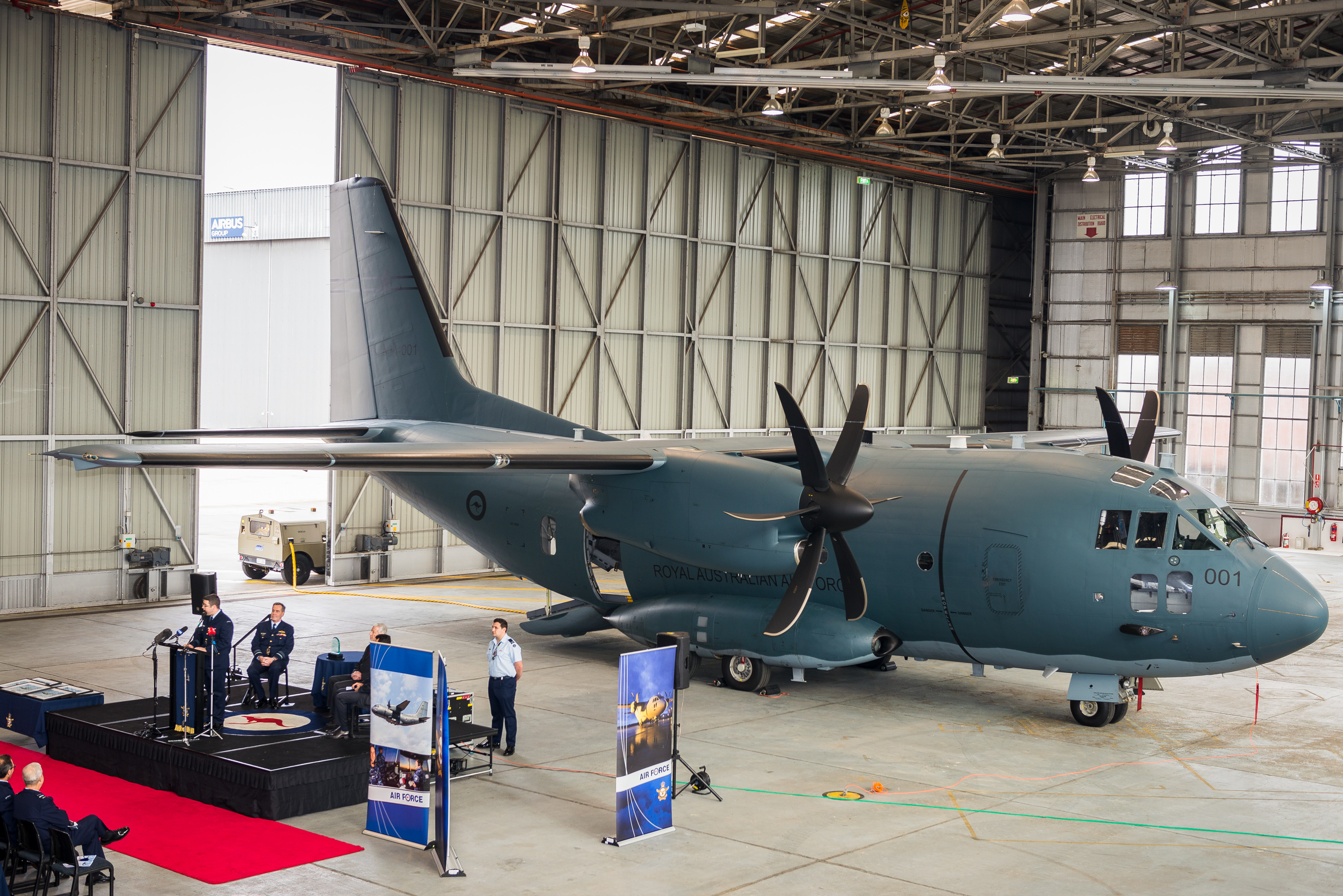
  The first RAAF C-27J Spartan at RAAF Base Richmond in 2015
- Four MC-55A Peregrine SIGINT and ELINT intelligence gathering aircraft, based on the Gulfstream G550, in a A$2.5 billion procurement.
- In July 2020, Prime Minister Scott Morrison announced that Australia would acquire the AGM-158C Long Range Anti-Ship Missile (LRASM) for the F/A-18F Super Hornet. In September 2021, Morrison announced that Australia would acquire the AGM-158B Joint Air-to-Surface Standoff Missile (JASSM-ER) for the F/A-18F Super Hornet and F-35A fighters.
- A$4.9–7.3 billion project to acquire a Medium Range Ground Based Air Defence capability to defend deployed airfields, command centres and other valuable assets from enemy air attack. The project has a timeframe of mid to late 2020s. The project had been named Medium Range Air and Missile Defence in the 2016 Integrated Investment Program. The project was also renamed and renumbered to AIR6502 Phase 1 from AIR6500 Phase 2 for the 2020 Force Structure Plan.
- The full replacement and expansion of the existing 12 C-130J Super Hercules fleet to 20 aircraft. Announced in July 2023 by Defence Minister Richard Marles, the fleet expansion and renewal is budgeted at A$9.8 billion.
- Australia will purchase Hypersonic Attack Cruise Missile, a Mach 8 hypersonic air-launched cruise missile as a follow-on for the domestic SCIFiRE program. These will be procured following FY2027.

== See also ==
- Airfield Defence Guards
- Australian Air Force Cadets
- Australian Air Traffic Control
- Australian Defence Force ranks and insignia
- Royal Australian Air Force Maritime Section
- Royal Australian Air Force VIP aircraft
- Air Force (newspaper)

=== Lists ===
- List of air forces
- List of current Royal Australian Air Force aircraft
- List of aircraft of the Royal Australian Air Force
- List of Royal Australian Air Force aircraft squadrons
- List of Royal Australian Air Force independent aircraft flights
- List of Royal Australian Air Force installations
- List of ships of the Royal Australian Air Force

=== Memorials and museums ===
- List of Australian military memorials
- Royal Australian Air Force Memorial, Brisbane
- Royal Australian Air Force Memorial, Canberra
