= Air Force Headquarters RAAF =

Air Force Headquarters
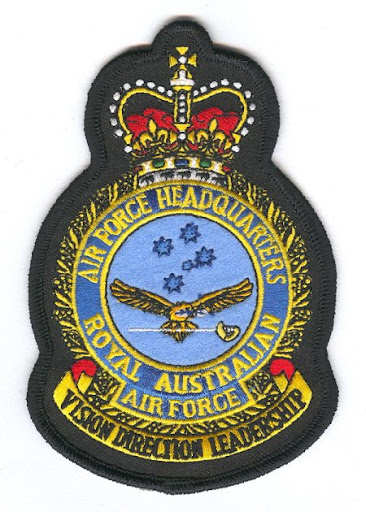
- Active: 31 March 1921 - Current
- Country: Australia
- Role: Command of the Royal Australian Air Force
- Mottos: Vision, Direction, Leadership
- Website: https://www.airforce.gov.au/about-us/structure/air-force-headquarters

Commanders
- Chief of Air Force: Air Marshal Stephen Chappell DSC, CSC, OAM
- Deputy Chief of Air Force: Air Vice-Marshal Harvey Reynolds, AM
- Head of Air Force Capability: Air Vice-Marshal Nicholas Hogan, CSC
- Warrant Officer of the Air Force: Warrant Officer of the Air Force Ralph Clifton

Air Force Headquarters RAAF is the headquarters of the Royal Australian Air Force. It provides strategic leadership to the Air Force and provides policy guidance for Air Force activities to the rest of the Australian Defence Force and Australian Government.

The Chief of Air Force oversees activities that raise, train and sustain assigned Air Force capabilities.

The Deputy Chief of Air Force acts as the manager of the headquarters and provides strategic leadership of Air Force Headquarters in the following domains:

- Air power concepts and doctrine
- Enterprise design strategy
- Preparedness
- Policy
- Resource and business management
- Corporate governance
- Reputation, brand management and heritage preservation
- Holistic workforce and cadet management
- Personnel well-being mechanisms and organisational culture.

The Head of Air Force Capability acts as the Air Force Capability Manager representative during modernisation and sustainment activities and provides strategic leadership of Air Force Headquarters in the following domains:

- Air and space enabling capability concepts
- Force structure requirements for Air Force
- IIP management and affordable development of new capability systems
- Transition of new capabilities
- Joint logistics systems planning
- Capability workforce planning.

Key focus areas include:

- resources
- personnel
- force placement
- infrastructure
- future force considerations
