= Gon =

Gon or GON may refer to:

== Arts ==
- Gon (manga), a Japanese manga series by Masashi Tanaka
  - Gon (video game), a 1994 video game based on the manga series
  - Gon: Baku Baku Baku Baku Adventure, a 2012 video game based on the manga series
- Gon Freecss, the main character from the manga series Hunter × Hunter
- Gon, the Little Fox, a Japanese children's story by Nankichi Niimi

== People ==
- Taika Gon (1906–1971), Korean runner
- Masashi Nakayama (born 1967), Japanese soccer player

== Other uses ==
- Gon (unit), a unit of plane angle
- Gon, Burkina Faso
- Gondi language
- Goornong railway station, Australia
- Government of Norway
- Greater occipital nerve
- Groton–New London Airport, in Connecticut, United States

== See also ==
- Goon (disambiguation)
- Gone (disambiguation)
