= Roy Goon =

Australian World War II fighter pilot

Roy Francis Goon
- Born: 13 September 1913; Ballarat, Victoria
- Died: 15 November 1999 (aged 86)
- Military career
- Allegiance: Australia
- Branch: Royal Australian Air Force
- Service years: 1940–1945
- Rank: Squadron Leader
- Commands: No. 83 Squadron RAAF (1943–45)
- Conflicts: World War II; South West Pacific theatre
- Awards: Mentioned in Despatches

Roy Francis Goon (13 September 1913 – 15 November 1999) was an Australian World War II fighter pilot. Goon held Commercial pilot licence No. 511 and was originally an instructor with the Royal Victorian Aero Club (RVAC) at Essendon Airport, then later at Moorabbin, Wangaratta, Benalla, Albury, Corowa, Shepparton, Mildura and Swan Hill. Goon also held Aircraft Engineer's Licence C and D grades.

== Military career ==
Goon's military career began when in 1935, flying Boeing P-26 Peashooter fighters with Chiang Kai-shek's forces in the Second Sino-Japanese War alongside Garnet Malley, and was credited with three kills with the Flying Tigers.

Goon was one of a select group of civilian instructors who taught Royal Australian Air Force (RAAF) personnel to fly. However, Goon had difficulty enlisting, as despite being born in Australia, his Chinese heritage conflicted with the RAAF decree that "all candidates of the Empire Air Training Scheme must be British subjects of pure European descent and also sons of parents both of whom are ... British subjects". Goon was eventually able to enlist via support from fellow RVAC member and then Minister for Air, the Hon. James Fairbairn.

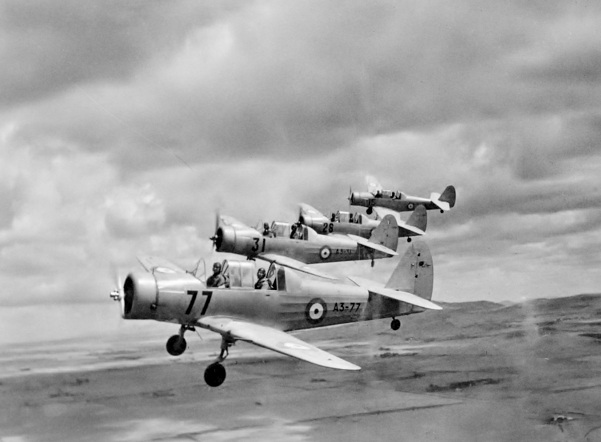
Wackett Trainers, at Ballarat (Vic.) The four aircraft from No. 3 Elementary Flying Training School, Essendon (Vic), were led by 280427, Flight Lieutenant Kenneth Holmes Wood in A3-77. Other aircraft were flown by instructors with pupils, 251367, Flight Lieutenant James Connelly Kinnear, and 251686, Flight Lieutenant Roy Francis Goon; and last instructor's name not recorded.

Goon subsequently enlisted as a Pilot Officer in July, 1940 and flew a variety of aircraft including the DH 60, DH82, Avro Cadet Trainers, Miles Falcon, Oxford, Wirraway, Bell P-39 Aircobra, Curtis P40E, Waco C & D, Boeing P26A, Stinson Reliant, Kittyhawk and CAC Boomerang. Goon was promoted to Squadron Leader of No. 83 Squadron RAAF in August 1943.

In 1945, Goon was Mentioned in Dispatches with his Citation noting:

"Squadron Leader Goon was posted to command No. 83 I/F Squadron which moved to the North Western area in January 1944. No. 83 Squadron was responsible for the protection of convoys and the shipping route from Horn Island to Darwin and the base at Gove. These shipping patrols were particularly arduous. They necessitated long flights over the seas in single engine aircraft in all weathers. Squadron Leader Goon displayed conspicuous leadership and devotion to duty and was at all times an inspiration to all personnel under his Command".

== Post war career ==
After the war with 5,000 hours in the log book, he continued his flying career in general aviation. He also flew for the Royal Flying Doctor Service service based out of Whyalla. In 1958, he became a test pilot with the Commonwealth Aircraft Corporation, operating CAC Ceres crop dusting aircraft and also CAC Wirraway conversions.

Goon was still with RVAC in the late 1960s in the advanced training live-in college, training Qantas and TAA cadets. The RVAC estimated that Goon trained over 800 pilots in peace and in war. One of his students was RAAF fighter ace, "Bluey" Truscott DFC & Bar. Roy Goon was also an outstanding aerobatic pilot and received Life Membership of the Australian Aerobatic Club.

Roy Goon's contribution to Australia's war effort is acknowledged in the Harvest of Endurance, a 50-metre-long scroll that represents two centuries of Chinese contact with, and emigration to, Australia.

== Bibliography ==
- Wong, Geoff (2023). ""A Real Australian": The Wartime Flying Career of Sqn Ldr Roy Goon". The Aviation Historian (42): 66–75. ISSN 2051-1930.
