= Goon Squad (disambiguation) =

A goon squad is a group of thugs or mercenaries, commonly associated with anti-union or pro-union violence.

Goon Squad may also refer to:

- Goon Squad (band), a dance music group assembled by Arthur Baker in the mid-1980s
- Goon Sqwad, a hiphop group which had Proof as a member
- Guardians of the Oglala Nation, or GOONs squad, a private paramilitary group active on the Pine Ridge Indian Reservation during the early 1970s
- "Goon Squad", 1979 song from the Elvis Costello album Armed Forces
- "Goon Squad", a song by Deftones from their 2012 album Koi No Yokan
- The "Goon Squad", a volunteer group formed in 1944 at Syracuse University
- The Goon Squad, a fictional basketball team in the 2021 film Space Jam: A New Legacy
- "Goon Squad", the perpetrators of the Rankin County torture incident

== See also ==
- A Visit from the Goon Squad, a 2010 novel by Jennifer Egan
- Goon (disambiguation)
- Vigilante
- Mercenary
- Thug (disambiguation)
- Squad (disambiguation)
