= Fred David =

Austrian-born Australian aircraft designer

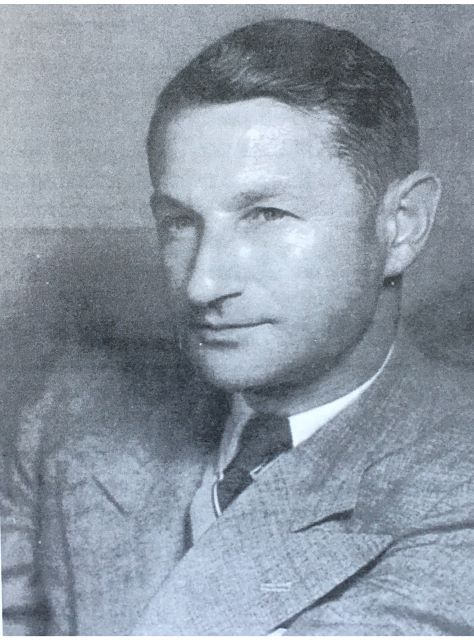
- Born: Friedrich Wilhelm Dawid (David); 17 January 1900; Vienna, Austria
- Died: 28 September 1992 (aged 92); Melbourne, Australia
- Citizenship: Austria (by birth); Australian (from circa 1945)
- Education: Engineering degree
- Alma mater: TU Wien
- Occupation: Aircraft Designer
- Employer(s): Heinkel; Knoll aircraft Co. Aichi Kokuki; Commonwealth Aircraft Corporation; Commonwealth Scientific and Industrial Research Organisation; Australian Aeronautical Research Laboratories
- Known for: Aircraft industry
- Title: Chief Aircraft Designer / Chief Engineer; Assistant Controller Guided Weapons; Superintendent of Aerodynamics

Friedrich Wilhelm "Fred" David, an Austrian Jew, who became the most significant aircraft designer for the Australian aircraft industry during World War Two; having been one of only a few people to have worked for both sides (Allies and Axis powers) in designing aircraft used during the war. David's most famous aircraft was the CAC Boomerang used by the Royal Australian Air Force during the Pacific War.

As an Austrian Jew who had recently arrived in Australia in 1939 as a refugee, David was technically an enemy alien, so he had to report to the local police station weekly having been interned by Australian immigration officials. David was well-suited to the CAC project, since he had previously worked for Heinkel in pre-Nazi Germany, as well as Mitsubishi and Aichi Kokuki in Japan. His design contributions in Japan resulted in the Mitsubishi A5M Claude fighter and the Aichi D3A Type 99 Val dive-bomber.

Fred David worked on several projects throughout the war but his most technically advanced aircraft never got past the prototype stage, the CAC CA-15 Kangaroo piston fighter. The project was commissioned in early 1943 to overcome the speed and aeronautical limitations of the CAC Boomerang but the prototype did not fly until March 1946. However, despite the aircraft exceeding the maximum speed and climb rate of the Spitfire and Mustang, it was now obsolete with the dawn of the jet age.

After the war, Fred David moved on to working for the Australian government's research arm becoming a specialist in aerodynamics. This role evolved into becoming the team head of the Ikara (missile) project that designed the anti-submarine missile used by the RAN, Royal Navy, Chilean Navy and Brazilian Navy.

== See also ==
- Commonwealth Aircraft Corporation
- CAC Boomerang
- CAC Woomera
- CAC Wirraway
- CAC Wackett
- CAC CA-15
- List of aircraft of the Royal Australian Air Force
- Australian Aeronautical Research Laboratories
- Ikara (missile)
