= SQN =

SQN or Sqn may refer to:

- sine qua non, a Latin legal term
- Sine Qua Non (wine), a California winery
- Squadron (disambiguation), for which Sqn is a common abbreviation
