= Go On =

Go On may refer to:

- Go On (actor) (born 1992), South Korean actor and model
- Go On (TV series), a TV series starring Matthew Perry
- Go On..., the third album by American pop band Mr. Mister
- "Go On" (song), a country music song recorded by George Strait
- "Go-On", a song by Uverworld from the album Last
- "Go On", a song by Sia from the album Reasonable Woman

== See also ==
- Go-on, one of the different readings of Japanese kanji
- Go (disambiguation)
- On (disambiguation)
- Gon (disambiguation)
- Goon (disambiguation)
