= CAC Boomerang =

Australian fighter aircraft produced by Commonwealth Aircraft Corporation

Boomerang
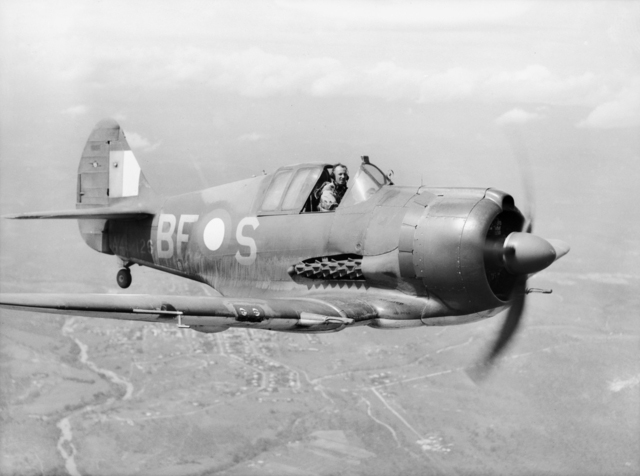
- A Boomerang from No. 5 Squadron RAAF

General information
- Type: Fighter aircraft
- National origin: Australia/United States
- Manufacturer: Commonwealth Aircraft Corporation
- Designer: Fred David
- Status: Retired
- Primary user: Royal Australian Air Force
- Number built: 250

History
- Manufactured: 1942–1945
- Introduction date: 1943
- First flight: 29 May 1942
- Developed from: CAC Wirraway

The CAC Boomerang is a fighter aircraft designed and manufactured in Australia by the Commonwealth Aircraft Corporation between 1942 and 1945. Approved for production shortly following the Empire of Japan's entry into the Second World War, the Boomerang was rapidly designed as to meet the urgent demands for fighter aircraft to equip the Royal Australian Air Force (RAAF). It was the first combat aircraft designed and constructed in Australia.

Different variants of the Boomerang were manufactured under a series of corresponding production contract numbers CA-12, CA-13, CA-14 and CA-19. The aircraft supplied under each contract incorporated modifications, typically aimed at improving the aircraft's performance. The Boomerang was handicapped by the available engine variant, which gave low power at altitude and resulted in the aircraft proving to be slower than contemporary fighter aircraft.

The Boomerang rarely engaged in aerial combat. During early wartime operations, the Boomerang was mainly dispatched to equip home-based squadrons, freeing up other fighters for use overseas. In later service, the Boomerang was commonly used for ground support duties, cooperating with Allied army units, in addition to secondary roles such as aerial reconnaissance and air sea rescue.

== Development ==
=== Background ===
In the mid 1930s, some political leaders observed that both the Empire of Japan and Nazi Germany appeared to be preparing for war, which led to other countries commencing their own preparations.

In Australia, the nation's small domestic aircraft industry required substantial expansion and reorganization to produce modern combat aircraft in sufficient numbers. While Tugan Aircraft had built eight examples of a small twin engine transport to their own design, as an organization they were too small to be reasonably expected to expand into the role of producing large numbers of modern combat aircraft in a timely manner. An additional hurdle was the lack of experience in Australia outside of light private and small commercial aircraft, as all military aircraft had been procured from overseas manufacturers, mainly in the United Kingdom. On 17 October 1936, with the encouragement of the Government of Australia, three companies formed a joint venture, registered as the Commonwealth Aircraft Corporation (CAC), which had the goal of developing a self-sufficient aircraft industry. Other companies joined them, and Tugan Aircraft was taken over by the CAC.

The CAC planned both engine and aircraft manufacturing and testing facilities at Fishermans Bend, Melbourne, purchasing tooling and equipment from manufacturers in both Britain and the United States. While the CAC initially pursued the development and production of the CAC Wirraway, a single-engine armed advanced trainer aircraft which was a licence-built version of the North American NA-16, the CAC later received substantial orders for large numbers of military aircraft, in particular fighters, to equip the Royal Australian Air Force (RAAF). In July 1940, when the United Kingdom was the sole European nation still fighting against Germany, the Australian Government issued a statement advising that "from this date onward Australia can rely on England for no further supplies of any aircraft materials or equipment of any kind.

On 7 December 1941, the Pacific War began with a series of unanticipated near-simultaneous attacks by Japanese forces against Pearl Harbor, Thailand, Malaya and the Philippines. With Japan gaining control over vast areas of the Pacific and South East Asia within just a few months, Australia was in a precarious position. Two Australian squadrons were stationed in Europe, and four squadrons in Malaya. Two of the Malayan squadrons were equipped with Lockheed Hudson medium bombers, one with Wirraways as general purpose aircraft, and another with the lacklustre Brewster Buffalo fighter. There was a distinct need of a strong Australian fighter force at that time.

While most RAAF aircraft came from the UK, by 1942, the British aircraft industry was hard-pressed to even meet the needs of its own country. Meanwhile, companies in the United States possessed enormous aircraft manufacturing capacity, but their output was at this point being monopolized by the United States Army Air Forces (USAAF) and United States Navy (USN), which were also at war with Japan. Even where capacity could be found for new aircraft to be built overseas, their delivery would require them to be shipped considerable distances in wartime conditions, with consequent delays and at the risk of considerable losses, in particular due to German U-boats and Japanese submarines.

While damaged USAAF fighters such as the Curtiss P-40 Kittyhawk and Bell P-39 Airacobra in Australia's region could be rebuilt by Australian workshops and even loaned to RAAF units, they were not available in sufficient numbers.

=== Origins ===
In late 1941, Lawrence Wackett, Manager and Chief Designer of CAC, began examining the possibility of designing and building a new domestically-designed fighter aircraft. The main challenge to this ambition was that fighter aircraft had never been manufactured in Australia. According to aviation author Rene J. Francillon, many experts considered that the licensed manufacture of a complete fighter aircraft would be beyond the capabilities of Australia's industry at that time. Wackett quickly decided to use elements of aircraft which were already being produced in Australia. Only two military aircraft were in production at the time: the CAC Wirraway, based on the North American NA-16, and the Bristol Beaufort bomber.

Overseas, the NA-16 had already become the basis of the North American NA-50 fighter, also known as the P-64, which had been used by the Peruvian Air Force in the 1941 Ecuadorian–Peruvian War. Crucially, CAC's licence to manufacture the Wirraway already contained a clause allowing the design to be modified. Wackett decided to use the airframe of the Wirraway as a starting point for the design of the new domestic fighter. This choice had the advantages of requiring little additional tooling, and of speeding up design and establishing manufacturing.

Although British designers had reworked the twin-engined Beaufort into a successful attack aircraft, the Beaufighter, this was not a suitable basis for the sought-after single-engine interceptor aircraft. Australian-made Beauforts used 1,200 horsepower (890 kW) Pratt & Whitney R-1830 Twin Wasp engines, which were made under licence at the CAC plant in Lidcombe, Sydney. Another factor in favour of the engine was that it was already in use to power the Grumman F4F Wildcat fighters of the United States Navy, which helped make the Twin Wasp a logical choice to power the domestic fighter design.

Wackett promptly recruited designer Fred David, an Austrian Jew who had recently arrived in Australia as a refugee. As David was technically an enemy alien, he had been interned by Australian immigration officials. He was well-suited to the CAC project, since he had previously worked for Heinkel in pre-Nazi Germany, and for Mitsubishi and Aichi in Japan. As a result of this past, David possessed an excellent understanding of advanced fighter designs, including the Mitsubishi A6M ("Zero"), used by the Imperial Japanese Naval Air Service, and the Heinkel He 112, a contemporary of the Messerschmitt Bf 109 used in small numbers by Axis air forces in Europe.

In December 1941, the management of CAC issued its authorisation to proceed with the detailed design of the new fighter aircraft. The aircraft, which had received the internal designation of CA-12, used the wing, tail assembly, undercarriage, and center section of the Wirraway in combination with a new forward fuselage, which housed the larger Twin Wasp engine. It had a new single-seat cockpit with a sliding hood, and carried an armament of two 20 mm Hispano-Suiza HS.404 cannons and four .303 machine guns.

The proposal was presented to the Australian Government, which promptly gave its approval, viewing the CA-12 as appropriate insurance against the delay or cancellation of its order for US-built P-40 fighters, as well as a desire to maintain work at CAC. The ready availability of usable Wirraway components for the CA-12, which would greatly speed up any manufacturing program, was also viewed favourably.

On 18 February 1942, the Australian War Cabinet authorised an order for 105 CA-12 aircraft. Shortly after, the name Boomerang was selected for the aircraft. The ordering of production aircraft had been made in advance of any prototype being produced or maiden flight performed: the Boomerang had been effectively ordered 'off the drawing board'.

=== Prototypes and early production ===
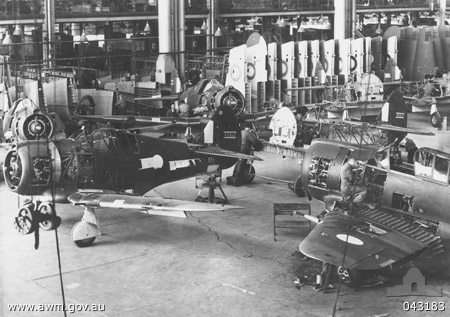
Boomerangs under construction at CAC's factory at Fishermans Bend

On 29 May 1942, the prototype Boomerang, A46-1, conducted its maiden flight from Fishermans Bend, flown by CAC pilot Ken Frewin. This initial prototype had been completed within only three months of having received the order to proceed, which was a considerably rare accomplishment for the era. A46-1 was quickly put to use for a series of test flights, being flown either by Frewin or by RAAF pilot John Harper. These tests reportedly went smoothly, with the prototype proving to be easy to handle and quite manoeuvrable.

An issue with engine cooling was encountered, which led to a revision of the oil cooler intake and the addition of a spinner to the propeller upon A46-3 onwards. On 15 July, No. 1 Aircraft Depot (1 AD) of the RAAF formally received A46-1 (bu. no. 824) from CAC.

Comparison flight tests were undertaken by 1 AD, pitting the CA-12 against a Brewster Buffalo (A51-6) that had been lightened and re-weighted to approximate the flight characteristics of a Zero, as well as a Curtiss P-40E/Kittyhawk Mk I (A29-129) and a Bell P-400/Airacobra Mk Ia (BW127). It was found that the Boomerang was faster in level flight than the Buffalo, although the Buffalo out-manoeuvred it. The Boomerang was superior in armament, with two 20 mm cannon and four .303 calibre (7.7 mm) machine guns, all mounted in the short, thick wings. Its pilots were better protected, with generous armour plating, than Japanese fighter pilots.

While the CA-12 was lively at low level, its performance fell away rapidly above altitudes of 15,000 ft (4,600 m). Its maximum speed of 265 knots (490 km/h) was not sufficient to make it an effective counter to Japanese fighters like the Zero and the Japanese Army's Nakajima Ki 43 ("Oscar"). Similarly, the best European fighters were reaching almost 350 knots (650 km/h), and even relatively sluggish contemporary fighters – like the Grumman F4F Wildcat and the Curtiss Kittyhawk Mk I – were substantially faster than the Boomerang.

From March 1942, there was less pressure to place the CA-12 into production as multiple USAAF units, operating a mixture of P-40 and P-39 fighters, were being deployed in strength to northern Australia. The RAAF had also begun to receive new Kittyhawk fighters. In June 1943, manufacturing work upon the original order for 105 CA-12s was completed. During production of this batch, several modifications and improvements were incorporated onto the CA-12. These included the strengthening of the spinner back plates and belly tank locating pins, the installation of underwing night flying identification lights, and a revised electrical starter system. Many of these modifications were retrofitted onto early production models at operational bases as well.

In the face of difficulties experienced by CAC in the development of the CAC Woomera, a twin-engine bomber aircraft which was ultimately cancelled in September 1944, the Australian government elected to extend the production arrangement for the Boomerang, extending its orders from 105 to 250 aircraft. These additional 145 aircraft were manufactured in four distinct versions, the CA-13, the CA-14, CA-14A and CA-19. 95 CA-13s and 49 CA-19s, were completed. One prototype of the supercharged Boomerang CA-14 and its modified CA-14A form were produced. In February 1945, the final Boomerang to be manufactured, A46-249, a CA-19 model, was completed.

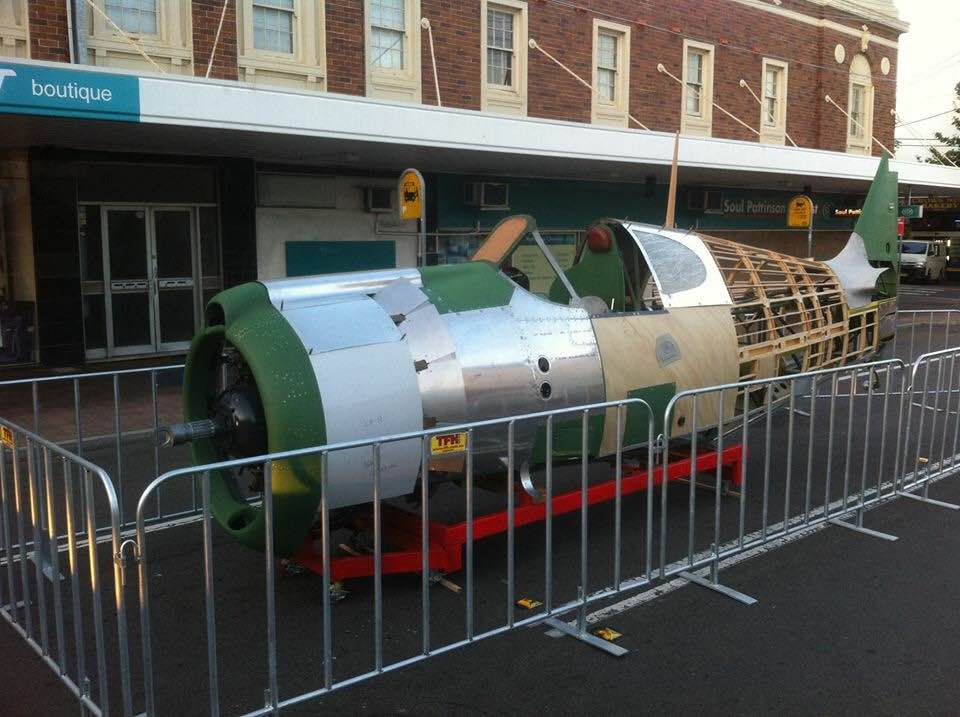
A46-89 Fuselage

=== Further development ===
During the flight testing phase of development work upon the initial CA-12 model, CAC began work upon a new variant which featured performance improvements in terms of speed, climb and ceiling. Designated CA-14, this aircraft was designed around an order for 145 U.S.-built, 1,700 hp (1,268 kW) Wright Cyclone R-2600 engines. The Wright engines ordered were not delivered as scheduled, and in mid-1942 Wackett authorised use of the 1,850 hp (1,380 kW) Pratt & Whitney R-2800, which was available from the CAC factory in Lidcombe. Due to the layout of the Boomerang's compact fuselage, the supercharger for the engine was installed in the rear fuselage. A new three-bladed variable pitch Curtiss-built propeller was also initially adopted.

The significantly greater weight of this powerplant made undercarriage failure a significant risk. The R-2800 engine was later intended to be used on the Boomerang's successor, the CAC CA-15 "Kangaroo". CAC eventually returned to the Twin Wasp, to which it added a General Electric B-2 turbo-supercharger mounted inside the rear part of the fuselage, new propeller gear, a geared cooling fan (influenced by intelligence reports from Europe regarding captured German BMW 801 twin-row radial engines, which were used by the Focke-Wulf Fw 190A) and a larger, squared-off tailfin and rudder.

By July 1943, the significantly re-worked CA-14 prototype, now known as the CA-14A, had a top speed 25–30% faster than the CA-12, and an operational ceiling 4,000 ft (1,200 m) higher. Testing of the later Boomerang variants found that they compared favourably, under some conditions, with the Spitfire Mk V, as well as early variants of the Republic Thunderbolt (P-47) and North American Mustang (P-51). By that time, the Spitfire had filled the interceptor role, and CAC was on the verge of commencing the manufacture of Mustangs under licence to fill the bomber escort, air superiority and close air support roles. The CA-14 never entered production.

== Design ==
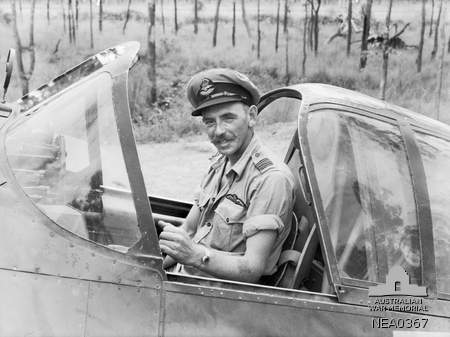
Wing Commander A. E. Cook in the cockpit of a CAC Boomerang fighter

The Boomerang was a small single-engine monoplane fighter aircraft, designed with an emphasis on high manoeuvrability. It had a stubby appearance, due to the smaller Wirraway airframe being paired with the considerably larger 1,200 horsepower (890 kW) Pratt & Whitney R-1830 Twin Wasp radial engine, which drove a three-bladed Hamilton Standard Hydromatic propeller, license-built by de Havilland. The engine was closely cowled, with an air scoop fixed to the upper side for the carburetor, and another fitted to the lower side for the oil cooler. Fuel was divided between one fuselage-housed 70-imperial-gallon (320-litre) self-sealing fuel tank and a pair of 45 imp gal (200 L) tanks within the center section of the wing.

Although the original intention during development had been to use as many Wirraway components as possible, the final design of the Boomerang differed substantially, with shorter wings, a shorter, wood-sheathed, aluminium-framed fuselage, strengthened to withstand combat stresses, and an original centre section. The low-mounted cantilever wing consisted of five sections: a central section, a pair of outer sections, and two detachable wing tips; the outer sections had a swept-back leading edge along with a straight trailing edge. The wing used a single spar and a stressed skin construction, along with fabric-covered ailerons, aluminium trim tabs and split trailing edge flaps. The main undercarriage hydraulically retracted into wheelwells forward of the main spar.

The Boomerang had a new single-seat cockpit directly over the centre of the wing, which was furnished with a sliding canopy with 1.5-inch (38 mm) bulletproof glass and armor protection. Common to many of the latest fighters at the time, the Boomerang was equipped with automatic cannons; as no such weapons had previously been manufactured in Australia, a pair of British-made Hispano-Suiza 20 mm were used. Allegedly, an example which an Australian airman had collected as a souvenir in the Middle East was reverse-engineered. Other armament fitted included four Browning .303 machine guns, with provision for up to four 20 lb smoke bombs; all of these were mounted within the wings.

== Operational history ==
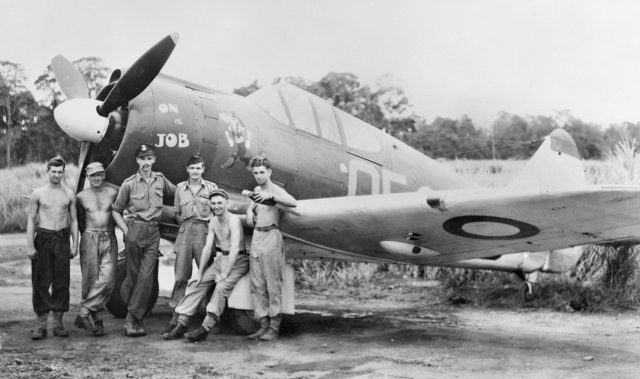
A No. 4 Squadron Boomerang and ground crew at Nadzab, New Guinea, October 1943

On 19 October 1942, CA-12 A46-6 (bu. no. 829) became the first Boomerang to reach a training/conversion unit, it was immediately put to use training pilots when it was transferred to No. 2 OTU, from 1 AD. In the training role, while generally being considered to be a success according to Rene, pilots without previous operational experience had difficulty transitioning from the Wirraway to the Boomerang due to its poor forward visibility; the reflector gun sight was subsequently relocated to improve pilot vision.

No. 83 Squadron became the first fighter unit to receive Boomerangs, when several were delivered to replace Airacobras at Strathpine Airfield in Strathpine, Queensland on 10 April 1943. A few weeks later, CA-12s were also received by a frontline air defence unit, No. 84 Squadron which was stationed on Horn Island Airfield, in Torres Strait. The third Boomerang fighter unit, No. 85 Squadron, like No. 83 Squadron, was performing home defence duties, at RAAF Guildford (later Perth Airport); the Boomerangs replaced the squadron's Buffaloes.

On 16 May 1943, the first encounter between the Boomerang and Japanese aircraft occurred; while on aerial patrol duties a pair of Boomerangs, flown by Flying Officer Johnstone and Sergeant Stammer, spotted three Mitsubishi G4M 'Betty' bombers and opened fire upon them at 250 yards, resulting in little apparent damage and the enemy's withdrawal. On the evening of 20 May 1943, Flight Lieutenant Roy Goon became the first Boomerang pilot to scramble on the Australian mainland against Japanese bombers. Goon, part of a No. 85 Squadron detachment at RAAF Learmonth, near Exmouth, Western Australia, undertaking air defence of the Allied naval base at Exmouth Gulf (codenamed "Potshot"), took off to intercept Japanese bombers. After Goon had sighted them, the bombers dropped their payloads wide of their target and left the area. The majority of standing patrols were uneventful.

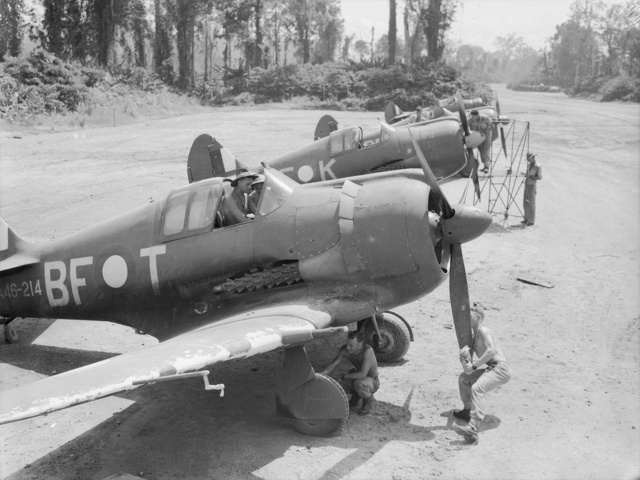
Several Boomerangs of No. 5 Squadron at Piva Airfield, Bougainville, January 1945

No. 84 Squadron had been deployed to a US Army Air Forces bomber base on Horn Island off the coast of Northern Australia in a measure to address Japanese air raids and the continuing shortage of fighters in this area, which were required for an intended small scale offensive in New Guinea. The squadron was only modestly successful in this role. The Boomerang's low top speed and poor high altitude performance meant that No. 84 could drive off enemy attacks, but could rarely get close enough to Japanese aircraft to attack them. There were not many air raids in this area, and after using Boomerangs for eight months, No. 84 Squadron upgraded to the Kittyhawk. In addition to its air defence operations, No. 84 also provided cover for all shipping in the area during this time, including within 20 miles of Merauke, Papua Province.

While the Boomerang was never recorded by the RAAF as having destroyed any enemy aircraft, the type proved to be more useful as a light ground attack aircraft used by Army co-operation squadrons, often replacing the lightly armed Wirraway in this role. In this vital mission, the Boomerang directly contributed to the extensive ground war in the jungles of the South West Pacific theatre, which was often characterised by widely dispersed, small unit actions, which typically fought at close quarters and with uncertain front lines. In addition to strafing Japanese ground forces with cannon and machine gun fire, Boomerangs often dropped smoke bombs to mark targets for other units to attack. The aircraft was also used for artillery spotting, aerial supply drops, tactical reconnaissance, and anti-malarial spraying.

The aircraft proved to be ideal in the ground attack role: it had the range to go wherever it was needed when it was based close to ground operations, had heavy armament, was agile and easy to fly so that pilots could get close to ground targets and avoid ground fire and rough terrain, and had extensive armour-plating and a wood and aluminium airframe that could withstand significant battle damage. Some of the aircraft were shot down, including two from friendly fire by US forces, and many were damaged during accidents while landing, often because the Boomerang was prone to ground looping.

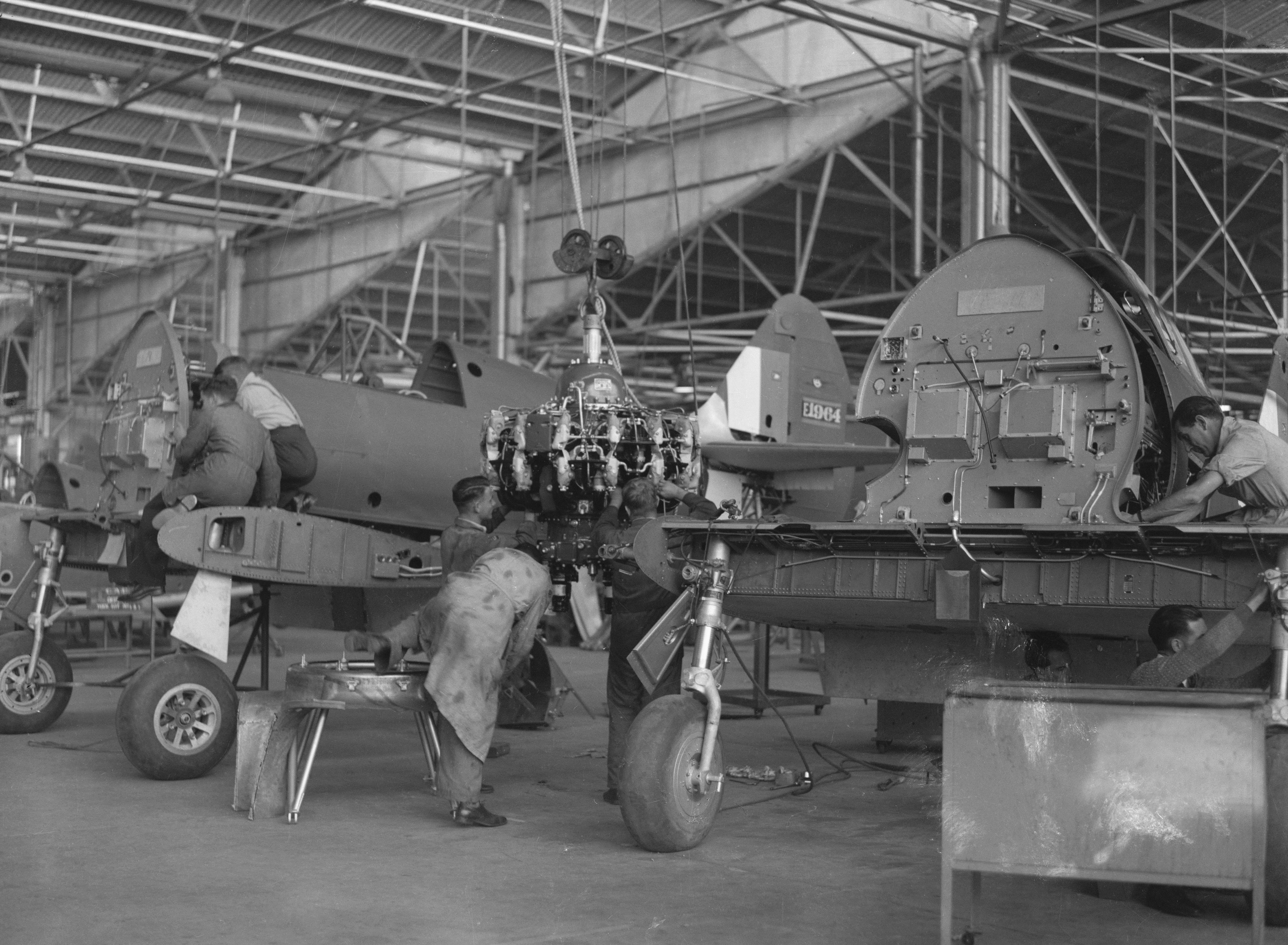
A CAC Boomerang during assembly

No. 4 Squadron and No. 5 Squadron flew Boomerangs in New Guinea, the Solomon Islands Campaign and Borneo Campaign, also in the close support role, with marked success. Flying in pairs (one to observe the ground, the other to observe the air around them), their tasks included bombing, strafing, close infantry support and artillery spotting. When attacking larger enemy formations, Boomerangs often operated in conjunction with larger aircraft. In this role, the Boomerang would get in close to confirm the identity of the target and mark it with a 20 lb (9 kg) smoke bomb, with the bomber then delivering the major ordnance from a safer distance. A partnership between No. 5 Squadron Boomerangs and Royal New Zealand Air Force Corsair fighter-bombers during the Bougainville Campaign was said to be particularly effective.

On 15 August 1945 Japan surrendered; on 14 August the wartime role of the Boomerang had ended when the suspension of all offensive operations against land targets, except for direct support of Allied ground forces in contact with the enemy, was issued.

No. 8 Communications Unit operated a number of Boomerangs to assist with air-sea rescue operations in New Guinea.

The sole CA-14A was used for research by No. 1 Aircraft Performance Unit RAAF, and was also seconded to the Bureau of Meteorology for a period after the war ended.

== Variants ==
CA-12 (Mark I)
The first single-seat fighter version, 105 built.
CA-13 (Mark II)
Improved version of the CA-12, 95 built.
CA-14
One aircraft fitted with a turbo-supercharged engine; did not enter production. Serial number A46-1001.
CA-14A
The CA-14 prototype was later modified to have a square tail and rudder.
CA-19
Tactical reconnaissance variant with a single vertical camera in the fuselage; 49 built. Serial numbers: A46-201 to A46-249.

== Operators ==
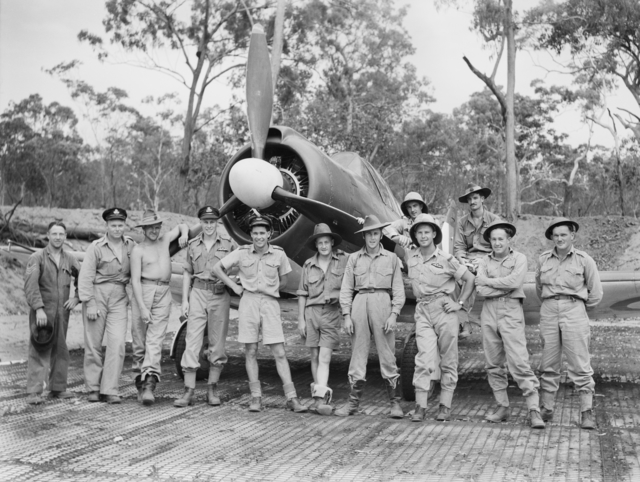
Pilots of No. 83 Squadron RAAF in front of a Boomerang, November 1943

Australia

- Royal Australian Air Force
  - No. 2 Operational Training Unit (October 1942 – 1945)
  - No. 4 Squadron (August 1943 – August 1945). Code letters: QE
  - No. 5 Squadron (November 1943 – August 1946). Code letters: BF
  - No. 83 Squadron (September 1943 – August 1945). Code letters: MH
  - No. 84 Squadron (April 1943 – October 1943). Code letters: LB
  - No. 85 Squadron (May 1943 – January 1945). Code letters: SH
  - No. 8 Communications Unit (February 1944 – August 1944). Code letters: ZA

== Surviving aircraft ==
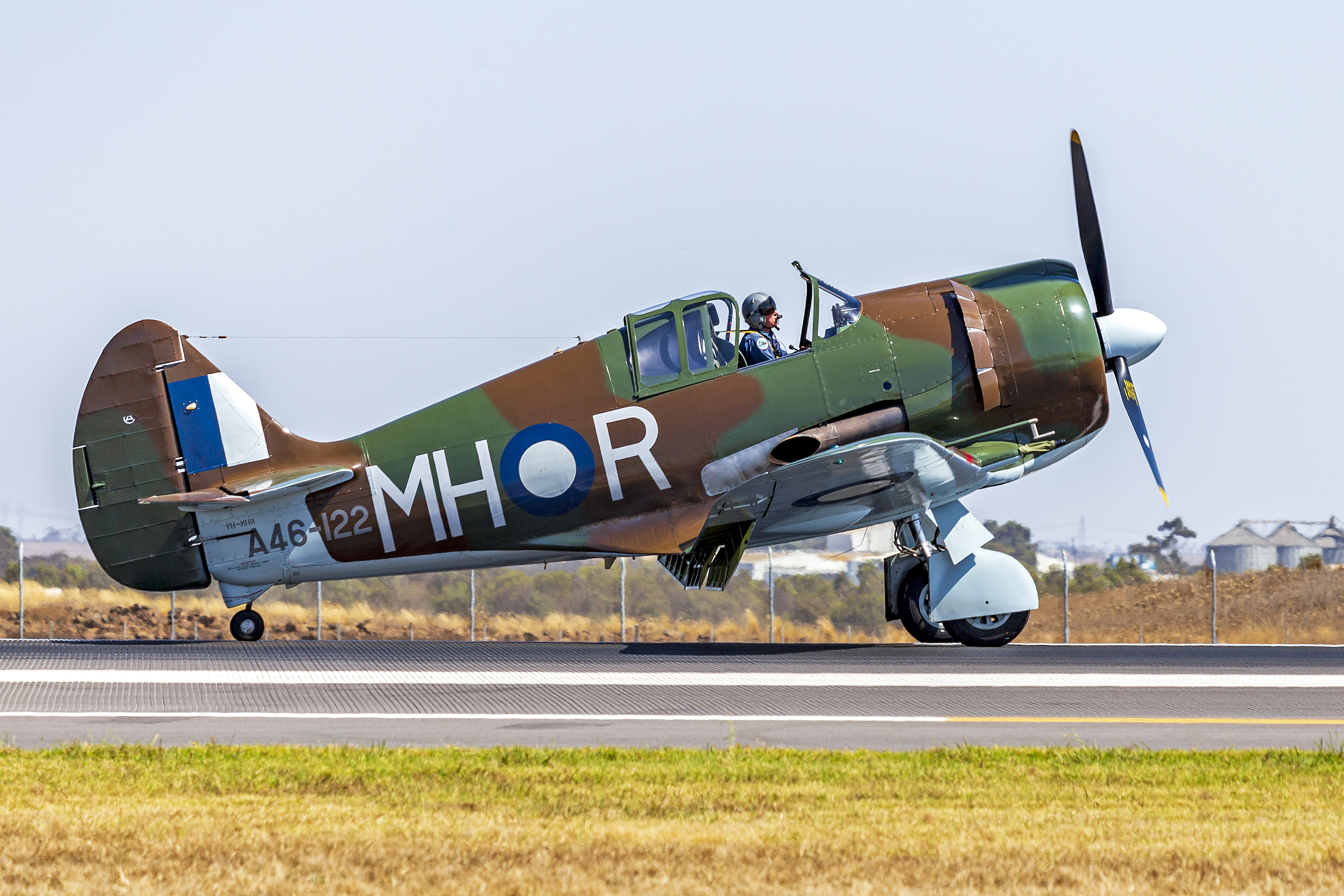
CA-13, A46-122, operated by the Air Force Heritage Squadron

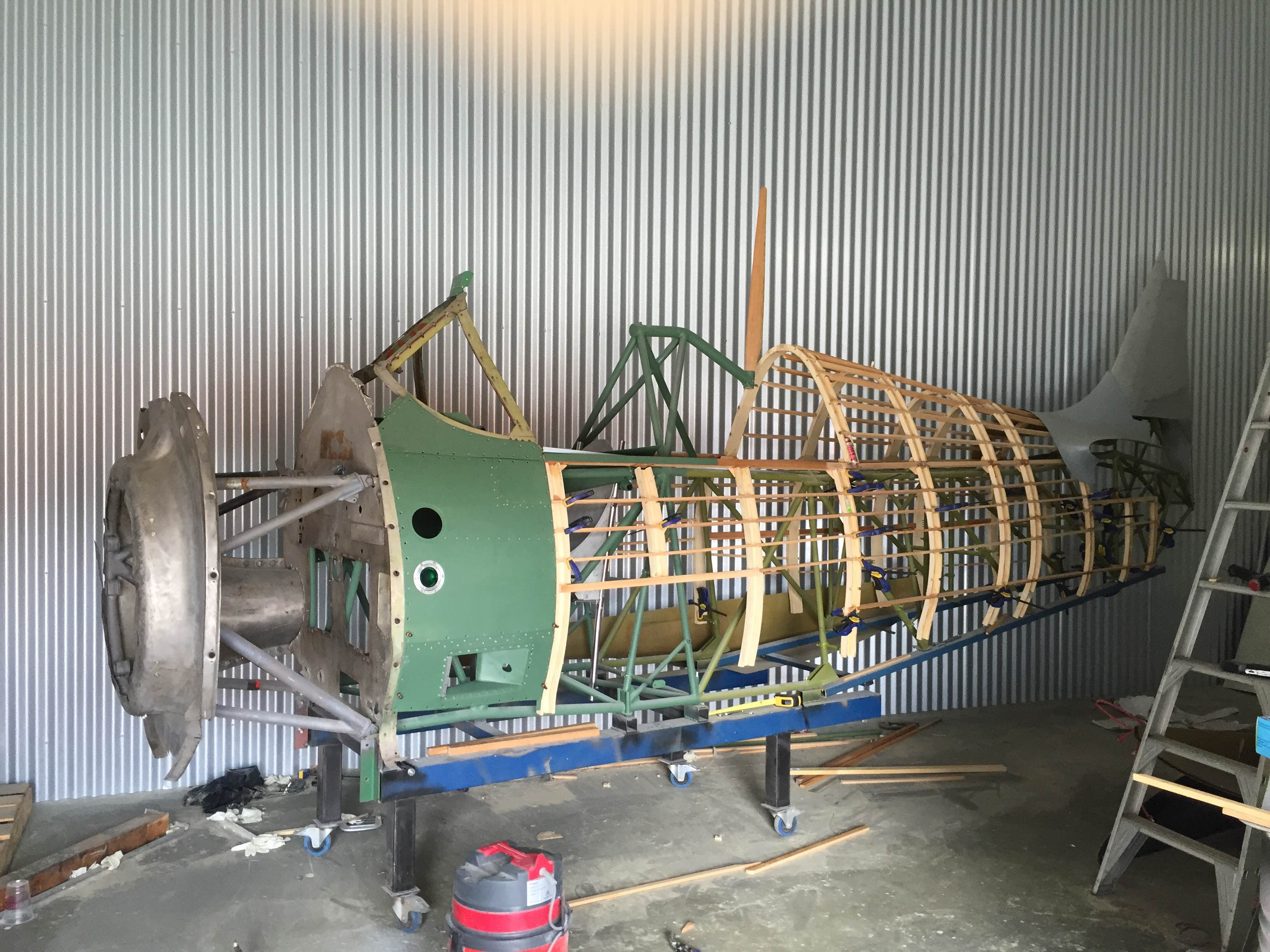
Fuselage of a Boomerang under restoration

- A46-30 – CA-12 on static display at the RAAF Museum in Point Cook.
- A46-54 – "Wizard of Aussie" CA-12 airworthy with (Greg Batts) of Brisbane, Queensland. Registered as VH-MHB It first flew again on 13 Mar 2026 from Toowoomba Regional Airport.
  Airworthy CA-12 VH-MHB at Caboolture Airport Queensland, Australia
- A46-55 – CA-12 under restoration to airworthy with Combat Aircraft Constructions (Greg Batts) of Brisbane, Queensland.
- A46-63 – CA-12 airworthy with Boomerang Aviation Pty of Mile End South, South Australia. It first flew again on 26 June 2009. The restoration includes the provision of a passenger seat.
- A46-77 – CA-12 under restoration to airworthy with Rotorworks Pty Ltd in Mareeba.
- A46-89 – CA-12 under restoration to airworthy with Ian Baker in Sydney.
- A46-90 – CA-12 under restoration to airworthy with Ian Baker in Sydney, New South Wales.
- A46-122 "Suzy Q" – CA-13 airworthy at the Temora Aviation Museum in Temora, New South Wales. Ownership was transferred to the RAAF in July 2019 and it is operated by the Temora Historic Flight of the Air Force Heritage Squadron.
- A46-139 "Phooey" Airworthy, private owner based in Belgium(Registration N32CS out of Antwerp), this aircraft was rebuilt out of several airframes.
- A46-140 – CA-13 under restoration to airworthy with Ian Baker in Sydney, New South Wales.
- A46-147 "Zoot" – CA-13 under restoration to static with Nick Knight in Hoppers Crossing.
- A46-206 "Milingimbi Ghost" – CA-19 on static display at the Museum of Australian Army Flying in Oakey, Queensland. It was previously owned by Lynette Zuccoli in Toowoomba.
- Replica – Airworthy replica of an unknown variant, private owner based in the Netherlands. It was built using parts from the original A46-139. Previously registered in the United States as N32CS.

== Specifications (CA-12) ==
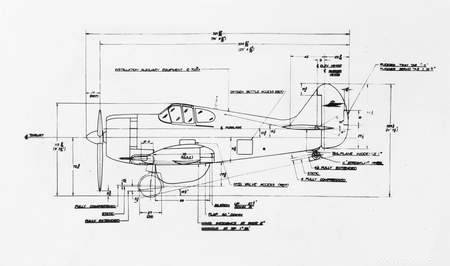
Drawing of Boomerang side view

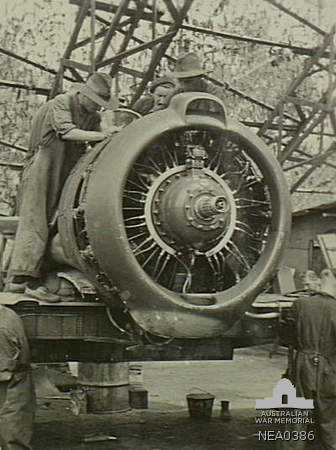
A Boomerang of No. 5 (Tactical Reconnaissance) Squadron RAAF undergoing an inspection

Data from The Great Book of Fighters and The Commonwealth Boomerang.

General characteristics

- Crew: 1
- Length: 25 ft 6 in (7.77 m)
- Wingspan: 36 ft 0 in (10.97 m)
- Height: 9 ft 7 in (2.92 m)
- Wing area: 225 sq ft (20.9 m^{2})
- Empty weight: 5,373 lb (2,437 kg)
- Gross weight: 7,699 lb (3,492 kg)
- Powerplant: 1 × Pratt & Whitney R-1830 Twin Wasp 14-cylinder air-cooled radial piston engine, 1,200 hp (890 kW)
- Propellers: 3-bladed constant-speed propeller

Performance

- Maximum speed: 305 mph (491 km/h, 265 kn) at 15,500 ft (4,724 m)
- Range: 930 mi (1,500 km, 810 nmi)
- Service ceiling: 29,000 ft (8,800 m)
- Rate of climb: 2,940 ft/min (14.9 m/s)
- Wing loading: 34.2 lb/sq ft (167 kg/m^{2})
- Power/mass: 0.16 hp/lb (0.26 kW/kg)

Armament

- Guns:
  - 2 × 20 mm (0.787 in) Hispano or CAC autocannons
  - 4 × 0.303 in (7.7 mm) Browning machine guns
- Bombs: provision for a bomb, when the large ventral drop tank was not carried

== See also ==
External videos
- Narrated video of a CAC Boomerang performing a flight display in New Zealand

Related development

- CAC Wirraway

Aircraft of comparable role, configuration, and era

- Bloch MB.150
- Brewster F2A Buffalo
- Curtiss P-36 Hawk
- Curtiss-Wright CW-21
- FFVS J 22
- Mitsubishi A6M Zero
- Nakajima Ki-43
- North American P-64
- VL Myrsky
- Polikarpov I-16
- Vultee P-66 Vanguard

Related lists

- List of aircraft of the Royal Australian Air Force
- List of aircraft of World War II
- List of fighter aircraft
