= Confessions of a Thug =

Confessions of a Thug may refer to:

- Confessions of a Thug (novel), an 1839 novel by Philip Meadows Taylor about Indian Thuggee leader Thug Behram
- Confessions of a Thug (film), a 2005 American hip-hop film

== See also ==
- Thug (disambiguation)
