= Goonies (disambiguation) =

The Goonies is a 1985 film produced by Steven Spielberg.

Goonies may also refer to:

- The Goonies: Original Motion Picture Soundtrack, the soundtrack to the film
- The Goonies (Famicom video game), a video game for the Family Computer
- The Goonies (MSX video game), a video game for MSX home computers
- The Goonies (Datasoft video game), a 1985 video game by Datasoft
- San Jose Earthquakes, an American professional soccer team based in San Jose, California, USA; which carried the nickname "The Goonies"

== See also ==
- Albatross or goonie birds, a family of birds
- Goon (disambiguation)
- Gooney (disambiguation)
