= No. 85 Squadron RAAF =

Royal Australian Air Force squadron

- Active: 1943–1945
- Country: Australia
- Branch: Royal Australian Air Force
- Type: Fighter
- Role: Home defence
- Engagements: World War II

Insignia
- Squadron code: SH

No 85 Squadron was a Royal Australian Air Force (RAAF) fighter squadron which provided air defence to Western Australia during World War II. It was formed in 1943 and disbanded in 1945. The squadron did not see combat during the war, although it attempted to intercept Japanese aircraft on several occasions in 1943, without success.

== History ==
No. 85 Squadron was formed at RAAF Station Guildford near Perth on 12 February 1943. It was initially equipped with six obsolete Brewster Buffalo fighters as no better aircraft were available. On 30 April, the squadron received 11 more modern and Australian-designed Boomerangs which were operated alongside the Buffalos. Following the arrival of its Boomerangs, No. 85 Squadron began intensive flight training. During the first month of operations nine Boomerangs were involved in accidents and one of the squadron's pilots was killed. In addition to its air defence responsibilities, the squadron was also tasked with refueling and maintaining civilian aircraft which passed through Perth as the city did not have a civil airport at the time.

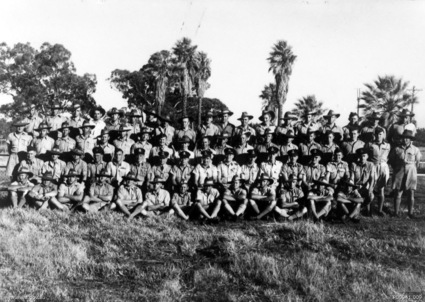
Members of No. 85 Squadron in March 1943

On 30 April 1943, the same day as it received its Boomerangs, No. 85 Squadron established a detachment of six of these aircraft at the 'Potshot' air base at Exmouth Gulf to protect the United States Navy submarine support facilities there. This detachment replaced No. 76 Squadron, which was deployed to New Guinea. On the night of 20 May two Boomerangs attempted to intercept two Japanese bombers, but did not make contact; the Japanese aircraft dropped their bombs into Exmouth Gulf. The next night two Boomerangs were scrambled to intercept three Japanese aircraft which had overflown the airstrip; while one of the Australian pilots believed that he sighted the exhaust flames of a Mitsubishi G4M "Betty" bomber, he was unable to intercept it as his aircraft ran low on fuel. Another attempt to intercept hostile aircraft in July was also unsuccessful, and the squadron did not see combat during the war. On 30 September 1943 No. 85 Squadron was ordered to make an emergency deployment to Derby in anticipation of a Japanese incursion into the Indian Ocean. Four Boomerangs arrived there on 1 October and another nine arrived the next day. The Japanese vessels did not enter the Indian Ocean, and this deployment came to an end on 13 October when the aircraft returned to 'Potshot'.

In January 1944 No. 85 Squadron's last Buffalos were retired. The squadron made another emergency deployment to Derby in February, and 18 Boomerangs operated from the town's airstrip from 17 to 26 February when they returned to Guildford. Further deployments to Derby were made between 6 April and 13 April, 14 April to 1 May and on 12 May. During its periods at Derby, the squadron's aircraft were used to protect a seaplane base which was periodically established at Yampi Sound to support RAAF and United States Navy minelaying attacks on Balikpapan in Borneo.

No. 85 Squadron began to be re-equipped with Spitfire Mark V aircraft in September 1944. Exercises were undertaken with other air units in Western Australia, and the squadron's last Boomerangs left the unit on 12 January 1945. While all of the RAAF's other Spitfire-equipped fighter squadrons were reequipped with the superior Mark VIII Spitfires during 1944 and 1945, No. 85 Squadron retained its Mark Vs until it was disbanded. On 11 May the squadron was ordered to move to RAAF Station Pearce, and this transfer was completed five days later. On 7 July No. 85 Squadron escorted the aircraft carrying the remains of Prime Minister John Curtin to Perth from Canberra following his death. Following the end of the war the squadron conducted a formation flight over Perth as part of the city's victory pageant and continued training flights until 20 September when all flying officially ceased. No. 85 Squadron was disbanded on 29 November.
