= Goon =

Goon may refer to:

== People ==
- Bill Irwin (wrestler), briefly known by the ring name "The Goon"
- Roy Goon (1913–1999), Australian pilot
- Tuli Goon (born 1988), Indian soccer player
- Yang Goon (born 1979), South Korean entertainer
- Goon, a guard in a prisoner of war camp (British World War II usage)
- Goon, a hired thug in a goon squad
- Goon, participant in gooning (kidnapping)

== Media, arts and entertainment ==
=== Books and comics ===
- The Goon, comic book series created by Eric Powell
- One of a fictional race of creatures living on Goon Island in the Popeye cartoon series (see Alice the Goon)
- Mr Goon, oafish local policeman in Enid Blyton's Five Find-Outers series of children's books

=== Radio, film and TV ===
- Goon (film), a 2011 comedy film starring Seann William Scott
  - Goon: Last of the Enforcers, a 2017 sequel, also starring Seann William Scott
- The Goon Show, a British radio comedy programme
- "The Goons" (The Amazing World of Gumball), a television episode
- Goon, a Terrakor from the cartoon Robotix

=== Music ===
- Goon (album), by Tobias Jesso Jr., 2015
- Goon, a 1996 album by Global Goon
- "Goon", a song by Seaway from Colour Blind
- "Goon", a song by Osees from their 2023 album Intercepted Message
- "The Goon Drag," instrumental tune recorded 1941 by Sammy Price and His Texas Bluesicians

== Organizations ==
- Guardians of the Oglala Nation, an American paramilitary group during the early 1970s
- Guild of One-Name Studies, a UK-based charitable organisation

== Places ==
- Rangiora, Waimakariri, Canterbury, South Island, New Zealand; carrying the local nickname "Goon", from shortening of the town nickname "Rangoon"
  - Rangiora High School, Rangiora, New Zealand; nicknamed "Goon High School", from the nickname of the town

== Sports ==
- An enforcer (ice hockey)

== Other uses ==
- Alternative name for the character in "Kilroy was here"-style graffiti
- Goons, members of the Something Awful user forums
- Box wine, known as "goon" in Australian slang
- Gooning, a sexual practice

== See also ==
- Gooners, Arsenal F.C. supporters, a derivative of the team's nickname, the "Gunners"
- Go-on, a possible way of reading certain Japanese Kanji
- Go On (disambiguation)
- Gooney (disambiguation)
- Goonies (disambiguation)
- Goon Squad (disambiguation)
