= CAC CA-15 =

Australian World War II-era prototype fighter aircraft

CA-15
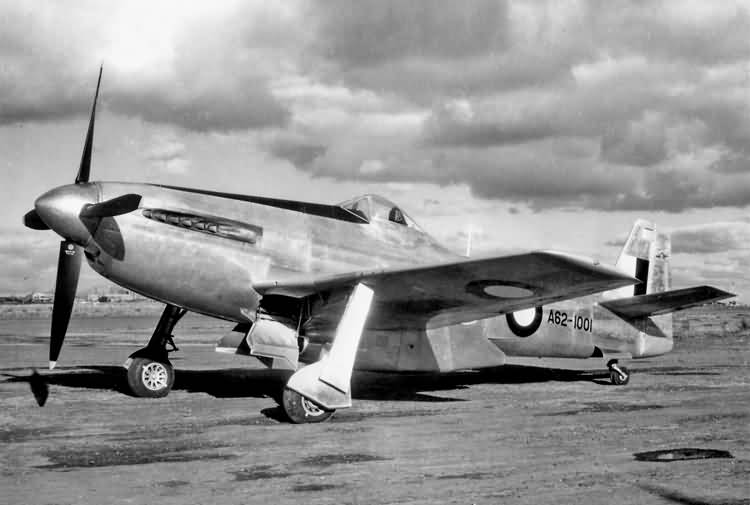

General information
- Type: Fighter
- National origin: Australia
- Manufacturer: Commonwealth Aircraft Corporation
- Status: Scrapped
- Primary user: Royal Australian Air Force
- Number built: 1

History
- First flight: 4 March 1946
- Retired: 1950

The CAC CA-15 was an Australian propeller-driven fighter aircraft designed and built by the Commonwealth Aircraft Corporation (CAC) during World War II. Due to protracted development, the project was not completed until after the war, and was cancelled after flight testing, when the advent of jet aircraft was imminent.

== Design and development ==
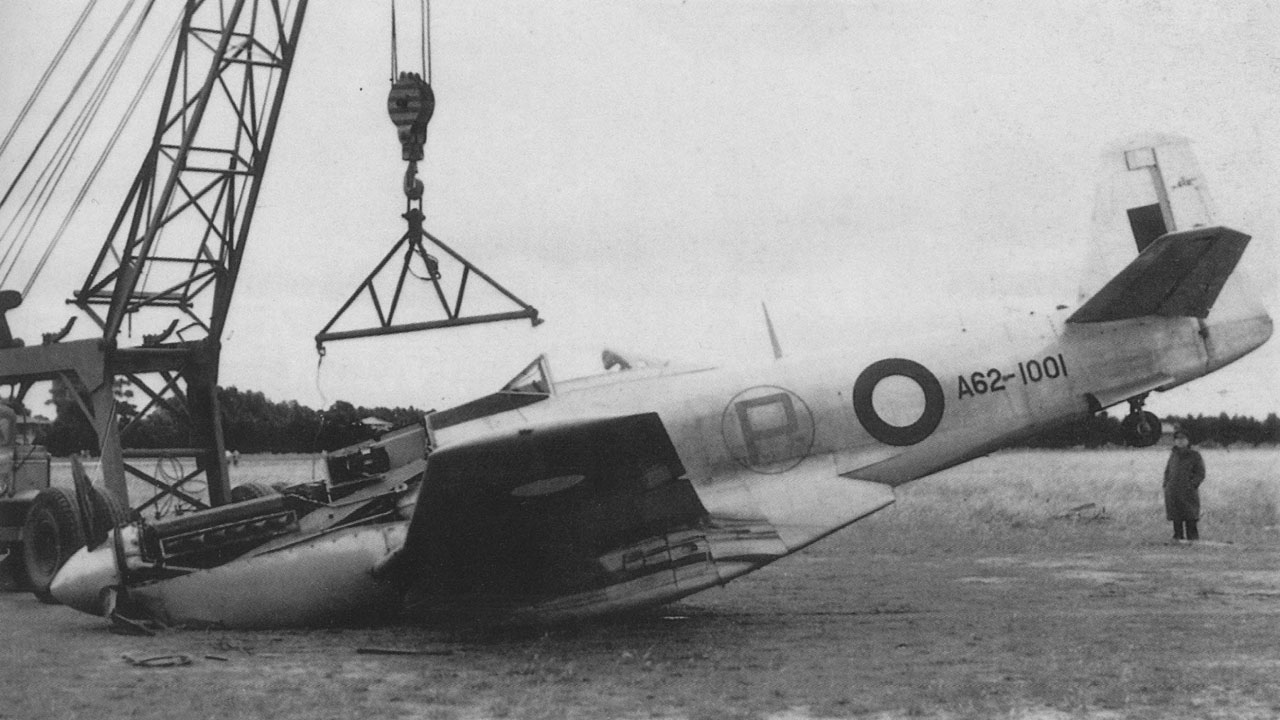
The CA-15 after crash landing at RAAF Point Cook

During 1943, following its success in rapidly designing and mass-producing the Boomerang fighter for the Royal Australian Air Force (RAAF), CAC began design work on a fully-fledged interceptor and escort fighter. Because the Boomerang had become more and more obsolete against Japanese fighters like the Mitsubishi A6M Zero, Sir Lawrence Wackett (as head of CAC) proposed designing a new high-performance fighter from scratch. Fred David, who had designed the Boomerang, was to lead an in-house design team at CAC. In June 1943, the design concept proposal was approved by the government and RAAF, which issued specification 2/43, enabling work to commence.

The design was inspired by contemporary fighters – especially the German Focke-Wulf Fw 190, details of which were available to the designers through Allied intelligence reports on captured aircraft. Although the CA-15 bore a superficial resemblance to the North American P-51 Mustang, the CAC design was not based directly on the American aircraft and had quite different performance objectives. For much of its development, the CA-15 was designed around radial engines, rather than the inline engines used in fighters like the Mustang. In fact, development of the CA-15 was slowed by a recommendation from Wackett, that CAC build Mustangs under licence, rather than bear the cost of developing a unique design. Nevertheless, it was believed that the CA-15 promised capabilities that would enable it to replace the P-51.

At first, the CAC designers planned to use the 2,300 hp (1,715 kW) radial Pratt & Whitney R-2800, with a turbocharger. However, that engine became unavailable, causing further delays in development, and it was decided to fit an in-line Rolls-Royce Griffon Mk 61 (2,035 hp/1,517 kW). Engines for a prototype were leased from Rolls-Royce. It was intended that any production engines would have a three-stage supercharger.

== Operational history ==
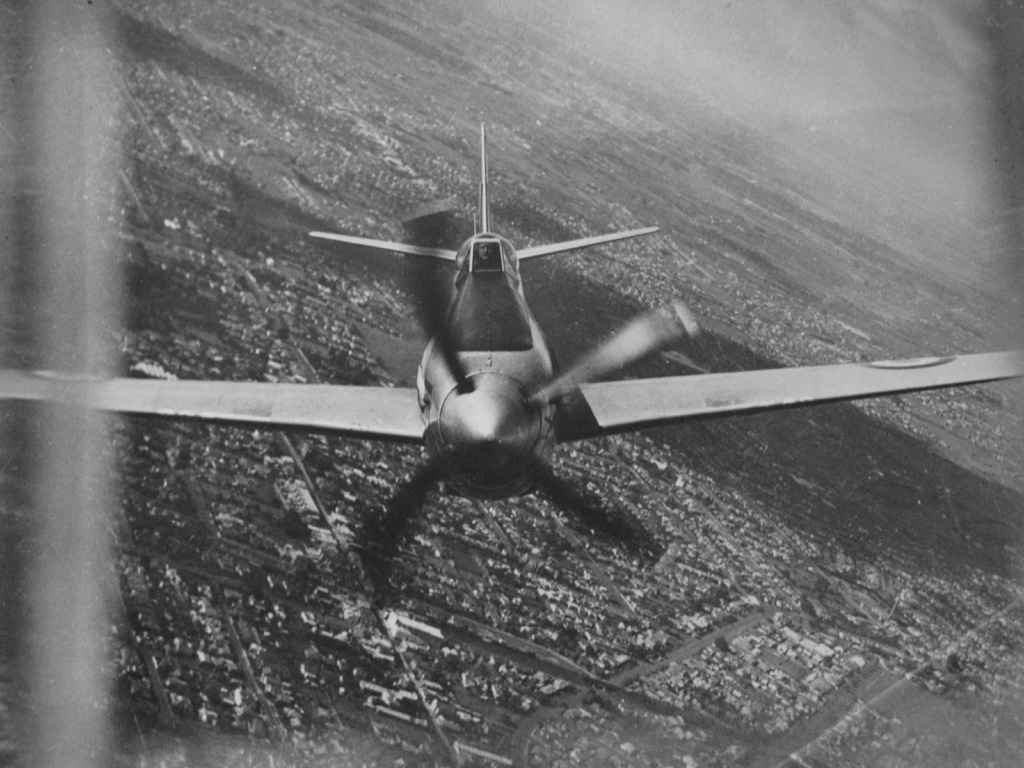
The CA-15, piloted by Flt Lt J.A.L. Archer, over Melbourne, photographed from the rear turret of an Avro Lincoln bomber

Development was further slowed by the end of the war, with the prototype flying for the first time on 4 March 1946, and was flown by CAC test pilot Jim Schofield, who also flew the first Australian built P-51. The prototype was assigned RAAF serial number A62-1001. According to aviation historian Darren Crick, it achieved a calibrated level flight speed of 448 mph (721 km/h) at 26,400 ft (8,046 m). Test flights came to an abrupt ending when Flt Lt J. A. L. Archer suffered a hydraulic failure (later found to be a leaking ground test gauge) on approach to Point Cook on 10 December 1946, which left him no choice but to orbit and burn off fuel. The main gear was only halfway down and unable to be retracted or lowered any further but the tail wheel was down and locked. On landing, the tail wheel struck the airstrip first causing the aircraft to porpoise and finally, the airscoop dug in. The aircraft settled back on the fuselage and skidded to a stop, heavily damaged. After repairs at CAC, the aircraft was returned to ARDU in 1948. Archer reportedly achieved a speed of 502.2 mph (803 km/h) over Melbourne, after levelling out of a dive of 4,000 ft (1,200 m), on 25 May 1948.

By this time, however, it was clear that jet aircraft had far greater potential and no further examples of the CA-15 were built. The prototype was scrapped in 1950, and the engines were returned to Rolls-Royce.

== Operators ==
Australia

- Royal Australian Air Force

== Specifications ==
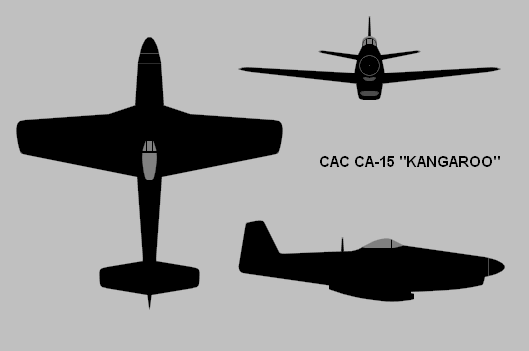
CA-15 3-view drawing

Data from Commonwealth CA-15: The 'Kangaroo' Fighter

General characteristics

- Crew: 1
- Length: 36 ft 7 in (11.15 m)
- Wingspan: 35 ft 6 in (10.82 m)
- Height: 15 ft 7 in (4.75 m)
- Wing area: 253 sq ft (23.5 m^{2})
- Airfoil: NACA 66 series
- Empty weight: 7,540 lb (3,420 kg)
- Gross weight: 9,500 lb (4,309 kg)
- Max takeoff weight: 12,340 lb (5,597 kg)
- Fuel capacity: 220 imp gal (260 US gal; 1,000 L) in two wing tanks + 30 imp gal (36 US gal; 140 L) in one fuselage tank and 2 optional 100 imp gal (120 US gal; 450 L) under-wing drop tanks
- Powerplant: 1 × Rolls-Royce Griffon 61 V-12 liquid-cooled piston engine, 2,035 hp (1,517 kW) with 18 psi (120 kPa) boost
- Propellers: 4-bladed Rotol, 12 ft 6 in (3.81 m) diameter constant-speed propeller

Performance

- Maximum speed: 442 mph (711 km/h, 384 kn) at 25,600 ft (7,800 m) and 368 mph (320 kn; 592 km/h) at sea level
- Range: 1,150 mi (1,850 km, 1,000 nmi) on internal fuel
- Ferry range: 2,540 mi (4,090 km, 2,210 nmi) at 5,000 ft (1,500 m) at 1,600 rpm
- Service ceiling: 34,000 ft (10,000 m)
- Rate of climb: 4,900 ft/min (25 m/s)
- Time to altitude: 20,000 ft (6,100 m) in 5 minutes 30 seconds
- Wing loading: 37.5 lb/sq ft (183 kg/m^{2}) normal load

48.8 lb/sq ft (238.3 kg/m^{2})

- Power/mass: 0.243 hp/lb (0.399 kW/kg)

Armament

- Guns: 6 × 0.5 in (12.7 mm) machine guns
- Rockets: provision for 10 × rockets
- Bombs: 2 × 1,000 lb (450 kg) bombs

== See also ==
Aircraft of comparable role, configuration, and era

- Boeing XF8B
- Fisher P-75 Eagle
- Grumman F8F Bearcat
- Hawker Sea Fury
- Kawasaki Ki-100
- Lavochkin La-9
- Martin-Baker MB5
- Republic XP-72
- Supermarine Spiteful

Related lists

- List of fighter aircraft
