= Gon (video game) =

1994 video game

- Developer(s): Tose
- Publisher(s): Bandai
- Platform(s): Super Famicom
- Release: JP: November 11, 1994
- Genre(s): Platform
- Mode(s): Single-player

Gon (ゴン) is a side-scrolling platform game for the Super Famicom published by Bandai in 1994. The game is an adaptation of the manga series Gon by Masashi Tanaka, about the daily life of a dinosaur named Gon.

== Plot ==
Like the manga, the game has minimal plot and no dialogue. It advances the story using comic-style cutscenes with a focus on comedic situations Gon gets himself into searching for food, interacting with other animals, or venturing into different ecosystems that make up the prehistoric world.

== Gameplay ==
Gon battling an elephant

Throughout the game, the player encounters various animals that seek to steal food from Gon or kick him out of his napping place. The goal of each level in the game is to track down and defeat a main enemy. The levels are divided into sub-stages that are connected through passageways. The game occasionally switches to a 3D perspective, with Gon having to avoid obstacles such as logs and pits.

Gon has various attacks with which he can attack enemies including a bite, a tail-swipe, and a headbutt. He can also briefly fly by flapping his arms and can occasionally use a special giant bite attack. The game features no health bar, with Gon instead becoming angrier as he takes damage. When Gon becomes too angry, he destroys the planet, resulting in a game over. The game features seven levels and players can save their progress using a four-digit passcode.

== See also ==
- Gon: Baku Baku Baku Baku Adventure, a 2012 video game also based on the Gon manga
