= Gooney bird =

Gooney bird may refer to:

- Albatross or gooney bird
- Douglas C-47 Skytrain or Gooney Bird, a military transport aircraft developed from the civilian Douglas DC-3 airliner
- Gooney Bird character in The "Hard Luck Bears" animatronic show: see Aaron Fechter

== See also ==
- Gooney Bird Greene, the first of a series of children's novels
- Gooney Bird and the Room Mother, a children's novel
- Goonies (disambiguation)
- Goon (disambiguation)
- Bird (disambiguation)
