= Squad (disambiguation) =

A squad is a group of individuals formed for a certain purpose. It is often associated with a small military unit, squad. However, it also relates to a sports team squad, police squad, rescue squad, and others. The number of people may vary around 10.

Squad may also refer to:

== Organizations ==
- Squad (company), a Mexican company that developed the video game Kerbal Space Program
- The Squad (Irish Republican Army unit), a unit founded in 1919 by Michael Collins
- The Squad (United States Congress), a nickname for seven progressive members of the U.S. House of Representatives
- The Squad, a nickname for the informal security grouping between the United States, Australia, Japan and the Philippines.

== Film and television ==
- The Squad (1981 film), an Australian television film
- The Squad (2011 film), a Colombian horror film
- The Squad (2015 film), a French action film
- Squad (film), a 2021 Indian action film
- The Squad (TV series), a 1980 British teen drama series

== Other media ==
- Squad (app), a social-media app acquired by Twitter
- Squad (video game), a 2020 first-person shooter
- Squad, 2021 young adult graphic novel by Maggie Tokuda-Hall
- The Squad, a 1990 novel by David Sherman
- The Squad, a superhero team in the Malibu Comics Ultraverse

== See also ==
- Death squad, an armed group that conducts extrajudicial killings or forced disappearances
- Hit Squad (disambiguation)
- Police car, also known as squad car
- Rescue squad, a unit that performs technical rescues and other emergency services
- Squadron (disambiguation)
- Clique (friend group), sometimes called a squad in slang
- Sports team, in the context of sports, often called a squad
