= No. 83 Squadron RAAF =

Royal Australian Air Force squadron

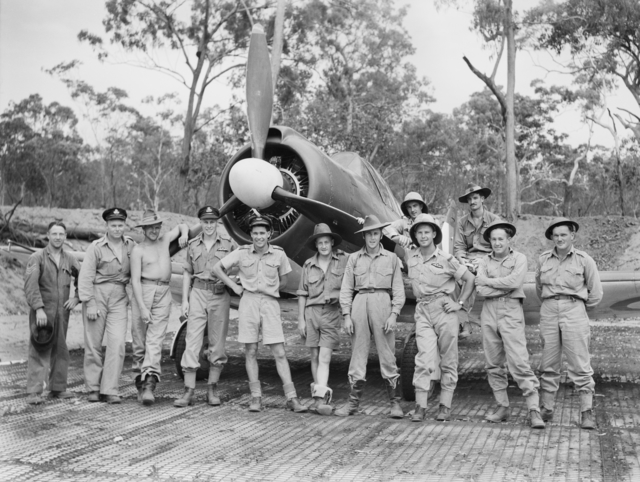
- No. 83 Squadron pilots with a Boomerang fighter in November 1943
- Active: 1943–1945; 2021–current
- Country: Australia
- Branch: Royal Australian Air Force
- Type: Fighter (1943–1945); Intelligence (2021–current)

Insignia
- Squadron code: MH

Aircraft flown
- Fighter: P-39 Airacobra (February–September 1943); Boomerang (June 1943 – September 1945)
- Trainer: Moth Minor

No. 83 Squadron is a Royal Australian Air Force intelligence unit. It was originally formed in 1943 as a 'home defence' fighter squadron and provided air defence to several locations in Queensland, the Northern Territory and New South Wales before being disbanded in 1945. The squadron was re-raised in 2021, and is responsible for a system which integrates intelligence from multiple sources.

== History ==
=== World War II ===
No. 83 Squadron was formed at Strathpine, Queensland, on 26 February 1943. Its role was to intercept unidentified and hostile aircraft, ships and submarines in the Brisbane area. The squadron was initially equipped with six P-39 Airacobra fighters and had only 10 officers and 27 airmen out of its authorised strength of 27 officers and 310 airmen.

The squadron's first operations were flown over the Brisbane area. While it responded to numerous reports of potentially hostile activity it did not sight any Japanese submarines or aircraft. Most operations were conducted from Petrie while the squadron headquarters remained at Strathpine. The squadron began to be re-equipped with Australian designed and built Boomerang fighters in June and the Airacobras were withdrawn in September. It reached its full strength of 21 Boomerangs and a single Moth Minor in October 1943.

No. 83 Squadron moved from Queensland to the Northern Territory in late 1943. All its aircraft suffered from technical faults when they first arrived at Milingimbi Island and none could be used in operations until December. The squadron was subsequently deployed to Melville Island in December and remained there until January 1944, when it made a further move to RAAF Airfield Gove on the mainland. While at Gove the squadron's Boomerangs escorted Allied shipping and conducted patrols. By this time few Japanese forces were operating in the area and No. 83 Squadron did not see combat.

The squadron left the Northern Territory in mid-1944, and arrived at Camden, New South Wales in August where it continued operations with its Boomerangs. In February 1945 it moved again to Menangle where it was disbanded on 18 September 1945. At least one of the Boomerangs operated by No. 83 Squadron remains in flying condition under private ownership. A further No. 83 Squadron Boomerang has been preserved at the RAAF Museum and the fuselage of another is at the Australian National Aviation Museum.

=== Re-establishment ===
No. 83 Squadron was re-raised on 1 January 2021 from the Distributed Ground Station Australia unit that had formed part of No. 87 Squadron until January 2020. The RAAF had begun development of the Distributed Ground Station Australia system in 2009. The squadron forms part of the Information Warfare Directorate. The Distributed Ground Station is a system which integrates and disseminates intelligence from multiple sources. The squadron is located at RAAF Base Edinburgh in South Australia.
