= CAC Ceres =

CA-28 Ceres
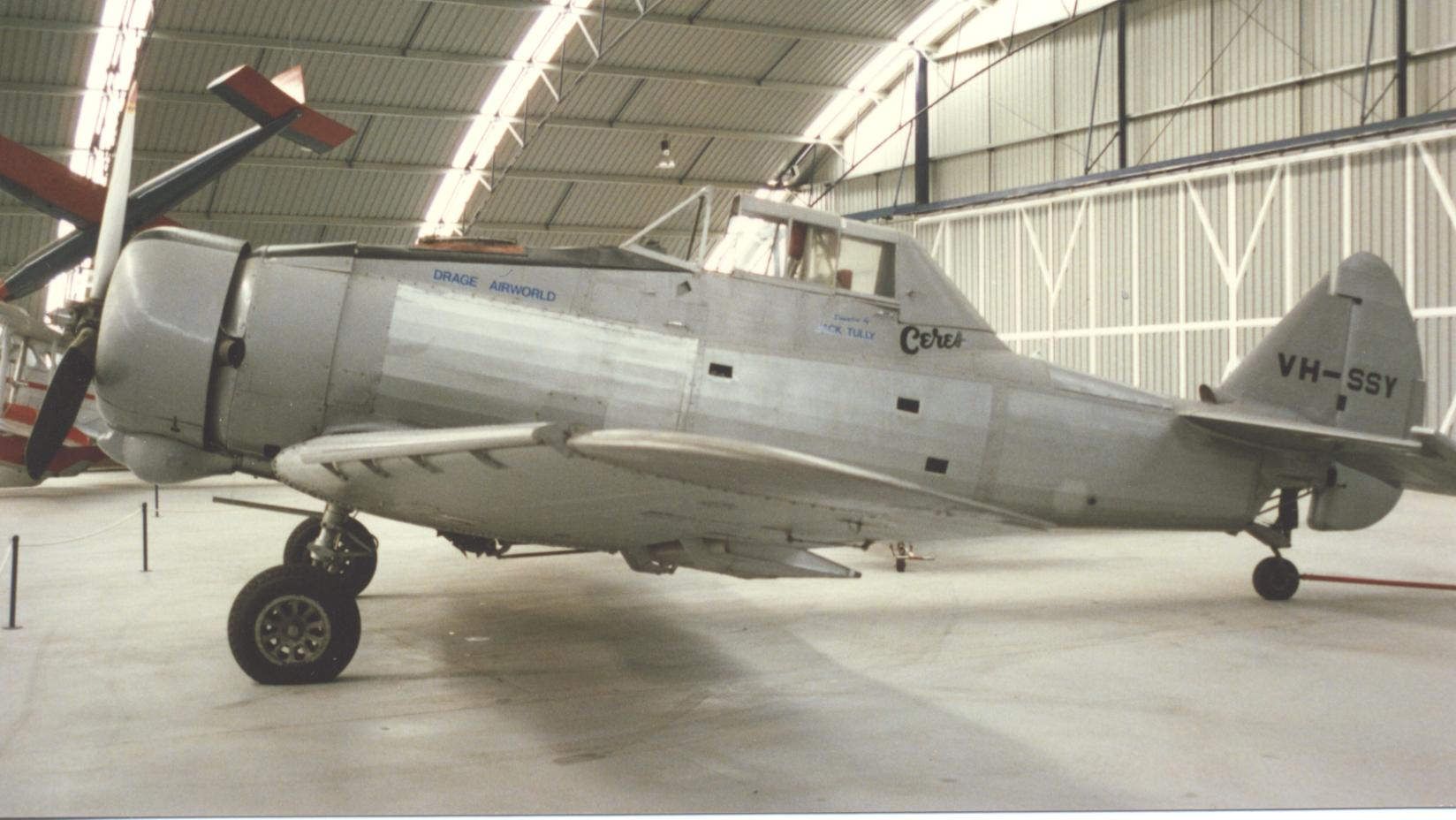
- CA-28 Ceres at Wangaratta, Victoria, in March 1988

General information
- Type: Agricultural aircraft
- Manufacturer: Commonwealth Aircraft Corporation
- Number built: 21

History
- Manufactured: 1959-1963
- Introduction date: 1959
- First flight: 1958 (see Development)
- Developed from: CAC Wirraway

The Commonwealth Aircraft CA-28 Ceres is a crop-duster aircraft manufactured in Australia by the Commonwealth Aircraft Corporation (CAC) between 1959 and 1963. The aircraft was a development of the Wirraway trainer of World War II.

== Development ==
In the 1950s, most crop-dusting aircraft in Australia were conversions of military types that met with varying success. Two CAC types so converted were the Wackett and the Wirraway. Neither type was successful as a crop duster, the Wackett because it was underpowered and the Wirraway because it was not designed for low-level slow-speed flight. Following a market survey conducted together with ICI, CAC determined there was a need for a purpose-built aircraft optimized for agricultural work. Once the board approved the project, a number of surplus Wirraways were purchased from the RAAF for use in the production of this new aircraft.

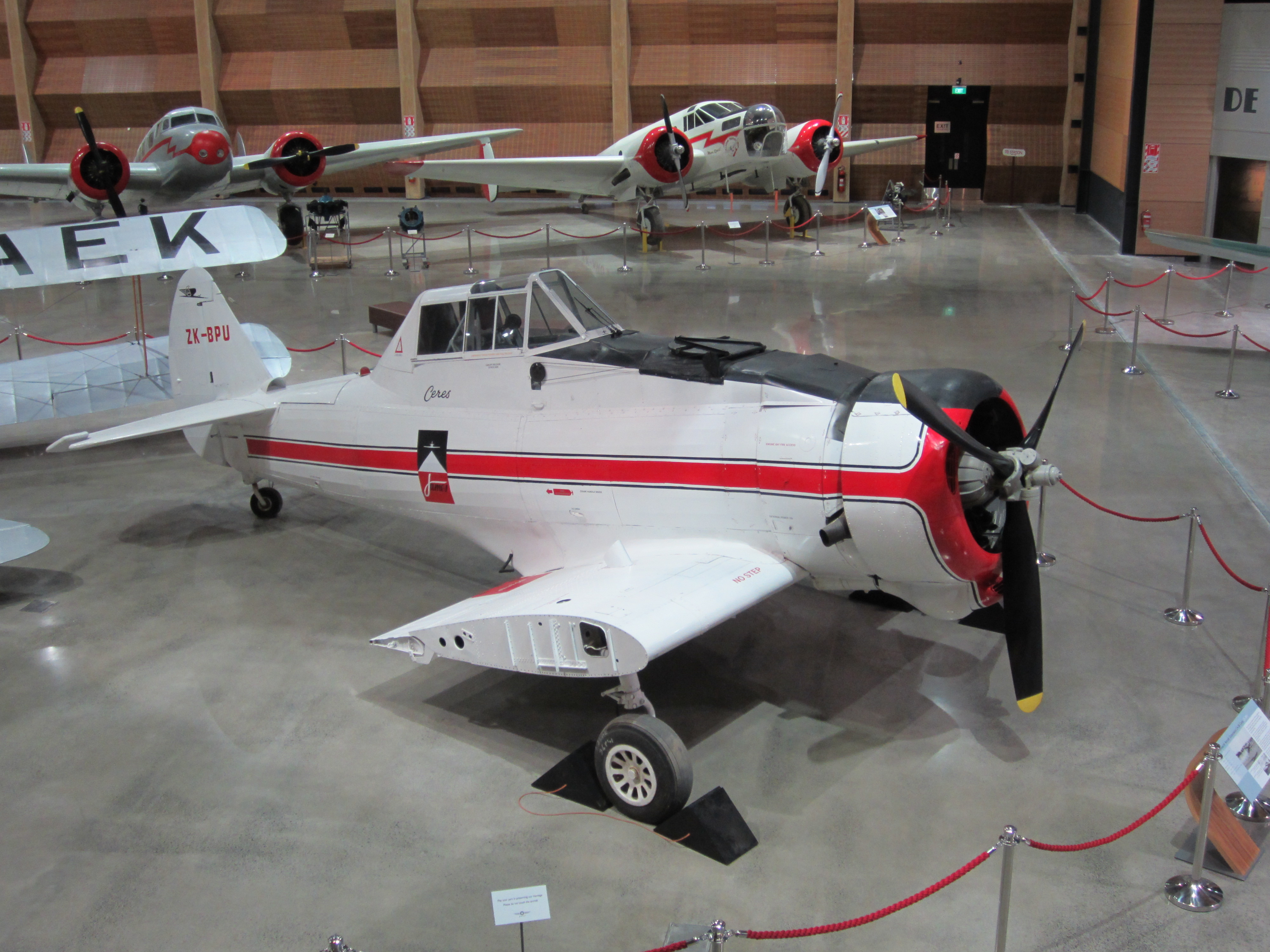
A Ceres on display at the Museum of Transport & Technology, Auckland

The design that emerged, although superficially similar to the Wirraway, was really a new type that used some Wirraway components, rather than a conversion. The only major components used in both types without alteration were the tail group and the landing gear. The fuselage was completely new, with a 41-cubic-foot (1.16 m^{3}) hopper installed between the engine and the high-mounted single-seat cockpit. The Wirraway wing was substantially altered for use in the Ceres. The outer wing panels had slotted trailing-edge flaps and fixed leading edge slats, while the centre-section was substantially altered to accommodate the hopper, the greater weight of the Ceres, the different flaps (the Wirraway had split flaps,) and the new type's fixed landing gear with CAC Mustang main wheels, as opposed to the Wirraway's retractable gear, although the same landing gear legs were used however. The increase in wingspan and wing area of the Ceres compared to the Wirraway was also incorporated in the centre section, and the result was an aircraft with much more docile stalling characteristics than those of the Wirraway. The engine was the same, a Pratt & Whitney R-1340, but altered so that it was direct drive rather than geared as on the Wirraway. The three-bladed variable-pitch propeller was also different, having a wider chord and smaller diameter compared to the Wirraway, to suit the Ceres different operating regime and the direct-drive engine.

The Ceres prototype first flew in February 1958, in the hands of CAC test pilot Bill Scott, and the first production aircraft was delivered in April 1959. After five aircraft had been built, provision was made for a rear-facing seat behind the cockpit, housed under an extended canopy, which was the only major design change during production. The CAC hoped to sell at least fifty aircraft, but production of the Ceres ended in July 1963 after 21 aircraft had been built, although one could be more accurately described as a rebuild, because it was manufactured using parts salvaged from the first aircraft, which had crashed in 1961. The Ceres succumbed to the popularity of more modern and economical designs such as the Piper Pawnee and PAC Fletcher.

Ceres aircraft survive in small numbers, with two still registered to fly in Australia, and examples in museums in Australia and New Zealand, the latter being a survivor of the six Ceres exported to that country. Recently, with the popularity of the Wirraway as a warbird, and the scarcity of Wirraway components, Ceres wings have been "de-converted" for use in Wirraway restorations. However, because of the substantial differences between the two types, that has proved to be troublesome.

== Specifications ==
Data from Sword into Ploughshare, Jane's all the World's Aircraft 1959-60

General characteristics

- Crew: 1
- Capacity: 2,380 lb (1,080 kg) max payload / 40 ft^{3} (1.1 m^{3}) hopper
- Length: 30 ft 9 in (9.36 m)
- Wingspan: 46 ft 11 in (14.3 m)
- Height: 9 ft 0 in (2.74 m)
- Wing area: 312 sq ft (29.0 m^{2})
- Empty weight: 4,400 lb (1,996 kg)
- Gross weight: 6,720 lb (3,048 kg)
- Max takeoff weight: 7,350 lb (3,334 kg)
- Powerplant: 1 × Pratt & Whitney R-1340 S3H1-G 9-cyl. air-cooled radial piston engine, 600 hp (450 kW)
- Propellers: 3-bladed variable-pitch propeller

Performance

- Cruise speed: 105 kn (121 mph, 194 km/h) at4,950 lb (2,250 kg)
- Operating speed: 96.5 kn (111.1 mph; 178.7 km/h) with max payload
- Stall speed: 63.9 kn (73.5 mph, 118.3 km/h) at max AUW
- Ferry range: 450 nmi (520 mi, 830 km) with 80 imp gal (96 US gal; 360 L) fuel
- Rate of climb: 725 ft/min (3.68 m/s) at max AUW
- Take-off to 50 ft (15 m): 2,185 ft (666 m) with max payload
- Landing from 50 ft (15 m): 585 ft (178 m) at 5,500 lb (2,500 kg) AUW

== See also ==
Related development

- CAC Wirraway

Aircraft of comparable role, configuration, and era

- Ayres Thrush
- Cessna 188
- de Havilland Canada DHC-2 Beaver
- Grumman Ag Cat
- PAC Fletcher
- PZL-Mielec M-18 Dromader
- Transavia PL-12 Airtruk
- Zlin Z-37 Cmelak
