= Thug =

Thug or THUG may refer to:

== People ==
- Thug, a criminal, who treats others violently and roughly often for hire
- Thug, a member of gangs that committed thuggee
  - Thug Behram (born c. 1765), a thuggee gang leader
- Young Thug, American rapper and songwriter

== Video game ==
- Tony Hawk's Underground (slang acronym), a video game

== Film and literature ==
- Thug (film), a 2024 film starring Liam Neeson
- Thugs (film), a 2023 Indian Tamil-language action drama film
- The Hate U Give, young adult novel
  - The Hate U Give (film)
- Thug, a Marvel Comics character and member of Technet

== Music ==
=== Performers ===
- Les Thugs, a French punk band
- Mr. Thug, vocalist of the hip hop group Bonde da Stronda
- Bambie Thug, stage name of Bambie Ray Robinson, Irish singer songwriter and Eurovision contestant (born 1994)

=== Albums ===
- T.H.U.G.S. (Bone Thugs-n-Harmony album), 2007
- T.H.U.G.S. (Flesh-n-Bone album), 1996

=== Songs ===
- "Thug", by D-Block Europe, 2019
- "Thug", by Slim Thug from Boss of All Bosses, 2009
- "Thug", by Swans from Cop, 1984
- "Thug", by ZZ Top from Eliminator, 1983
- "T.H.U.G. (Trade)", by Todrick Hall from Forbidden, 2018
- "'T.H.U.G (True Hero Under God)", by Z-Ro from I'm Still Livin', 2006

== See also ==
- Confessions of a Thug (disambiguation)
- Tupac: A Thug Life, a non-fiction anthology released by Plexus Publishing and written by various music writers and authors about the life of Tupac Shakur
