= Hit Squad (disambiguation) =

Hit Squad was a 1990s hip hop collective.

Hit Squad may also refer to:

- A team of hired contract killers, especially within the context of organized crime
- Hit Squad (film), a 1976 crime-comedy film
- Da Hit Squad, a professional wrestling tag team
- Hit Squad, a 2003 novel by James Heneghan
- Hit Squad, a 2012 novel by Sophie McKenzie, winner of the Red House Children's Book Award

== See also ==
- Death squad
