= Masashi Tanaka =

Japanese manga artist (born 1962)

- Born: June 10, 1962 (age 64); Gotsu City, Shimane Prefecture, Japan
- Occupation: Manga artist
- Known for: Gon
- Website: Masashi Tanaka page

Masashi Tanaka (田中 政志, born June 10, 1962) is a Japanese manga artist best known for creating Gon, a silent manga starring a miniature dinosaur.

== Biography ==
Masashi Tanaka was born in Gōtsu, Shimane. He graduated from the Osaka University of Arts in 1985 and published his first manga while still in school. That year he won the Grand Prize in the Kodansha Tetsuya Chiba Awards and moved to Tokyo. He began publishing Gon, his best-known manga, in 1991. Gon won multiple awards in 1998, including the Excellence Award in the Manga division at the second Japan Media Arts Festival in 1998, the Eisner Award for Best U.S. Edition of Foreign Material and Best Humor Publication at the Eisner Awards, and the award for Best French Edition of Foreign Material at the 1998 Manga Festival in France.
