= Gon: Baku Baku Baku Baku Adventure =

Video game for the Nintendo 3DS

- Developer: Inti Creates
- Publisher: Namco Bandai Games
- Platform: Nintendo 3DS
- Release: JP: June 14, 2012; KO: November 30, 2012
- Genres: Action-adventure, platformer
- Mode: Single-player

Gon: Baku Baku Baku Baku Adventure (ゴン バクバクバクバクアドベンチャー, Gon: Baku Baku Baku Baku Adobenchā) is a 2012 action-adventure video game for the Nintendo 3DS based on the Gon manga and its anime adaptation.

== Release ==
Gon: Baku Baku Baku Baku Adventure was released in South Korea on November 30, 2012.

== See also ==
- Gon, a 1994 video game also based on the Gon manga
