= Squadron =

Squadron(s) may refer to:

== Military ==
- Squadron (army), a military unit of cavalry, tanks, or equivalent subdivided into troops or tank companies
- Squadron (aviation), a military unit that consists of three or four flights with a total of 12 to 24 aircraft, depending on the type of aircraft and service
- Squadron (naval), a military unit of three to ten warships that may be part of a larger task group, task force, or a naval fleet; also an administrative unit for warships like submarines that usually operate alone

== Media ==
- "Squadron" (Star Wars: Young Jedi Adventures), an episode of Star Wars: Young Jedi Adventures
- Squadron (TV series), a 1982 BBC television series
- Squadron Supreme, a fictional superhero team appearing in Marvel Comics
- Star Wars: Squadrons, a video game set in the Star Wars universe that simulates spaceship combat

== Other uses ==
- Daniel Squadron (born 9 November 1979), former New York elected official
- Squadron, Ellenoff, Plesent & Sheinfeld, a New York City law firm that practiced from 1970 to 2002
- Squadron Energy, a division of the Australian company Tattarang, owned by billionaire Andrew Forrest

== See also ==
- Squad (disambiguation)
