= Gon (manga) =

Japanese manga series and its franchise

- Second English volume cover (Paradox Press edition), featuring Gon

ゴン
- Genre: Comedy
- Manga
- Written by: Masashi Tanaka
- Published by: Kodansha
- English publisher: NA: Paradox Press (1996–2001); CMX (2007–2009); Kodansha Comics (2011–2012); UK: Mandarin Books (1994)
- Imprint: Wide KC Morning
- Magazine: Morning; (1991–2002); Morning Shin Magnum Zōkan; (1998–1999)
- Original run: September 1991 – March 14, 2002
- Volumes: 7
- Video game

Gon
- Developer: Tose
- Publisher: Bandai
- Genre: Platformer
- Platform: Super Famicom
- Released: JP: November 11, 1994
- Manga

Gon-chan
- Written by: Masashi Tanaka
- Published by: Kodansha
- Magazine: Comic BomBom
- Original run: December 15, 2005 – December 15, 2006
- Manga
- Written by: Masashi Tanaka
- Published by: Kodansha
- Magazine: Monthly Afternoon
- Original run: March 24, 2012 – February 25, 2013
- Anime television series
- Directed by: Kim Gil-Tae (Chief Director)
- Produced by: Ahn Hyun-Dong; Ham Wook-Ho; Osamu Yoshiba
- Written by: Isao Murayama
- Music by: Kim Tae-hoon
- Studio: Daewon Media
- Original network: TXN (TV Tokyo)
- English network: AUS: Boomerang; IN: Cartoon Network; PH: Cartoon Network; SEA: Cartoon Network; SG: Okto
- Original run: April 2, 2012 – September 26, 2015
- Episodes: 76 (120)
- Video game

Gon: Baku Baku Baku Baku Adventure
- Developer: Namco Bandai Games
- Publisher: Bandai
- Genre: Platformer
- Platform: Nintendo 3DS
- Released: JP: June 14, 2012
- icon

Gon (Japanese: ゴン) is a Japanese manga series created by Masashi Tanaka. It was originally serialized in Kodansha's seinen manga magazine Morning and its special editions from September 1991 to March 2002. The series follows the adventures of the titular dinosaur character, Gon. The manga has spawned multiple adaptations, including video games and an anime series.

== Synopsis ==
The manga is about a small dinosaur named Gon and his adventures in the wilderness, long after the Age of the Dinosaurs. A silent comic, the manga makes use of no dialogue or sound effects and follows an episodic format. Each chapter typically follows Gon trying to find something he wants (usually food, sleep, or solitude) and becoming entangled in the lives of other creatures in the surrounding area, with his encounters ranging from friendly to violent. Being unusually strong and invincible, Gon always wins his fights against bigger foes. The manga has very little continuity between chapters.

== Media ==
=== Manga ===
Written and illustrated by Masashi Tanaka, Gon began serialization in Kodansha's seinen manga magazine Morning in September 1991. (Note: Debuted in the magazine's 39th issue of 1991, cover dated September 19.) It was also briefly serialized in the special issue of Morning, Morning Shin Magnum Zōkan (before its rebranding as Evening), in the magazine's fourth to eighth issues, published between 1998 and 1999. It completed serialization on March 14, 2002. (Note: Finished in the magazine's 15th issue of 2002, released on March 14 of that same year.) Its chapters were compiled in seven tankōbon volumes under Kodansha's "Wide KC Morning" imprint, published between March 19, 1992, and March 22, 2002. A compilation volume, titled Gon Selection, was published under Kodansha's "Afternoon KC Deluxe" imprint on August 23, 2012. Also included in the volume is a one-shot story that was published in Evening on May 13, 2003, titled Gon to Yukaina Nakamatachi (ゴンとゆかいな仲間たち; 'Gon and His Cheerful Friends').

Between 1996 and 2000, Paradox Press, a subset of DC Comics, published Gon in North America in eight volumes. Like other English-translated manga at the time, its pages were reversed to read from left-to-right. CMX, another subset of DC Comics, reissued Gon in a seven-volume series from July 31, 2007, to January 27, 2009. Unlike the Paradox Press versions which were reversed for western readers, these stories are printed in the original sequence, and in their original right-to-left format. Kodansha Comics later reprinted the seven-volume series between August 30, 2011, and August 21, 2012. In the United Kingdom, Gon was published in a single volume by Mandarin Books in 1994.

A spin-off manga by Tanaka titled Gon-chan (ゴンちゃん) was serialized in Kodansha's children manga magazine Comic BomBom, starting in the magazine's January 2006 issue, published on December 15, 2005. It completed serialization on December 15, 2006, in the magazine's January 2007 issue.

In February 2012, it was announced in that month's issue of Kodansha's seinen manga magazine Monthly Afternoon that Tanaka will resume Gon in the next magazine's issue in March, coinciding with the anime adaptation's release. Gon was serialized in full color in Monthly Afternoon from March 24, 2012, to February 25, 2013. A 98-page black-and-white one-shot story was later published in the magazine on September 25, 2013.

=== Video games ===
The first video game adaptation of the manga was Gon, a platforming game published by Bandai for the Super Famicom. It was released in Japan on November 11, 1994. Another platformer, Gon: Baku Baku Baku Baku Adventure, was developed for the Nintendo 3DS and released in Japan on June 14, 2012, and later in South Korea by Namco Bandai Games. Gon is also a licensed playable character appearing in the PlayStation port of fighting game Tekken 3.

=== Proposed film ===
In July 2005, it was announced that a computer-generated animated film based on Gon was in development, with Motonori Sakakibara attached to direct and Sprite Animation Studios to produce it as their "first CG animated feature film". It was slated for release in 2007. No other news or activity would come out since then.

=== Anime ===
In June 2008, it was announced during that year's Licensing International Expo that Korean production company Daewon Media had completed a deal with Kodansha to co-produce a computer-generated anime adaptation of Gon for release in early 2010, with pre-production to be completed by the end of 2008. The release date was delayed to late 2011 after the contract for financing its production was not finalized until December 2010. The release date was again delayed to April 2012.

The series was eventually aired in Japan on TX Network from April 2, 2012, to March 25, 2013, for a total of 50 episodes. It featured Motoko Kumai as the voice of Gon, with Kenyu Horiuchi and Yūji Mitsuya in various supporting roles. The anime was renewed for a second season, which aired on TX Network from April 4, 2015, to September 26, 2015, for a total of 26 episodes. The second season was added to Netflix in 2016.

== Reception ==
Gon won multiple awards in 1998, including the Excellence Award in the Manga division at the second Japan Media Arts Festival in 1998, the Eisner Award for Best U.S. Edition of Foreign Material and Best Humor Publication at the Eisner Awards, and the award for Best French Edition of Foreign Material at the 1998 Manga Festival in France.

The manga has been praised for its lack of dialogue or onomatopoeic words, which allows it to be universally understood and appreciated regardless of the reader's background.

== See also ==
- Age of Reptiles (comics) − another silent comic featuring dinosaurs
