= Commonwealth Aircraft Corporation =

Australian aircraft manufacturer (1936–1985)

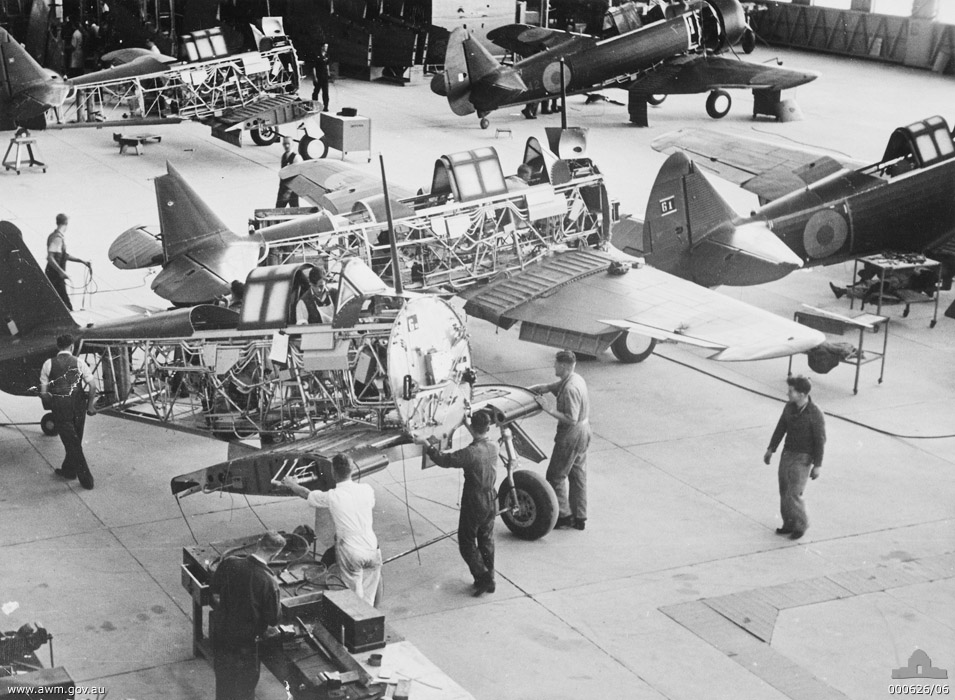
- Wirraway aircraft under construction at the Fishermans Bend factory in 1940
- Type: Private company
- Industry: Aircraft manufacturing
- Incorporated: Australia
- Founded: 17 October 1936
- Founder: Essington Lewis CH
- Defunct: 1985
- Fate: Acquired by Hawker de Havilland
- Headquarters: Fishermans Bend, Melbourne, Victoria, Australia
- Key people: Colin Fraser (Director, 1936– ); Sir Laurence Hartnett CBE (Director, 1935-1947); Essington Lewis CH (Director, 1936– ); W. S. Robinson (Director, 1936– ); Sir Lennon Raws (Director, 1936– ); Lord Harry McGowan (Director, 1936– ); Fred David (Aircraft designer, 1939–c. 1946); Lawrence Wackett (Managing Director, 1936-1960); Herbert Harrison (Director, Technical Services, 1931-1934)
- Products: Aircraft: Aermacchi MB-326; Bell Kiowa OH-58A; Boomerang; Dassault Mirage III; F-86 Sabre; Wackett; Winjeel; Wirraway; Woomera; Aero-engines: Pratt & Whitney R-1340 Wasp and R-1830 Twin Wasp; Rolls-Royce Merlin, Nene, and Avon; Snecma Atar; Bristol Siddeley Viper; General Electric F404; Bus bodies: Bedford OB, SB and VAM 70; VöV-Standard-Bus; MAN SL200
- Owners: BHP; General Motors-Holden; Broken Hill Associated Smelter; Imperial Chemical Industries; Orient Steam Navigation Company; Electrolytic Zinc Company

The Commonwealth Aircraft Corporation (CAC) was an Australian aircraft manufacturer. It was established in 1936 as a private company to provide Australia with the capability to produce military aircraft for use by the Royal Australian Air Force (RAAF) in case foreign aircraft became unavailable in the event of a war.

The company's initial output was centred on the production of the Wirraway, Wackett, Woomera and Boomerang during World War II from a manufacturing plant in Fishermans Bend, Melbourne, Victoria. Post-war, the company manufactured the F-86 Sabre, Winjeel trainer, Dassault Mirage III, Aermacchi MB-326, and rotary aircraft including the Bell Kiowa OH-58A, the last mass production item prior to its trade sale to Hawker de Havilland in 1985. During this time, the CAC was involved in the production of chassis, engines, and parts. From 1951 to 1977, the company also manufactured bus bodies.

Of the four former factory hangars at the Fishermans Bend site, one was relocated interstate in 1943, and two were dismantled in c. 2003 – c. 2004. The third, called the Butler Hangar, was relocated to the airport at Tyabb, on the Mornington Peninsula in the early c. 2000s; and was added to the Victorian Heritage Register on 23 November 2006 in recognition of its rarity and uniqueness, and its historical, architectural and scientific (technical) significance; and was also identified by the Victorian branch of the National Trust on an unknown date for a possible future addition to a non-statutory list.

== History ==
=== Establishment ===
From the mid 1930s it became increasingly evident that the militarisation of Germany, and to a lesser extent Italy, and the militarisation of Japan and its military expansion into China, could lead to global war.

In 1935, the Managing Director of BHP, Essington Lewis, visited Europe and on his return to Australia, concerned at the lack of manufacturing capabilities and at the possibility of aircraft not being available from traditional British sources during wartime, he commenced a lobbying campaign to convince the Australian Government to establish a modern aircraft industry. The government required little persuasion and encouraged negotiations between a number of Australian companies. The outcome of these negotiations, begun in August 1935, was the formation of CAC the following year. Initially the companies involved were BHP, General Motors-Holden and Broken Hill Associated Smelter. These were joined by Imperial Chemical Industries, the Orient Steam Navigation Company and the Electrolytic Zinc Company at the time of CAC's formation (the company was incorporated in Melbourne on 17 October 1936). By September 1937, a factory was completed at Fishermans Bend.

=== World War II ===
Shortly after the establishment of CAC, Mascot-based Tugan Aircraft was purchased. This led to Lawrence Wackett joining the company; he immediately became the General Manager. It is almost entirely due to Wackett's efforts that the Wirraway became the first aircraft produced by CAC. In 1935 Wackett had led a technical mission to Europe and the United States to evaluate modern aircraft types and select a type suitable to Australia's needs and within Australia's capabilities to build. The mission's selection was the North American NA-16; with CAC's modifications this became the Wirraway. CAC also undertook production of the Pratt & Whitney R-1340 engine used in the Wirraway and also built some propellers when supplies from alternative sources became problematic. With its first aircraft type the company thus became one of very few in the world that have produced an aircraft fitted with engines and propellers made by the same company (see also de Havilland).

While CAC largely produced Australian versions of foreign aircraft, it also developed a number of original designs during and after World War II. These indigenous designs include the Wackett, which was only the second type produced by the company. The Wackett was a simple trainer aircraft, but later designs during World War II were the sophisticated Woomera and CA-15, however these types were destined to fly only in prototype form.

=== From the 1950s ===
Post war, CAC diversified into many other areas including housing, bus bodies, saucepans and pressure cookers and other household appliances.

Jet-powered aircraft designs in the 1950s and 1960s did not leave the drawing board. However, in 1951, CAC was given the go-ahead to design and manufacture a version of the F-86 Sabre with a revised engine and armament. The Sabre was developed and produced concurrently with the indigenous Winjeel trainer, with Sabre manufacture coming to an end in 1961.

In 1964 after a large amount of political lobbying CAC began producing components for the Sabre's replacement, a version of the Dassault Mirage III, as a subcontractor to the Government Aircraft Factories (GAF). In 1967 CAC commenced licence production of a version of the Aermacchi MB-326 optimised for Australian conditions, this programme ending in 1972. In 1971 CAC joined the small number of aircraft manufacturers which have built both fixed- and rotary-winged aircraft, when it began production of a variant of the Bell Kiowa for the Australian Army and Royal Australian Navy, the last of these was delivered in 1977. The same year CAC embarked on a Life of Type Extension (LOTEX) programme for the Macchi, which was suffering fatigue problems, until LOTEX expired in 1984.

==== Bus body building ====
To supplement revenue and retain skilled sheet metal workers, CAC produced and bodied buses based on Bedford chassis under the brand name of Comair. CAC major shareholder in the 1950s was General Motors Holden and from 1946 until 1973, Comair produced over 3,600 bus bodies, primarily on Bedford OB, SB and VAM 70 chassis for Victorian operators. Subsequently, General Motors Holden divested its shareholding in CAC and the company signed a licensing agreement to build VöV-Standard-Bus bodies on MAN chassis. It bodied 135 MAN SL200 chassis for ACTION. It resumed production on Bedford chassis in 1977, but only a few were produced.

=== Trade sale ===
CAC became a fully owned subsidiary of Hawker de Havilland in 1985 and was renamed Hawker de Havilland Victoria in 1986. It was purchased by Boeing Australia in 2000.

== Production list ==
During its existence the Commonwealth Aircraft Corporation produced over 1700 aircraft of all types, including prototypes and aircraft assembled locally from imported components. Of these, almost 550 were examples of aircraft types wholly designed by the company. Aircraft were predominately produced for the RAAF and later, for the RAN and civilian operators. Buses produced were predominately for government bus operators.

=== Aircraft design and production ===
The designations used by CAC reflected production or design work in fulfillment of different in-house projects or government contracts rather than different types produced (for instance the different designations for the Wackett and Winjeel prototypes compared to their production versions). Early types were given consecutive manufacturer's construction numbers (c/nos.), while later types (beginning with the production version of the Winjeel) were given c/nos. with the model number as a prefix. Construction numbers 1210 to 1224 appear not to have been assigned. The company designations and construction numbers are:

- CAC Wirraway (trainer and general purposes aircraft)
  - CA-1: first production contract; 40 built (c/nos. 1–40)
  - CA-3: second production contract; 60 built (c/nos. 41–100)
  - CA-5: third production contract; 32 built (c/nos. 103–134)
  - CA-7: fourth production contract; 100 built (c/nos. 135–234)
  - CA-8: fifth production contract; 200 built (c/nos. 436–635)
  - CA-9: sixth production contract; 188 built (c/nos. 636–823)
  - CA-10: proposed variant, not built
  - CA-16: seventh (and final) production contract; 135 built (c/nos. 1075–1209)
  - CA-20: contract to modify for use by the RAN; 17 modified
- CAC Wackett (trainer)
  - CA-2: prototypes; two built (c/nos. 101, 102)
  - CA-6: production contract; 200 built (c/nos. 235–434)
- CAC CA-11 Woomera (prototype medium bomber)
  - CA-4: prototype; one built (c/no. 435)
  - CA-11: production contract for 105 aircraft. Contract cancelled, only one aircraft flew (101 c/nos. assigned, 1225–1325)

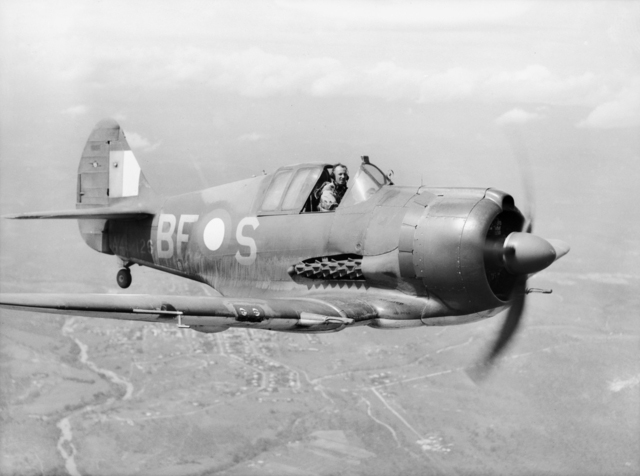
The CAC Boomerang

- CAC Boomerang (fighter)
  - CA-12: first production contract; 105 built (c/nos. 824–928)
  - CA-13: second production contract; 95 built (c/nos. 929–1023)
  - CA-14: experimental fitted with turbocharger; one built (c/no. 1074) (Note: One source (ADF Serials) lists both aircraft as having c/no. 1074.)
  - CA-19: third (and final) production contract; 49 built (c/nos. 1024–1072)
- CAC Mustang (fighter, North American P-51 Mustang)
  - CA-17: first production contract; 80 assembled from imported components (c/nos. 1326–1405, 1326–1345 also assigned North American c/nos. NA110-34366 to -34385) (Note: The series of books written by Stewart Wilson lists c/nos. for these aircraft as being different by 100, i.e first Mustang as c/no. 1226, Winjeel prototypes as c/nos. 1426 and 1427 etc. However, surviving civil-registered CAC Mustangs operated as warbirds have c/nos. in the 1326–1525 block.)
  - CA-18: second production contract; 120 built, production of a further 50 cancelled (c/nos. 1406–1525)
  - CA-21: third (and final) production contract for 100 aircraft; contract cancelled, none built

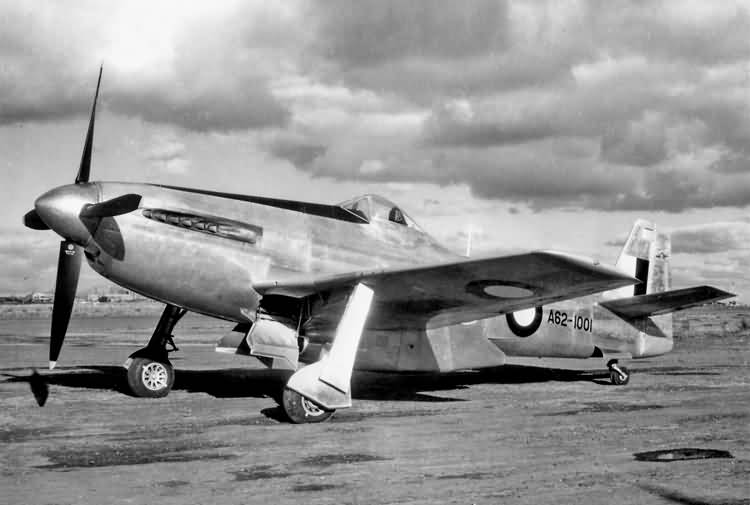
The prototype CAC CA-15 "Kangaroo"

- CAC CA-15 "Kangaroo" (fighter)
  - CA-15: prototype only
- CAC Winjeel (trainer)
  - CA-22: prototypes; two built (c/nos. 1526, 1527)
  - CA-25: production contract; 62 built (c/nos. CA25-1 to -62)
- CAC CA-26, CA-27 Avon-Sabre (fighter)
  - CA-26: prototype; one built (c/no. 1528) (Note: Sources list the c/no. as 1428, but this was assigned to a Mustang.)
  - CA-27: production contract; 111 built (c/nos. CA27-1 to -111)

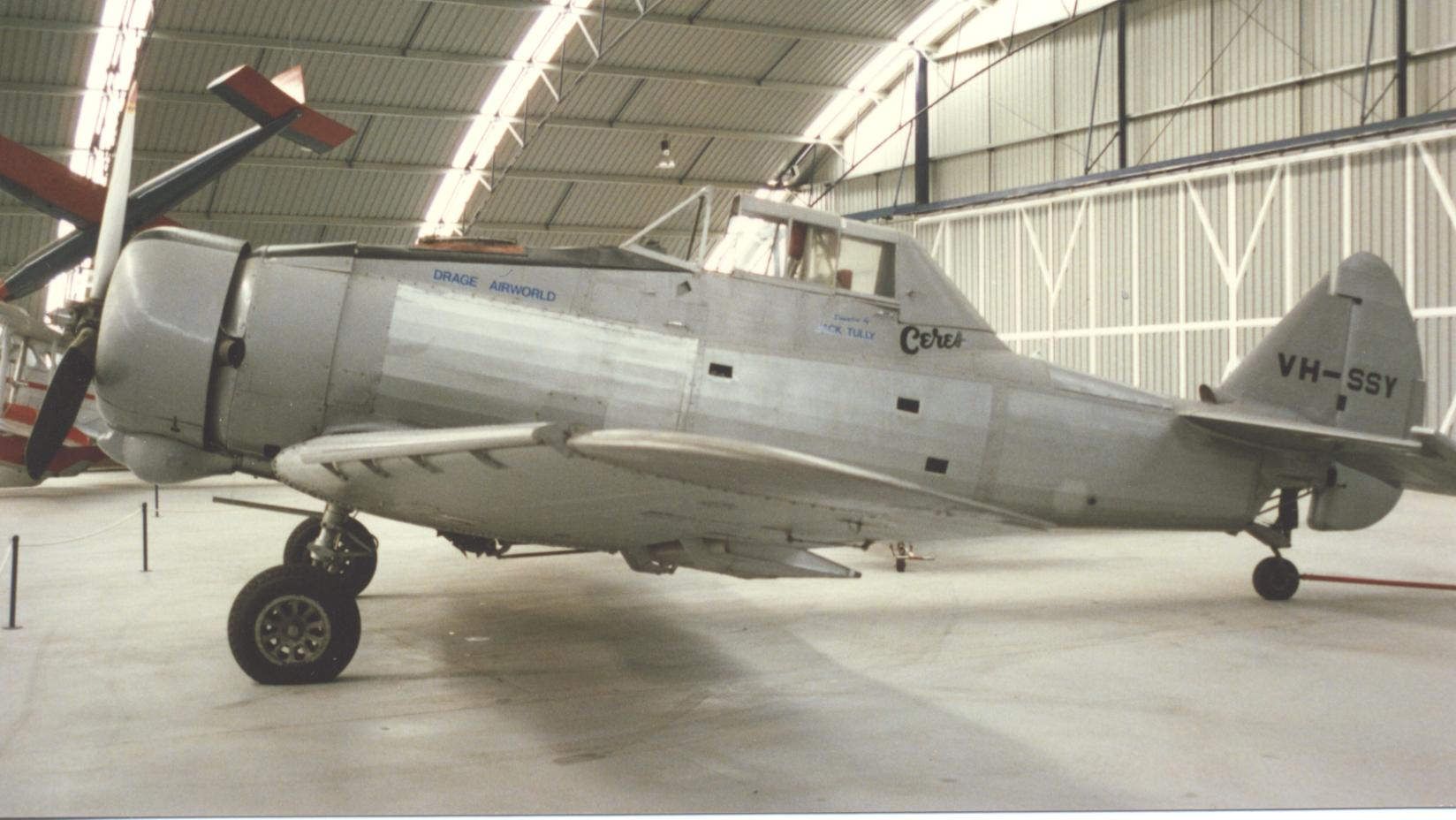
The CAC CA-28 Ceres crop duster

- CAC CA-28 Ceres (crop duster)
  - CA-28: production contract, built as private venture; 21 built (c/nos. CA28-1 to -21)
- Macchi MB-326H (trainer)
  - CA-30: production contract; 20 assembled from imported components plus 77 built (c/nos. CA30-1 to -97, CA30-1 to -13 and -15 to -21 also assigned non-consecutive Aermacchi c/nos. between 6351 and 6395)
- Bell Kiowa OH-58A (light observation helicopter)
  - CA-32: production contract; 12 assembled from imported components plus 44 built (c/nos. CA32-13 to -56, all 56 aircraft also assigned Bell c/nos. 44501-44556). The Kiowa was the last type built by CAC.

==== Other aircraft design and production ====
The company was part of the Australian Aircraft Consortium which designed the A10 Wamira, but this programme was cancelled in 1985 shortly after the prototype was completed. At the time of purchase by Hawker de Havilland, CAC had begun delivering components for the GAF-built version of the McDonnell Douglas F/A-18 Hornet.

- CA-15: single-seat fighter; one built (c/n 1073).
- CA-23: designation of a two-seat twin-engined supersonic jet fighter design. None built but extensive design work undertaken (see CAC CA-23)
- CA-24: contract for production of 72 of variant of the Hawker P.1081; none built
- CA-29: production sub-contract for wings, fins, rudders, tailcones and engines of GAF-built variant of Mirage IIIE; 101 airframe shipsets and 140 engines built
- CA-31: jet trainer design; none built (Macchi built instead).
- CA-33: contract for modifications to the RAAF fleet of Lockheed P-3C Orions; installing the Barra Sonobuoy system (developed for the RAAF and Royal Air Force by the Defence Science & Organisation (DSTO)) and associated systems after delivery of each aircraft from the USA; 20 aircraft modified (contract completed as HdHV)
- CA-34: designation used for CAC's participation in the A10 Wamira project
- CA-35: contract for modifications to a Fokker F27 Friendship (registration VH-EWP) to install the LADS system developed by the DSTO (contract completed as HdHV)
- CA-36: production sub-contract for the wing pylons, engine access panels, aft nozzle fairings, aircraft-mounted accessory drive gearboxes and engines for the GAF-built version of the F/A-18 Hornet; 73 airframe shipsets and 158 complete engines built, plus parts of another 17 engines (contract completed as HdHV)
- CA-??: Build & Test of Intermediate & Tailrotor Gearboxes for Sikorski UH-60 & SH-60 Helicopters.

=== Aero-engine production ===
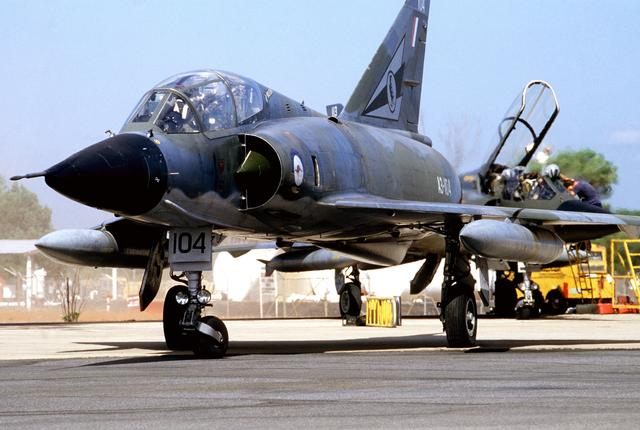
Mirage III, the engines for which were built by CAC

Engine types produced by CAC includes:

- Pratt & Whitney R-1340 Wasp built for the Wirraway
- Pratt & Whitney R-1830 Twin Wasp built for the Boomerang, Woomera and DAP Beaufort
- Rolls-Royce Merlin built for the GAF Lincoln
- Rolls-Royce Nene built for versions of the de Havilland Vampire manufactured by de Havilland Australia
- Rolls-Royce Avon built for the Sabre and GAF Canberra
- Snecma Atar built for the Dassault Mirage III
- Bristol Siddeley Viper built for the Macchi MB-326H
- General Electric F404 built for versions of the McDonnell Douglas F/A-18 Hornet manufactured by the Government Aircraft Factories/Aerospace Technologies of Australia
- General Electric T700 built for Sikorski UH-60 (-701A variant for Australian Army Blackhawk) and SH-60 (-401C variant for Australian Navy Seahawk) Helicopters.

== Locations ==
Butler Hangar
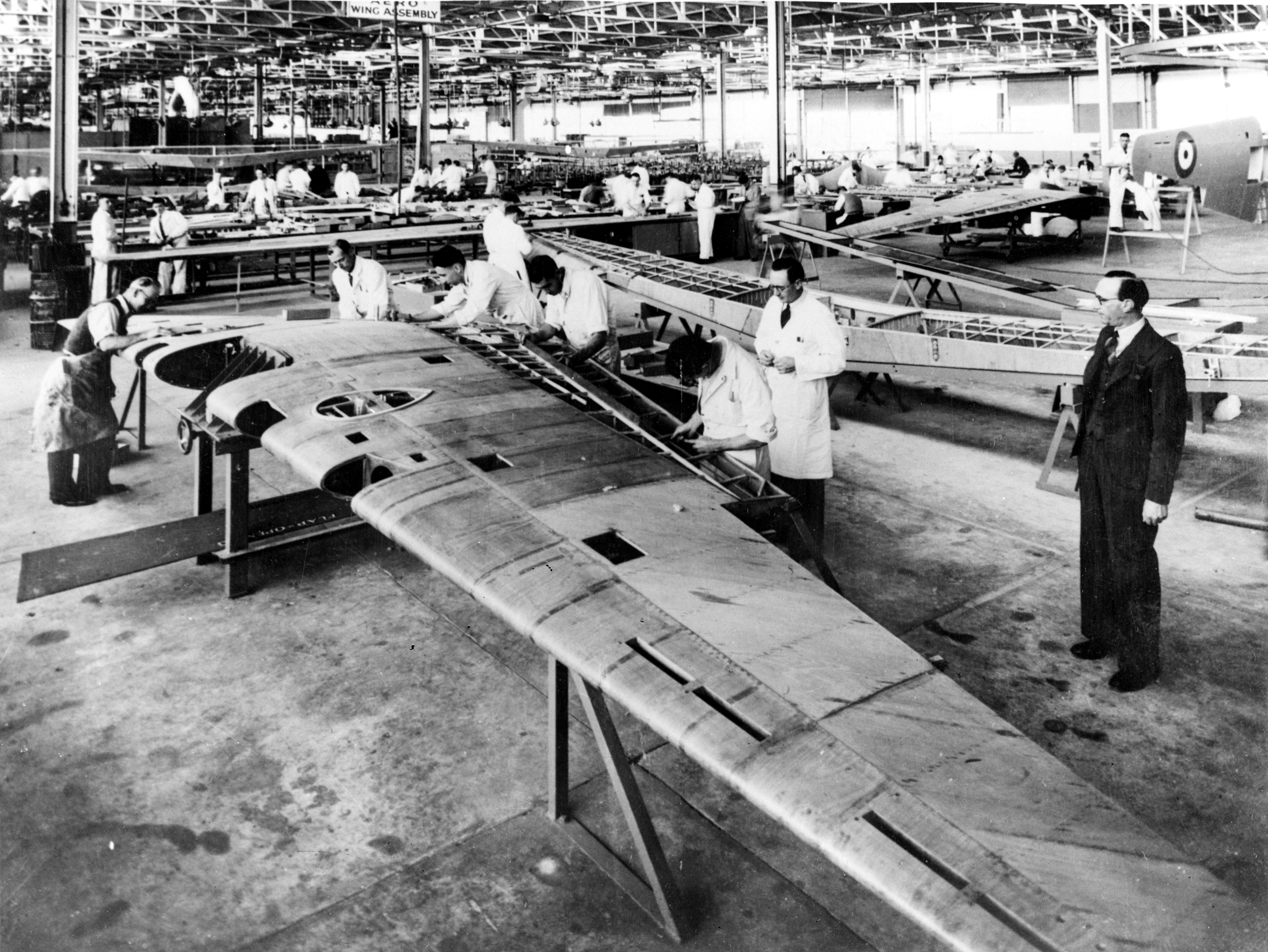
- Manufacture of a CAC Wackett in the Butler Hangar, 1943

- Location of the hangar in Greater Metropolitan Melbourne

General information
- Status: Relocated
- Type: Hangar
- Location: Tyabb Airport, Mornington Peninsula, Melbourne, Victoria, Australia
- Coordinates: 38°15′42″S 145°10′43″E
- Completed: 1937; 89 years ago (at Fishermans Bend)
- Relocated: c. 2003 – c. 2004 (in current location)
- Client: Commonwealth Airport Corporation

Technical details
- Structural system: Prefabricated
- Material: Steel; corrugated iron
- Size: 36 by 49 m (118 by 161 ft)
- Grounds: 59 ha (146 acres)

Victorian Heritage Register
- Official name: Former Commonwealth Aircraft Corporation Hangar (Dismantled and Re-erected)
- Type: Registered place
- Designated: 23 November 2006
- Reference no.: H0094
- Categories: Manufacturing and Processing; Transport - Air

In addition to its main site on Lorimer Street, Fishermans Bend, the CAC also had production facilities located in Lidcombe in Sydney, between 1941 and the late-1950s. Components for various projects were made elsewhere, including parts for the Bristol Beaufort bombers in South Australia.

=== Fishermans Bend site ===
Fishermans Bend became a centre of wartime aircraft industry with the adjacent Department of Aircraft Production (that became the Government Aircraft Factories) and the Aeronautical Research Laboratories. After World War II, these facilities continued manufacturing and assembling aircraft. The hangars, dating from World War II, comprise one US-made Butler Hangar and three British designed Bellman Hangars. The remaining Butler Hangar is one of two erected in 1942 for the assembly and flight testing of US aircraft. The other was relocated out of Victoria in 1943. After the departure of U.S. Army Air Forces in 1943, the single remaining Butler Hangar was used mainly as a shelter for factory aircraft undergoing flight testing. A portion of the hangar was walled off and used for the manufacture of a prototype of an advanced Australian designed fighter, the CA15, which only flew in 1946. After the CAC was purchased in 1986, the majority of its buildings were demolished in 2003-04.

==== The Butler Hangar ====
The fundamental purpose of hangars was to provide space where aircraft can be housed out of the weather and where they can be serviced and otherwise maintained under cover. Aeroplanes have large wingspans - the Wirraway had a span of 13.11 metres (43 ft) and the B-24 bomber a span of 33.53 metres (110 ft) - so the most important feature of a hangar is the provision of very large areas unobstructed by roof supports and large doors through which aeroplanes can pass.

The Butler Hangar is a steel-framed prefabricated building, 36 by 49 metres (118 by 161 ft), still clad in its original ribbed metal sheeting, an early use of this profile which has now replaced corrugated iron for large industrial structures. The US-based Butler Manufacturing Company, which produced many models of hangar during World War II, merged with BlueScope in 2004, and is the world's largest manufacturer of steel prefabricated buildings and a prolific supplier of hangars worldwide.

The hangar was designed in such a way as to permit dismantling and re-erection and for this reason, its removal to another aerodrome or site of aeronautical association, could be facilitated. The Butler Hangar was divided into two parts; the part nearest the apron was used to house aeroplanes including those delivered from the factory to be taken on charge by the RAAF, while the rear section was used by CAC for the development of new aeroplane types and for developing and testing components.

The Butler Hangar was also the wartime base of "Associated Airlines", the private corporate airline of BHP and the associated Collins House Group. Its aircraft were also used by Essington Lewis in his role as Director of Munitions and were also often used by Prime Minister John Curtin, in preference to airline services at Essendon Airport. The US Army and US Naval attaches also based their executive transport aircraft at the Butler Hangar during the war due to the high level of security there and easier access to Melbourne.

== See also ==
- List of places on the Victorian Heritage Register in the Shire of Mornington Peninsula
