= CAC Woomera =

1941 Australian bomber aircraft series

CA-4 Wackett Bomber/CA-11 Woomera
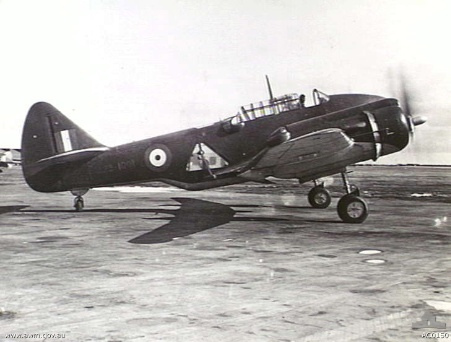
- CA-4 Wackett Bomber prototype A23-1001.

General information
- Type: light bomber reconnaissance dive bomber torpedo bomber
- Manufacturer: Commonwealth Aircraft Corporation
- Primary user: Royal Australian Air Force
- Number built: 2

History
- First flight: 19 September 1941

The CA-4 Wackett Bomber and CA-11 Woomera were prototype twin-engine light bombers, including torpedo and dive-bombing capabilities, developed by Commonwealth Aircraft Corporation (CAC) in Australia, during World War II. While two prototypes were completed and flight tested by the Royal Australian Air Force (RAAF), an order for the Woomera was cancelled before it went into production.

== Design and development ==
=== Background ===
In early 1939, the Australian Government ordered large numbers of Bristol Beaufort bombers, with major components to be built by its Department of Aircraft Production (DAP) in a variety of locations, including railway workshops, and in doing so it by-passed the local aircraft company, the Commonwealth Aircraft Corporation.

CAC, under Sir Lawrence Wackett, began work on its own design, hoping to out-perform the Beaufort by building a machine that could serve as both a torpedo-bomber and dive bomber. To keep down weight, Wackett dispensed with traditional self-sealing fuel tanks and opted to make the wing cavities liquid-tight, and thus serve as fuel storage. The Australian Government was initially uninterested in the CAC design. However, in mid-1940, cut off from the supply of British-made components for the Beaufort program (due to a British embargo on the export of aviation products, due to the need to maximise British production), the Australian Government ordered a prototype of the CAC design, even before the Royal Australian Air Force (RAAF) had expressed a view about the machine.

=== CA-4 ===
This prototype, known as the CA-4 Wackett Bomber, took to the air on 19 September 1941. The CA-4 was a low-wing, twin-engined, multi-role bomber with a crew of three. It was armed with four nose-mounted .303 calibre machine guns and two remote-controlled twin machine-guns barbette mounted at the rear of the engine nacelles. It could carry either 500 lb (230 kg) bombs, 250 lb (110 kg) bombs or two torpedoes. It was originally powered by two Pratt & Whitney Twin Wasp R-1830-S3C3-G radials.

Faced with the crisis caused by the Japanese entry into the war in December 1941, the RAAF accepted the design even before testing was complete, and ordered 105 examples of the CAC bomber on 8 March 1942. However, production was postponed until further testing was complete and also to allow CAC to focus on ramped-up production, for the Pacific War

On 15 January 1943, the prototype CA-4, A23-1001, crashed on a test flight to assess powerplant performance and evaluate aerodynamic effects of a new fixed leading edge slat. During the return to the CAC airfield at Fisherman's Bend, the pilot, Squadron Leader Jim Harper, had detected a fuel leak in the port Pratt & Whitney R-1830 engine. As the problem worsened he attempted to shut down the engine, feathering the propeller; however, the actuation of the feathering switch caused an explosion and uncontrollable fire. The three-man crew subsequently attempted evacuation at 1,000 feet (300 m), yet only Harper succeeded in parachuting free, while the CAC test pilot Jim Carter and power plant group engineer Lionel Dudgeon were both killed. The airframe subsequently impacted 3 miles (4.8 km) south-west of Kilmore, Victoria. The wreckage was recovered and used for components. In part, the incident was attributed to the novel fuel tank design.

=== CA-11 ===
After various aspects were re-designed, including the tail and rudder, and an improved nose armament of two 20 mm cannon and two .303 (7.7 mm) calibre machine guns, the project was officially redesignated the CA-11 Woomera.

The CA-11 did not fly until June 1944. By the time production was due to commence, the dive-bombing concept had fallen into disfavour and the RAAF was filling the light bomber/reconnaissance/strike role with the US-built Douglas Boston and the Beaufighter – a derivative of the Beaufort – was being built in Australia by DAP. Consequently, the original Woomera order was reduced from 105 to 20. After the first CA-11 flew, the whole program was cancelled and the production capacity set aside for Woomeras at CAC was switched to P-51 Mustang fighters. The only completed CA-11 Woomera, A23-1, was stripped for parts and scrapped in 1946.

== Operators ==
Australia

- Royal Australian Air Force

== Specifications ==
Orthographic projection of the first prototype CA-4 Wackett Bomber

Data from War Planes of the Second World War: Bombers and Reconnaissance Aircraft, Volume Seven

General characteristics

- Crew: 3
- Length: 39 ft 7 in (12.07 m)
- Wingspan: 59 ft 2.5 in (18.047 m)
- Height: 18 ft 2 in (5.54 m)
- Wing area: 440 sq ft (41 m^{2})
- Airfoil: root: NACA 2218.5; tip: NACA 2209
- Empty weight: 12,765 lb (5,790 kg)
- Max takeoff weight: 22,885 lb (10,380 kg)
- Powerplant: 2 × Pratt & Whitney R-1830-S3C3-G Twin Wasp 14 cylinder air-cooled radial piston engines, 1,200 hp (890 kW) each
- Propellers: 3-bladed constant-speed propellers

Performance

- Maximum speed: 282 mph (454 km/h, 245 kn)
- Cruise speed: 184 mph (296 km/h, 160 kn)
- Range: 2,225 mi (3,581 km, 1,933 nmi) (with external tank and one torpedo)
- Service ceiling: 23,500 ft (7,200 m)
- Rate of climb: 2,090 ft/min (10.6 m/s)

Armament

- Guns:
  - 2 × .303in (7.7 mm) Browning machine guns in the nose
  - 2 × 20 mm Hispano Mk II cannon in the nose
  - 4 × .303 Browning machine guns in two rear-firing remotely controlled barbettes
  - 1 x .303 Vickers K machine gun in a ventral position
- Bombs:
  - 4× 250 lb (113 kg) bombs internally in engine nacelle bays
  - and 4× 500 lb (224 kg) bombs
  - or 2× 45 cm Mk XII, Mk XV or 57 cm Mk 13 aerial torpedoes mounted under the fuselage
  - or 1× torpedo and 1× 293 imp gal (1,330 L; 352 US gal) external fuel tank mounted under the fuselage

== See also ==
Aircraft of comparable role, configuration, and era

- Arkhangelsky Ar-2
- Junkers Ju 88
- Kawasaki Ki-48
- Martin Baltimore
- Petlyakov Pe-2
- Savoia-Marchetti SM.85
- Tupolev Tu-2
- Yokosuka P1Y

Related lists

- List of aircraft of World War II

== Bibliography ==
- Ewer, Peter. Wounded Eagle: The Bombing of Darwin and Australia's Air Defence Scandal. Sydney: New Holland, 2009. ISBN 978-1-74110-825-5
- Green, William. War Planes of the Second World War: Bombers and Reconnaissance Aircraft, Volume Seven. London: Macdonald, 1967. ISBN 0-356-01477-0.
- Isaacs, Keith. "Wackett's Wonder". Air Enthusiast Quarterly, No. 1, n.d., pp. 52–65. ISSN 0143-5450
