= James Sanders (RAF officer) =

British WWII flying ace (1914–2002)

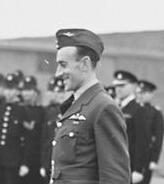
- Born: 19 June 1914; Richmond, London, England
- Died: 12 August 2002 (aged 88); London, England
- Military career
- Allegiance: United Kingdom
- Branch: Royal Air Force
- Service years: 1935–1947
- Rank: Wing Commander
- Nickname: 'Sandy'
- Commands: No. 422 Flight; RAF Hunsdon; RAF Zeals; RAF Hutton Cranswick
- Conflicts: Second World War: Phoney War; Battle of France; Battle of Britain; The Blitz
- Awards: Distinguished Flying Cross

James Sanders, DFC (19 June 1914 – 12 August 2002) was a British flying ace who served in the Royal Air Force (RAF) during the Second World War. Poor record keeping means there is some uncertainty regarding his tally of aerial victories but he is believed to have destroyed around sixteen aircraft.

Born in Richmond, London, Sanders joined the RAF in 1935 and following completion of his flying training, was posted to No. 111 Squadron where he was involved in the introduction into service of the Hawker Hurricane fighter. Soon after the outbreak of the Second World War he was transferred to No. 615 Squadron after performing unauthorised aerial acrobatics. The squadron was sent to France during the Phoney War and during this time he claimed his first aerial victory with further claims made during the Battle of France. Awarded the Distinguished Flying Cross, he also flew in the subsequent aerial campaigns over the southeast of England from August 1940 to May 1941, and among his claims for aircraft shot down were some made as a night fighter pilot with No. 255 Squadron. For much of the remainder of the war, he performed instructing duties and commanded RAF stations. He ended his military service in 1947, and then worked for an insurance company in London. He died in 2002 at the age of 88.

== Early life ==
James Gilbert Sanders was born on 19 June 1914 at Richmond, London, in England. His father, an archeologist, lived in Genoa in Italy where Sanders was educated. He also attended university in Italy, studying marine archeology. Despising fascism and believing in the likelihood of war, Sanders joined the Royal Air Force (RAF) on a short service commission in 1935. Nicknamed 'Sandy', he commenced his initial training in November of that year.

Commissioned as an acting pilot officer in January 1936, Sanders commenced flight training at No. 10 Flying Training School at Ternhill the following month. In August 1936, having completed his pilot training, Sanders was posted to No. 111 Squadron. His new unit was stationed at Northolt and equipped with the Gloster Gauntlet biplane fighter.

In November 1937, No. 111 Squadron was the first unit in the RAF to receive the Hawker Hurricane fighter, working to prepare the aircraft for operational service. In February 1938 Sanders was landing his Hurricane at Tangmere to demonstrate the fighter to the pilots based there and its undercarriage collapsed. With the assistance of ground crew, he was quickly able to restore the undercarriage to its wheels-down position and return to Northolt. The issue was an airlock in the hydraulic system and warning signage was added to the cockpit to act as reminder to pilots to ensure the undercarriage was locked in place before landing. Sanders subsequently worked on fighter tactics, being attached to the Air Fighting Development Establishment during his time with the squadron.

== Second World War ==
Shortly after the outbreak of the Second World War in September 1939, Sanders was disciplined by Squadron Leader Harry Broadhurst, the commander of No. 111 Squadron, for performing unauthorised aerial acrobatics and placed under arrest. Thanks to the influence of Air Vice Marshal Leslie Gossage, who was a friend of the Sanders family, his punishment was a posting away to No. 615 Squadron, of the Auxiliary Air Force, as one of its flight leaders. The squadron was stationed at Croydon and flew Gloster Gladiator biplane fighters. In November it was sent to France with the RAF component of the British Expeditionary Force (BEF). It served, firstly at Merville and then Vitry, alongside No. 607 Squadron as part of No. 60 Wing.

=== Battle of France ===
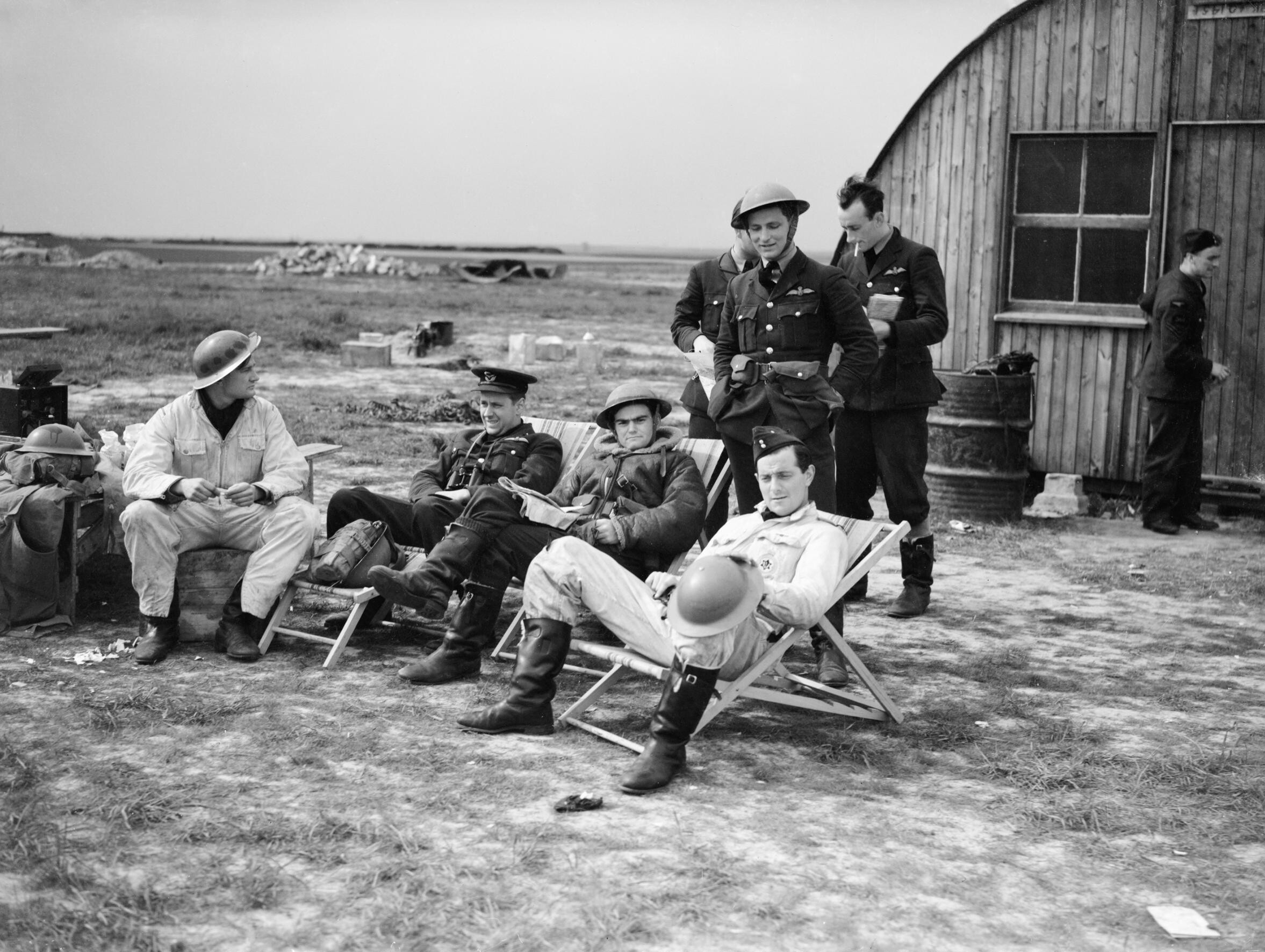
Pilots of No. 615 Squadron at Abbeville in France; Sanders stands on the centre right, smoking a cigarette

No. 615 Squadron saw little activity for the next few months although on 29 December, Sanders was taking his Gladiator on a weather check when he engaged and damaged a Heinkel He 111 medium bomber. His own aircraft received return fire from the He 111 and was damaged, necessitating a crash landing at Valenciennes. In April 1940, the squadron began reequipping with Hurricanes.

From 10 May, when the Germans invaded France and the Low Countries, No. 615 Squadron was extensively engaged in patrols and bomber escort missions for several days. During this time Sanders shot down two German aircraft although details are lacking. On 17 May, he destroyed a Junkers Ju 88 medium bomber but his Hurricane was damaged in the engagement and he force-landed at Béthune. He was able to board a train ahead of the advancing German army but partway through the journey it was fired upon. Abandoning the train, he was picked up by a passing RAF truck making for Abbeville. There he found a Bristol Blenheim light bomber with RAF ground crew but no pilot. Despite his lack of experience in flying multi-engined aircraft, under the cover of night he flew the Blenheim, carrying several ground crew as passengers, to England. He landed at Northolt in the early hours of 18 May. In the meantime the squadron was ordered to evacuate France and returned to England on 20 May.

While No. 615 Squadron went to Kenley, on 23 May Sanders was appointed a flight commander and given charge of six Gladiators which were attached to No. 604 Squadron at Manston. For the next week, he flew operations to Dunkirk, providing coverage for Operation Dynamo, the evacuation of the BEF from the beaches there. He returned to No. 615 Squadron at the end of the month. His services during the previous few weeks saw him awarded the Distinguished Flying Cross. Gazetted on 4 June, the published citation read:

This officer has led his flight well and has personally shot down three enemy aircraft.

— London Gazette, No. 34864, 4 June 1940

After a period of recovery, No. 615 Squadron returned to offensive operations in mid-June, flying to France on bomber escort missions in aid of the elements of the BEF still remaining in France after Operation Dynamo. Sanders shot down one Messerschmitt Bf 110 heavy fighter and damaged a second, both near Rouen, on 22 June. He ran low on fuel as a result of the engagement and, unable to return to Kenley, had to land on the Isle of Wight. He destroyed a Messerschmitt Bf 109 fighter on 30 June but this was unable to be confirmed.

=== Battle of Britain ===
From July onward, No. 615 Squadron became increasingly engaged in the Battle of Britain. On 16 August, Sanders damaged a pair of He 111s near Brighton and two days later, on what is now known as The Hardest Day, he destroyed a He 111 to the south of Kenley, and then a Ju 88 near Westerham. The latter aircraft crashed near Winston Churchill's house at Chartwell. He also damaged a Ju 88 near Sevenoaks. Sanders also flew occasional sorties at night; on the night of 24 August, he caught and destroyed a Ju 88 near Hastings. He also damaged a He 111 in the same vicinity. A rare nighttime aerial victory for the RAF at the time, Air Vice Marshal Keith Park, commander of No. 11 Group, sent congratulations to Sander by telegram.

Sanders was promoted to flight lieutenant in late August. No. 615 Squadron was rested at the end of the month and went north to Prestwick in Scotland. It was replaced at Kenley by No. 253 Squadron, with Sanders volunteering to be attached to the unit. A factor in his decision was his girlfriend, Joan Barley; the couple married later in the year. Like its predecessor, No. 253 Squadron flew Hurricanes and was heavily engaged throughout September, being regularly scrambled two or three times a day before the Luftwaffe reduced the intensity of its operations. Sanders still flew on night fighter duties, and on the night of 23 September, shot down a He 111 near Chobham.

A few days later Sanders was attached to No. 66 Squadron, at Gravesend, where he was a foundation member of No. 421 Flight. His experiences operating at night subsequently saw Sanders being called upon to work at the Fighter Interception Unit (FIU) at Shoreham on fighter techniques using radar. In October, he was given command of No. 422 Flight. Operating Hurricanes, this carried out night time patrols to intercept German bombers and two months later, this became No. 96 Squadron with Sanders one of the flight commanders. The squadron moved to Cranage with responsibility for the defence of Liverpool.

=== Later war service ===
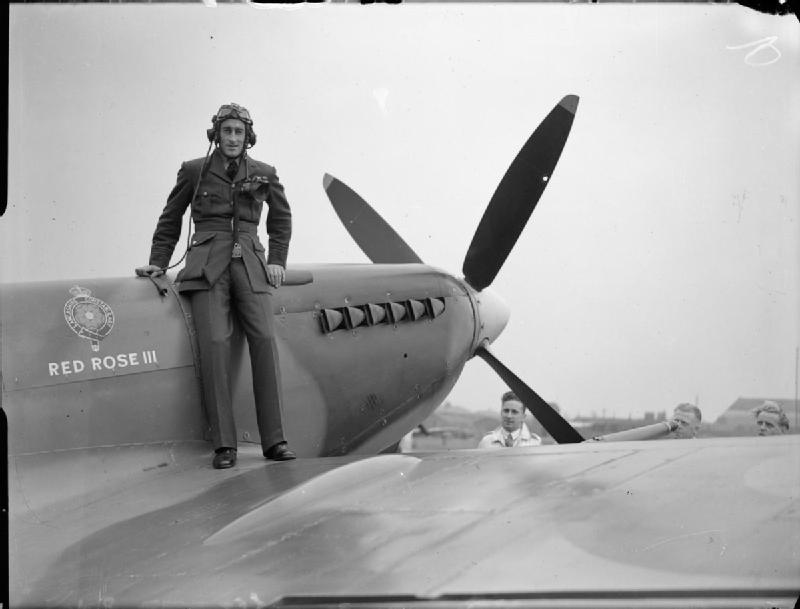
Sanders with a presentation Supermarine Spitfire fighter prior to its delivery flight to Biggin Hill in the later stages of the war

In January 1941, Sanders was posted to No. 257 Squadron but he was only there for a month before moving onto No. 255 Squadron. This was based at Kirton-in-Lindsey and operated the Boulton Paul Defiant night fighter. He claimed a He 111 as probably destroyed near the squadron's base on the night of 12 March; this was only the third claim made by a pilot of the squadron. Flying over Brigg on the night of 7 April, Sanders damaged a Ju 88. Although there are no details due to poor record keeping, both on his part and on that of the squadron, he is credited with at least three additional nighttime aerial victories.

In June, Sanders was assigned to instructing duties at the Operational Training Unit (OTU) at East Fortune. Promoted to temporary squadron leader in September 1941, he was then appointed 'officer commanding, flying' at the OTU. In May the following year, he was made 'wing commander, flying' at the OTUs at Llandow and then Rednal, piloting the Mustang IV fighter. He later commanded three RAF stations in succession, Hunsdon, Zeals and Hutton Cranswick, before attending a course for senior commanders at the RAF college at Cranwell. He was promoted to temporary wing commander in July 1944, with his substantive rank being made up to squadron leader later in the year. Sanders finished his war service in Europe with a posting to Supreme Headquarters Allied Powers Europe, serving on its mission to the Netherlands.

== Later life ==
In the immediate postwar period Sanders was sent to Java, before going onto British India where he served as 'officer commanding, flying' at the Mingaladon airfield in Rangoon. He returned to England in 1947. By this time his marriage to Joan Barley had foundered and wanting to please his new partner, Josephine King-Farlow, he left the RAF, holding the rank of wing commander. He commenced work for an insurance company, Crown Life of Canada, being based in its Mayfair office. He had three children; two sons with Joan Barley, and a third, a daughter, with Josephine King-Farlow who he married in 1949 after the dissolution of his first marriage. One of his sons also served with the RAF. His wife having predeceased him some years previously, he died at his home in London on 12 August 2002.

There is some uncertainty regarding the number of aerial victories claimed by Sanders. The records of No. 615 Squadron for its operations during the Battle of France are incomplete and Sanders also lost his logbook in the campaign. Military aviation historians Christopher Shores and Clive Williams credit him with having destroyed 16 German aircraft, although there are no details for eight of these, with one more aerial victory shared with another pilot. In addition he is credited with one aircraft probably destroyed and six damaged.
