= Aircraft Systems Engineering Squadron =

Aerospace Systems Engineering Squadron
- Active: 2003 - 2016
- Country: Australia
- Branch: Royal Australian Air Force
- Role: Non-Standard Modification Design
- Part of: Air Warfare Centre Development and Test Wing
- Garrison/HQ: RAAF Base Edinburgh
- Motto(s): Design Innovate Enable

Commanders
- Current commander: Wing Commander J. Blagg

The Aerospace Systems Engineering Squadron (ASE SQN) was a squadron of the Royal Australian Air Force, that designed and developed non-standard modifications, special test equipment and facilities, and telemetry functions to support flight tests.

ASE SQN was located at RAAF Base Edinburgh in Adelaide, South Australia.

In 2016, the squadron was amalgamated with the Aircraft Stores Compatibility Engineering Squadron, to form the Air Warfare Engineering Squadron.
