= Paul Rabone =

New Zealand fighter pilot and flying ace

Paul Wattling Rabone
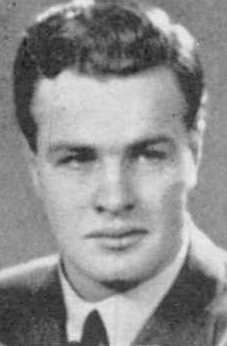
- Born: 2 March 1918; Salisbury, England
- Died: 24 July 1944 (aged 26); North Sea
- Burial place: Hotton War Cemetery, Belgium
- Military career
- Allegiance: United Kingdom
- Branch: Royal Air Force
- Service years: 1938–1944
- Rank: Squadron Leader
- Units: No. 515 Squadron; No. 23 Squadron; No. 488 Squadron; No. 422 Flight; No. 145 Squadron; No. 88 Squadron
- Commands: No. 1528 Beam Approach Training Flight; No. 1451 Flight
- Conflicts: Second World War; Battle of France; Battle of Britain; The Blitz; Channel Front
- Awards: Distinguished Flying Cross

Paul Wattling Rabone DFC (2 March 1918 – 24 July 1944) was a New Zealand fighter pilot and flying ace who flew in the Royal Air Force (RAF) during the Second World War. Born in Salisbury, England, he was educated in New Zealand. He joined the RAF in 1938 and was posted to No. 88 Squadron, which was sent to France in September 1939 after the outbreak of the Second World War. He flew a Fairey Battle during the Battle of France, and was twice shot down.

Returning to England at the end of the fighting in France, he transferred to Fighter Command and flew in the Battle of Britain. He later switched to nighttime operations, flying interception missions during the Blitz and intruder flights to France, interspersed with periods of instructing duties. He was a flight commander when No. 488 (NZ) Squadron was formed in 1942, and much of the year was spent in training before commencing offensive night operations to France. From June 1943 to the end of that year, he flew with No. 23 Squadron in support of operations in Italy. Killed while flying an operation to Germany, he was credited with the destruction of nine enemy aircraft at the time of his death.

== Early life ==
Born in Salisbury, in England on 2 March 1918, Paul Wattling Rabone was the eldest son of Clarence Rabone and his wife Frances May. His father was from Christchurch in New Zealand. He was educated at schools in Palmerston North and New Plymouth. On completing his education he took up farming and also joined the Territorial Force, serving in an artillery unit.

In early 1938, Rabone made an application for a short service commission in the Royal New Zealand Air Force (RNZAF). He received flight training at civilian facilities, including the Auckland Aero Club and, after gaining his pilot's licence in April, was accepted for the RNZAF. Two months later he went to the RNZAF's No. 1 Flight Training School at Wigram and was awarded his wings in October. He was sent to England to serve with the Royal Air Force (RAF), departing in February 1939. On arrival he proceeded to RAF Uxbridge where he formally transferred to the RAF, conceding his commission in the RNZAF and commencing a five year short service commission as a pilot officer, with effect from 15 March 1939. He was posted to No. 88 Squadron, which operated Fairey Battles, a monoplane light bomber, from Boscombe Down.

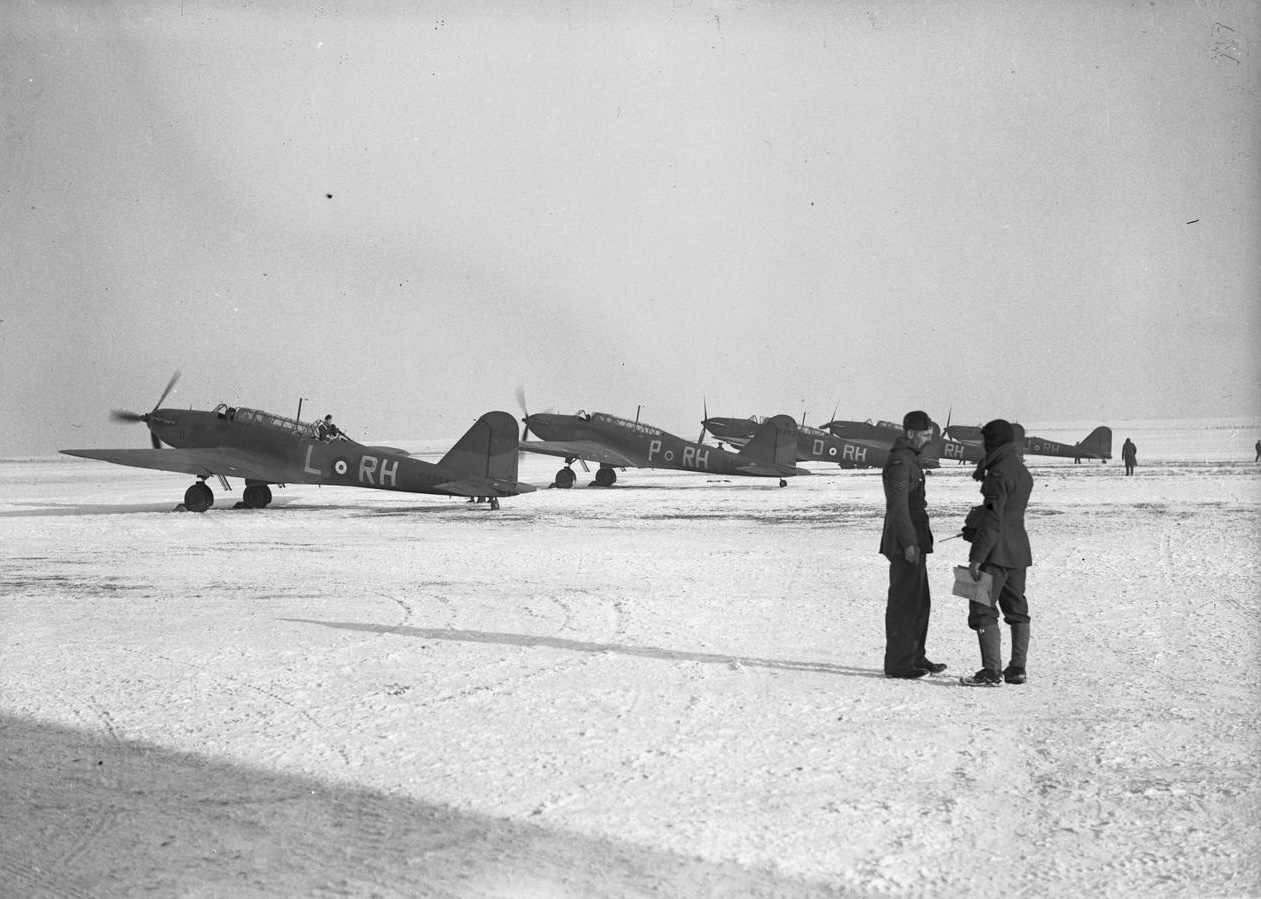
Fairey Battles of No. 88 Squadron at the airfield at Mourmelon-le-Grand

== Second World War ==
Just before the outbreak of the Second World War, No. 88 Squadron was sent to France as part of the Advanced Air Striking Force. During the Phoney War, it flew reconnaissance missions. Once the Battle of France commenced in May 1940, the squadron began offensive operations. On 10 May, it mounted an attack on a bridge at Maastricht. During this mission, his Battle was damaged by flak and he and his crew had to bail out. They landed behind enemy lines but after gaining civilian clothes were able to it make back to Dieppe after five days of walking. There they found three Hawker Hurricane fighters in various states of disrepair; cannibalising parts from the other two aircraft he was able to make one servicable and flew it to England.

Rejoining his squadron, which was still in France, Rabone was shot down by a Messerschmitt Bf 109 fighter on 12 June while on another bombing mission, this time targeting a bridge over the Seine. Along with his crew, he bailed out and landed behind the British lines. A few days after they made their way back to No. 88 Squadron, it was withdrawn to England. While in France, he had flown in a total of 16 missions.

Responding to a call for volunteers, Rabone joined Fighter Command and in August was posted to No. 145 Squadron, which operated the Hurricane. It was based at Drem at the time, resting from a period of service with No. 11 Group. Two months later it reentered the Battle of Britain with a shift to Tangmere. By this time he was a flying officer, having been promoted in September. On 12 October, he encountered two Bf 109 fighters near Dungeness, when they came at him out of the sun. All three aircraft flew in a tight circle and when one of the Bf 109s broke out of the flight pattern, Rabone shot it down. He managed to evade the other Bf 109, landing back at Tangmere with over 30 bullet holes in his aircraft.

=== Night operations ===
Later in October, Rabone was transferred to No. 422 Flight, operating Hurricanes from Shoreham and flying patrols during the day while also attempting interceptions at night. He shot down a Bf 109 on 6 November and later that month had to twice make emergency landings. His unit switched to night fighting duties in December and was re-designated No. 96 Squadron, which was tasked with the defence of the Midlands. When Manchester and the Midlands was raided on the night of 22 December by a large force of around 300 bombers, he shot down one, having noticed the glare of its exhausts. The aircraft he shot down was one of only three destroyed that night. On a subsequent patrol, he suffered an engine failure and had to bail out. He landed in one of London's parks.

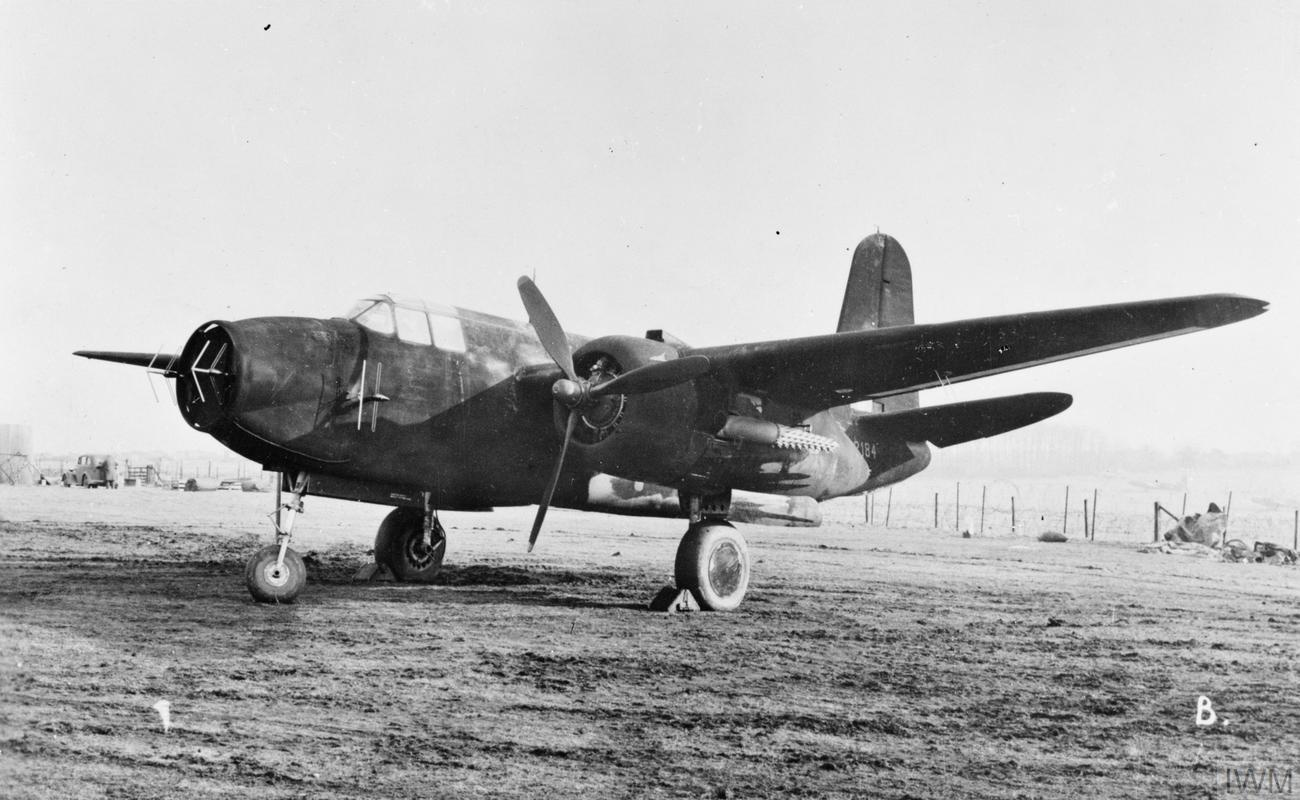
A Turbinlite Havoc, which was equipped with a searchlight in its nose

Shortly afterwards he was promoted to flight lieutenant and was appointed commander of a flight. By April 1941, the squadron had converted to the Boulton Paul Defiant night fighter. Rabone was flying a Defiant on a night patrol on 5 April, when he and his gunner bailed out over Derbyshire after his aircraft's engine failed. The next month he was transferred to No. 85 Squadron, which operated the Douglas A-20 Havoc night fighter. After two months of night operations, he was appointed commander of No. 1451 Flight, with the rank of acting squadron leader. His command flew the Turbinlite, which was a Havoc aircraft equipped with a searchlight in its nose. When operating interception missions at night, it used its radar equipment to locate enemy aircraft, then illuminate them with the searchlight once spotted so that an accompanying Hurricane of No. 3 Squadron could endeavour to shoot it down. Rabone led the flight until October, at which time he was stood down.

Rabone went to Kenley, where he received training in fighter controlling while attached to No. 485 (NZ) Squadron and from there was posted to the headquarters of No. 11 Group. He was then appointed commander of No. 1528 Beam Approach Training Flight; this was a new unit with Rabone tasked with raising it. Originally based at Drem, in April 1942 the flight was moved to West Malling, operating in the early hours of the morning and in the evenings. The following month, he was posted to No. 256 Squadron, at the time undergoing conversion to the Bristol Beaufighter heavy fighter.

In June 1942, No. 488 (NZ) Squadron, a New Zealand unit, was raised at Church Fenton. Under the command of Wing Commander Richard Trousdale, it was to be a night fighter unit operating Beaufighters with Rabone one of its flight commanders. After an initial period of training, the pilots learning to use their onboard interception equipment and techniques for co-operating with searchlight and anti-aircraft units, it moved to Ayr in Scotland. Rabone's flight was sent to Drem, where it was to target German reconnaissance aircraft making flights over the North Sea. From early 1943, the squadron began to undertake offensive operations, termed 'Ranger' patrols, during the periods of moonlight. The first of these involved three aircraft and took place on 16 February, with Rabone accompanying Trousdale and another New Zealand pilot, in flying to attack targets in France. Rabone turned back after encountering bad weather after crossing the English Channel. These activities continued for the next few months, typically targeting trains and railway infrastructure.

=== Operations in Italy ===
At the end of April, Rabone was stood down from active flight duties and returned to his substantive rank of flight lieutenant while based at various Operational Training Units (OTU) on instructing duties. Then in mid-June he was posted to No. 23 Squadron, at the time based in Malta and operating the de Havilland Mosquito on intruder missions to Italy. Shortly after his arrival, he was appointed a flight commander and resumed his acting rank of squadron leader. He regularly flew missions targeting transports and airfields, on one occasion strafing three CANT Z.506 Airone floatplanes that were moored at Lake Bracciano. He also shot down a Junkers Ju 88 medium bomber into the sea. At the time, he was flying a Supermarine Spitfire fighter and was delivering spare parts to a detachment of his squadron that was based at Palermo. On 8 September, with the squadron now operating from Sicily, Rabone shot down another Ju 88 and a Heinkel He 111 medium bomber in an attack on an airfield at Grosseto. A second He 111 was damaged during the raid.

Returning to the United Kingdom in November Rabone took up instructing duties at No. 60 OTU. In early 1944, he was awarded the Distinguished Flying Cross, the honour being gazetted on 25 January. He returned to operations in March 1944, flying with No. 515 Squadron. By this time his short service commission with the RAF had ended, and he transferred back to the RNZAF. With No. 515 Squadron, he flew the Mosquito on intruder missions from Little Snoring to enemy airfields in France and also escorted aircraft carrying out mine-laying operations. In June the squadron also commenced daytime operations, known as 'Rangers' in support of the Allied invasion of France. The intention was to draw out and wear down the enemy fighter opposition. He shot down a Messerschmitt Bf 110 heavy fighter on 21 June, the squadron's first victory in the daylight. At the end of the month, he destroyed a He 111 as it landed at Jagel-Schleswig and shortly afterwards shot down a Junkers W 34.

=== Final flight ===
In July Rabone was sent back to No. 23 Squadron which had returned to England and was based at Little Snoring. His last mission was on 24 July, when he flew to Germany to attack a target there but failed to return. His body washed ashore a few months later at Heligoland, where it was buried. His remains were recovered after the war and re-interred in Belgium, at Hotton War Cemetery. He was survived by his wife, Pamela née Buchanan who he had married on 12 September 1941.

Rabone was a flying ace, credited with the destruction of nine enemy aircraft, one damaged, and three more damaged while on the water.
