= Aircraft Stores Compatibility Engineering Squadron =

- Active: ?–2016
- Country: Australia
- Branch: Royal Australian Air Force
- Role: ADF Weapons Clearance Authority
- Part of: Air Warfare Centre Development and Test Wing
- Garrison/HQ: RAAF Base Edinburgh

Commanders
- Current commander: Wing Commander A. Leahy

The Aircraft Stores Compatibility Engineering Squadron (ASCENG SQN) was the Australian Defence Force design authority for aircraft/stores compatibility and air weapons engineering.

It was located at RAAF Base Edinburgh in Adelaide, South Australia.

In 2016, the squadron was amalgamated with the Aircraft Systems Engineering Squadron, to form the Air Warfare Engineering Squadron.
