= No. 1451 Flight RAF =

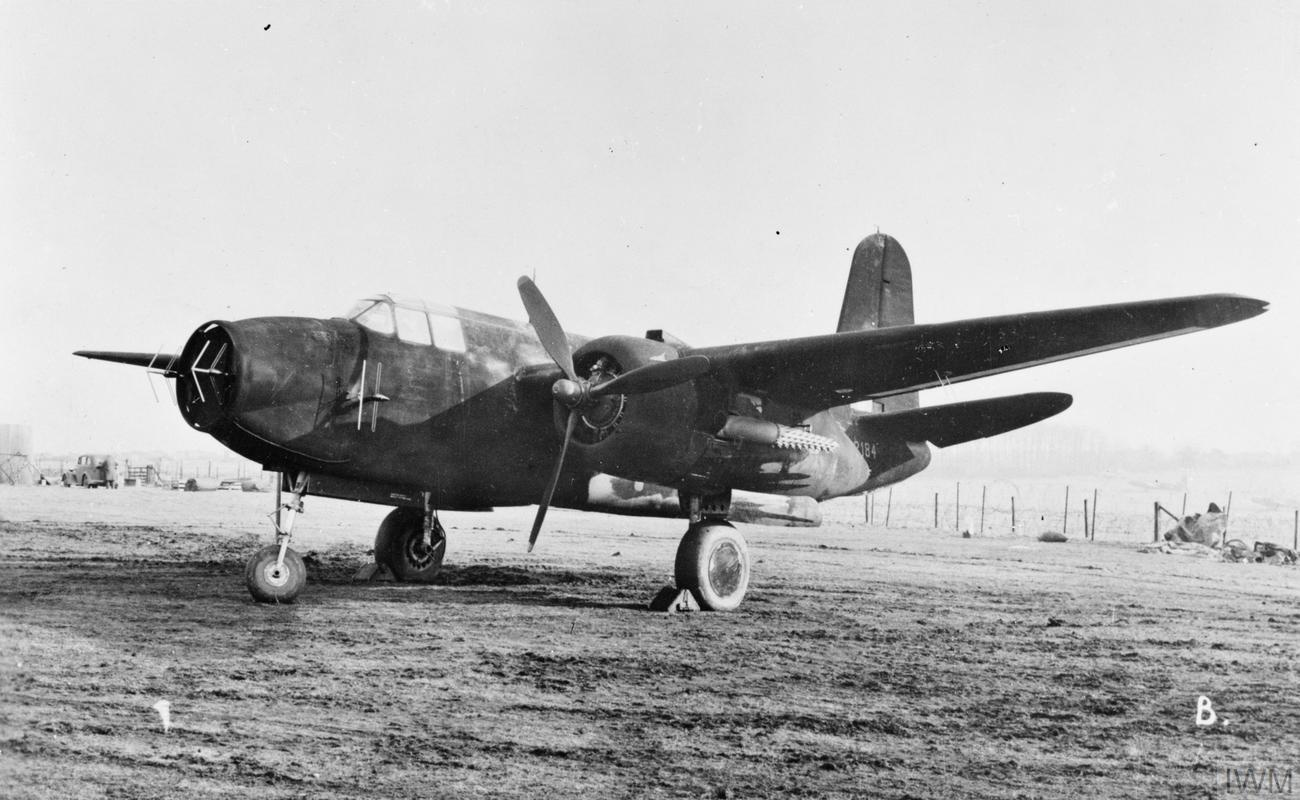
- Turbinlite equipped Douglas Havoc, like the ones used by the flight
- Active: 22 May 1941 – 8 Sep 1942
- Country: United Kingdom
- Branch: Royal Air Force
- Role: Night fighter (Turbinlite)
- Part of: No. 11 Group RAF, Fighter Command

Insignia
- Badge: No badge authorised
- Squadron Codes: No known identification code for the flight is known to have been carried

No. 1451 (Fighter) Flight was formed at RAF Hunsdon, Hertfordshire on 22 May 1941, equipped with Turbinlite Douglas Boston and Douglas Havoc aircraft. On operations they co-operated at first with Hawker Hurricanes of No. 1422 Flight RAF and later with Hurricanes of 3 Squadron. The flight was replaced with 530 Squadron on 8 September 1942 (not on 2 September due to administrative reasons) but officially disbanded as late as 25 January 1943.

530 Sqn, which had taken over men and machines, carried on flying the Turbinlite Bostons and Havocs till the system was abandoned on 25 January 1943, when Turbinlite squadrons were, due to lack of success on their part and the rapid development of AI radar, thought to be superfluous.

== Aircraft operated ==
Aircraft operated by no. 1451 Flight RAF, data from
From	To	Aircraft	Version
22 May 1941	8 September 1942	Douglas Havoc	Mk.I (Turbinlite)
22 May 1941	8 September 1942	Douglas Havoc	Mk.I
22 May 1941	8 September 1942	Douglas Havoc	Mk.II (Turbinlite)
22 May 1941	8 September 1942	Douglas Havoc	Mk.II
22 May 1941	8 September 1942	Douglas Boston	Mk.II (Turbinlite)
22 May 1941	8 September 1942	Douglas Boston	Mk.III (Turbinlite)

== Flight bases ==
Bases and airfields used by no. 1451 Flight RAF, data from
From	To	Base
22 May 1941	8 September 1942	RAF Hunsdon, Hertfordshire

== Commanding officers ==
Officers commanding no. 1451 Flight RAF
From	To	Name
22 May 1941	July 1941	S/Ldr. D.C. Hobbis, DFC
July 1941	November 1941	S/Ldr. Paul Rabone
