= Aircraft Research and Development Unit RAAF =

Aircraft Research and Development Unit
- Active: 1943 – present
- Country: Australia
- Branch: Royal Australian Air Force
- Role: Test and evaluation
- Part of: Air Warfare Centre Test and Evaluation Directorate
- Garrison/HQ: RAAF Base Edinburgh with flights at RAAF Base Amberley and RAAF Base Williamtown
- Motto: Prove to Accomplish
- Aircraft: Pilatus PC-21

Commanders
- Current commander: Wing Commander L. McDowall
- Notable commanders: J.A. Rowland (1959); M.A. Skidmore (2000–02); D.J. Fawcett (2003–04)

Insignia
- Callsigns: TESTER and DELTA (for formations)

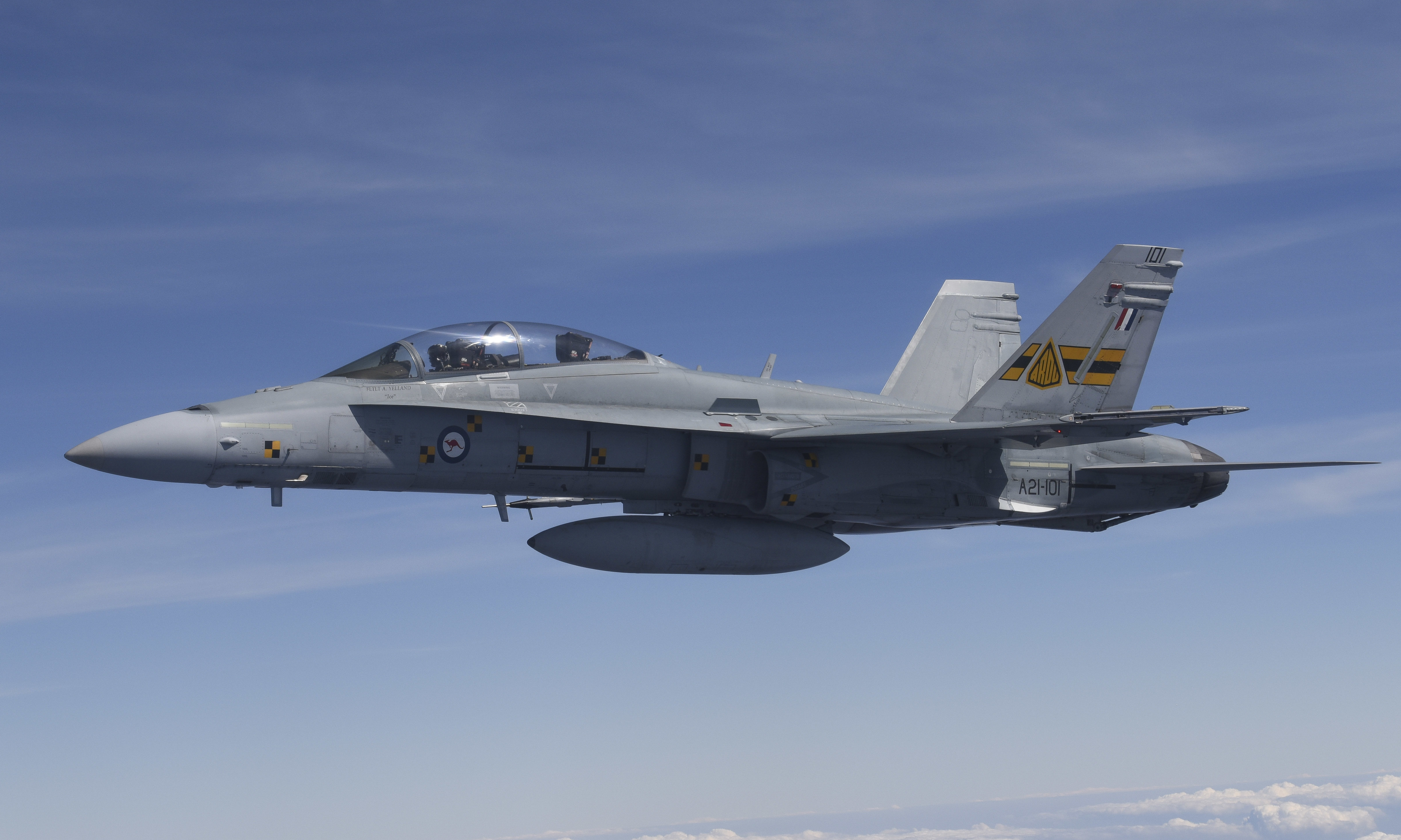
F/A-18B Hornet assigned to ARDU

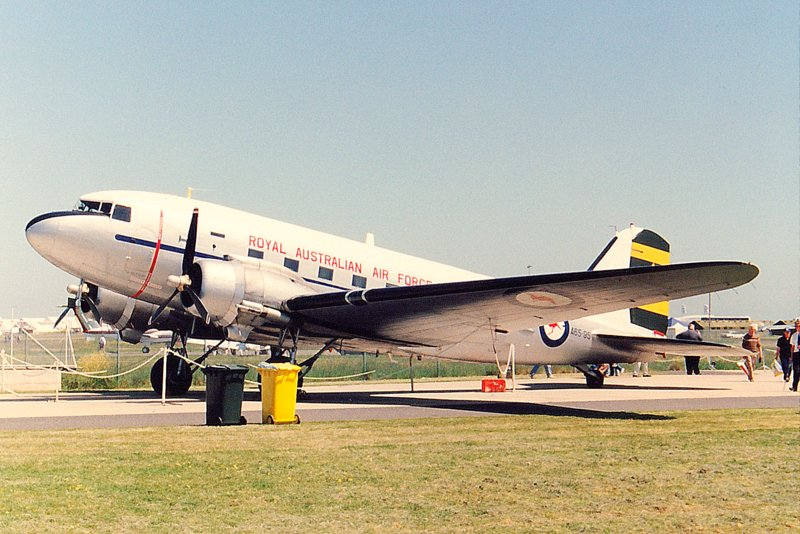
ARDU was the last RAAF unit to operate the Douglas C-47

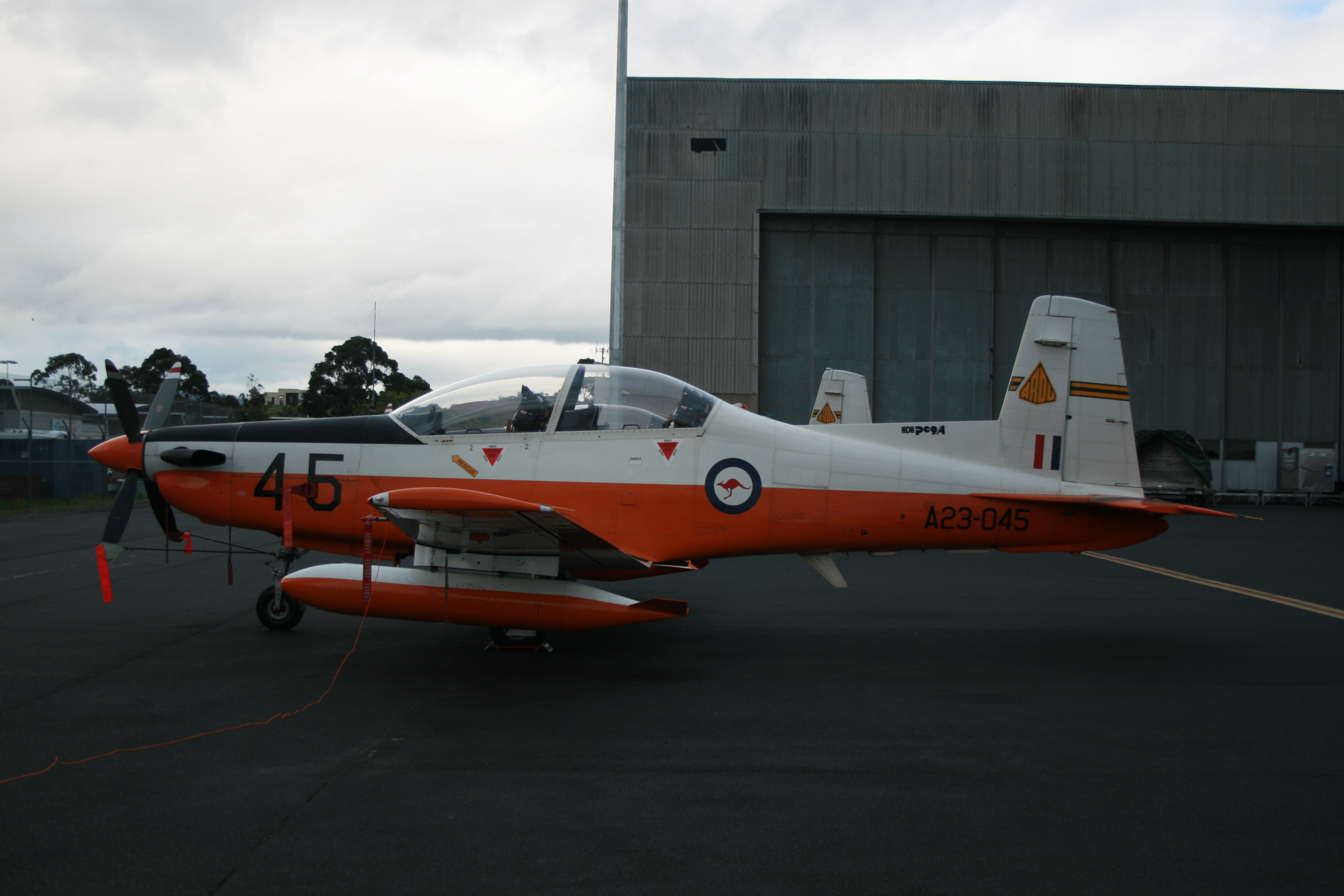
ARDU Pilatus PC-9/A

The Royal Australian Air Force's Aircraft Research and Development Unit (ARDU) plans, conducts and analyses the results of ground and flight testing of existing and new Air Force aircraft. ARDU consists of three test and evaluation flights (TEFs) located at RAAF Bases Edinburgh, Amberley and Williamtown, staffed by qualified test pilots, flight test engineers (engineer graduates of test pilot school) and flight test system specialists (air combat officer graduates of test pilot school). ARDU also conducted flight testing for the Australian Army until 2016, with Army personnel working within the unit.

The unit's flight test aircrew are long course trained at international test pilot schools including the United States Air Force Test Pilot School, the United States Naval Test Pilot School, the Empire Test Pilots' School, the École du personnel navigant d'essais et de réception and the National Test Pilot School.

The client base for ARDU encompasses the Air Mobility Group, Air Combat Group, Surveillance and Response Group, Air Force Training Group, and Defence Science and Technology Group.

ARDU often collaborates with sister AWC/TED unit Air Warfare Engineering Squadron (AWESQN). It also maintains close professional association with the other ADF flight test organisations, the Army Aviation Test and Evaluation Section (AATES) of the Army Aviation Training Centre (AAvnTC) located at Oakey, and the Navy's Aircraft Maintenance and Flight Trials Unit (AMAFTU) located at Nowra.

ARDU is now located at RAAF Base Edinburgh in Adelaide, South Australia, RAAF Base Williamtown near Newcastle, New South Wales, and RAAF Base Amberley near Brisbane, Queensland.

== History ==
Originally the formation of the Special Duties and Performance Flight (SDPF) was established in December 1941 at Laverton, Victoria. The unit was reformed as No 1 Air Performance Unit (1 APU) in December 1943, the Unit was responsible for carrying out flight trials of new aircraft as well as aircraft modifications. During World War 2, flying trials included Spitfire, Beaufighter and Boomerang performance tests, as well as evaluations on various aircraft modifications including gun, radar and bombsight installations. In addition, the Unit carried out performance tests on captured Japanese 'Oscar' and 'Tony' fighters. Following the War the Unit was involved in tests on the CA-15 prototype, a Meteor Mk3, Lincoln bomber and De-Havilland Sea Hornet.

The unit was renamed Aircraft Research and Development Unit in September 1947, with detachments operating in Victoria, South Australia and New South Wales. In October 1948 ARDU moved back to Laverton with Detachment A at Mallalla, South Australia and Detachment B at Richmond, New South Wales and Detachment C at Edinburgh, South Australia.

By February 1977, all ARDU detachments had relocated to Edinburgh, South Australia, from where it continues its vital role of testing and evaluating both aircraft and weaponry in the RAAF inventory.

In 2003, ARDU was re-formed into the Aerospace Operational Support Group (AOSG) (which later became Air Warfare Centre (AWC)), which incorporated several additional operational support roles including those relating to flight test.

On 14 Jan 2013, ARDU established an outpost at Amberley, followed by Williamtown and Richmond. Richmond was ultimately absorbed by Amberley.

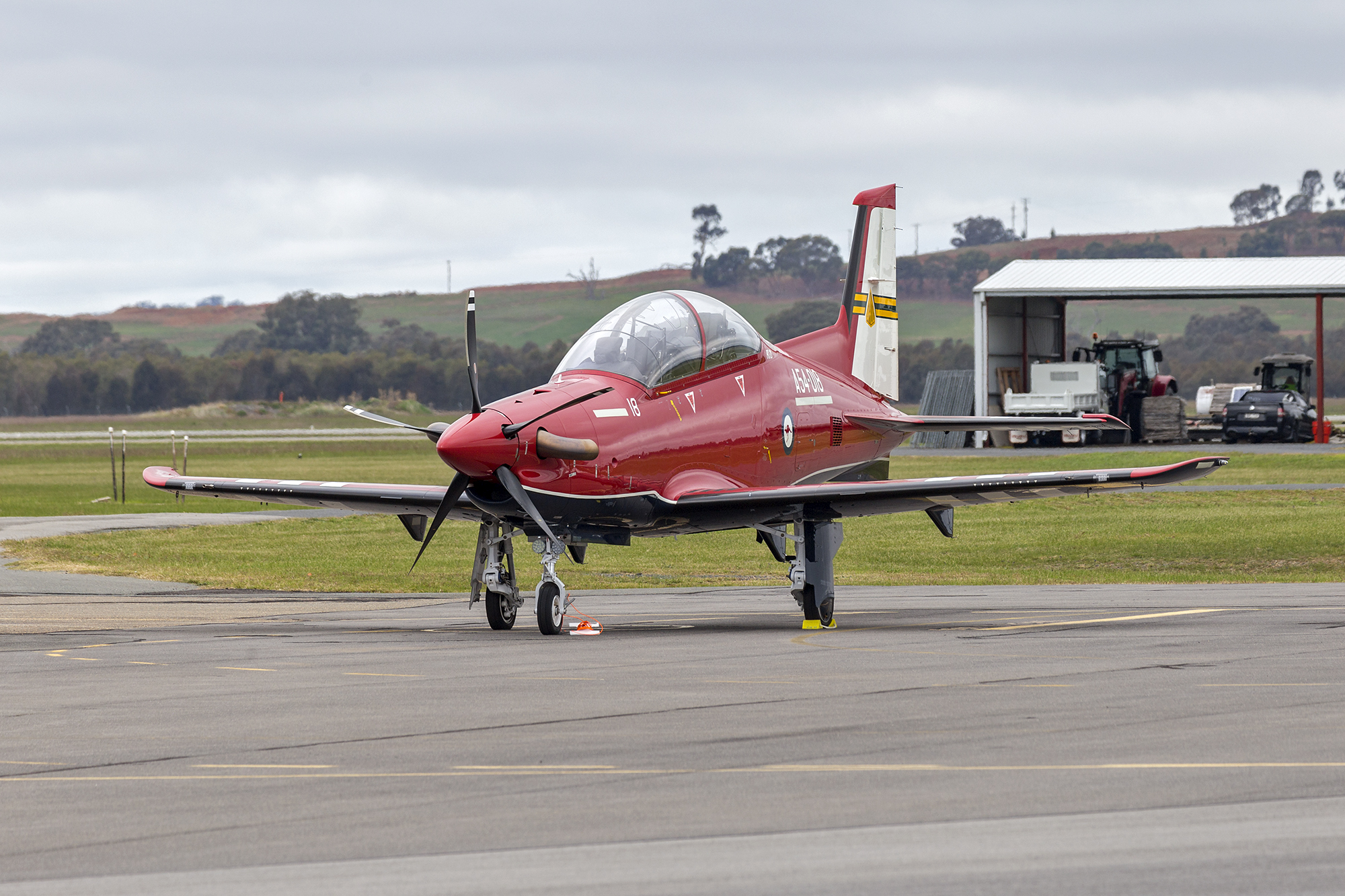
ARDU Pilatus PC-21, of which the unit received 3 in 2019 to replace its PC-9/A predecessor

== Commanding officers ==
Commanding officer	Date of appointment
Squadron Leader J.H. Harper	1 December 1943
Squadron Leader D.R. Cuming	1 May 1944
Flight Lieutenant A.I. Barret	26 January 1945
Wing Commander J.H. Harper AFC	21 March 1946
Wing Commander G.D Marchall AFC	1 December 1947
Wing Commander F.J.P. Wood	30 April 1951
Wing Commander D.R. Cuming OBE, AFC Bar	14 January 1952
Wing Commander J.R. Lavers AFC, AFM (T)	9 May 1953
Wing Commander D.R. Cuming OBE, AFC Bar	21 December 1953
Wing Commander G.H.N. Shiells DFC, AFC	9 April 1956
Wing Commander J.A. Rowland DFC, AFC (T)	19 January 1959
Group Captain I.F.D. Rose AFC	20 April 1959
Group Captain P.A. Parker DFC	1 August 1960
A/Group Captain L.H. Williamson	20 December 1963
Wing Commander W.S. McAloney GC, OBE (T)	11 November 1966
Group Captain J.P. Graney AFC	27 February 1967
Group Captain J.D. Espie DFC	10 February 1969
A/Wing Commander R.G. Green AFC (T)	1 March 1971
Group Captain J.W. Newham	4 October 1971
Wing Commander A.G. Cairns (T)	29 November 1971
Group Captain R.N. Law	18 January 1972
Wing Commander J.L. Thomson	30 July 1975
Group Captain D.G. Cameron DFC	12 January 1976
Group Captain R.G. Green AFC	10 December 1979
Group Captain M.E. McDonald	21 March 1983
Group Captain R.V. Richardson AFC	23 December 1985
Group Captain K.J. Bricknell AM	4 January 1988
Group Captain N.J. Ford	22 December 1989
Group Captain M.A. Skidmore	15 December 2000
Group Captain S.J. Fielder AM	13 December 2002
Lieutenant Colonel D.J. Fawcett	26 July 2003
Wing Commander T.J. Saunder	19 January 2004
Wing Commander S.W. Young	4 November 2004
Wing Commander A.P. Jonas	7 May 2007
Wing Commander R.L. Bender	10 January 2011
Wing Commander A.E. Figtree	1 November 2012
Wing Commander D.D.J. Rich	11 January 2016
Wing Commander M. Noblet	07 January 2019
Wing Commander S. Barter	04 January 2021
Wing Commander D. Dow	01 January 2024
Wing Commander L. McDowall	14 January 2026

== Aircraft operated by the SDPF and 1 APU only 1941 to 1947 (Pre ARDU) ==
- Spitfire (1944–1947)
- Anson
- Oxford
- Norseman
- Beaufort
- Beaufighter
- Boomerang (1943-1946)
- Woomera (1942-1945)
- Lancer (1943)
- Shrike (1943–1944)
- Hurricane (1943)
- Hudson
- Ventura
- Liberator (1944-1947)

== Fixed wing aircraft operated by ARDU ==
- Wirraway (1943-1957)
- Mustang (1944-19XX)
- Mosquito (1944–1951)
- Lincoln (1947–1959)
- Chipmunk VH-BFT (1948–1949)
- Drover VH-DHA (1948–1949)
- Meteor (1946–1956)
- Dakota (1948–2000)
- Viking A82-1 (1948–1951)
- Vampire (1948–1970)
- Sea Hornet TT213 (1948–1951)
- Freighter A81-1 (1949)
- Winjeel A85-364 (1951–19XX)
- Jindivik (1953–1955)
- Prince A90-1 (1953–1954)
- Beaver A95-201 (1955–1958)
- Canberra (1954–1981)
- Avro 707A WD280 (1956–1963)
- Sabre (1955–1971)
- Firefly T5 VX373 (1957)
- Cessna 180 (1966–1967)
- Mirage (1963–1988)
- Macchi (1969–20XX)
- CT-4 (1975–1993)
- Nomad (1975–1991)
- F/A-18 Hornet (1988–20XX)
- F-111C A8-132 (1996–20XX)
- King Air 200 VH-OYA (1999–20XX)
- PC-9/A (1999–20XX)
- KC-30A A39-003 (2011)
- PC-21 (2018–Present)

== Rotary wing aircraft operated by ARDU ==
- Sycamore (1951–1954)
- Kiowa (1971–20XX)
- Iroquois (1977–2007)
- Agusta A109E (2010–2013)
- Squirrel (1984–2006)
- Sikorsky S-51 A80-1 (1948–1951)
- Black Hawk (1987–2013)
- Tiger (2005–2010)

== See also ==
- MoD Boscombe Down
- Air Force Test Center
- Flight Test Society of Australia
