= Information Warfare Directorate RAAF =

IWD
- Active: July 2017—Present
- Branch: Royal Australian Air Force
- Role: Intelligence, Cyber and Electronic Warfare
- Part of: Air Warfare Centre
- Garrison/HQ: RAAF Base Edinburgh

The Information Warfare Directorate (IWD, formerly Information Warfare Wing) of the Royal Australian Air Force's Air Warfare Centre (AWC) is the Australian Defence Force's central institution dealing with tactical information warfare.

Although under the command of the Air Force, the IWD draws personnel from both the Australian Army and Navy. In turn the IWD develops and manages information warfare capabilities for land and maritime theatres in addition to aerospace. Within the Department of Defence there is also an Information Warfare Division (IWD), formed in 2017.

The Information Warfare Directorate is home to the Royal Australian Air Force's Intelligence, Cyber and Electronic Warfare support functions. It comprises four units (Information Warfare Capability, C4 and Battle Management Capability, Capability Support Directorate and the Joint Cyber Unit), each with specialists. The Information Warfare Directorate aims to provide asymmetric advantages to the Australian Defence Force over potential adversaries.

IWD personnel are posted to all major RAAF bases the Defence Complex in Canberra. IWD also has personnel deployed on exercises and operations, including the Middle East, on an almost continual basis.

== Units ==
As of February 2021, the Information Warfare Directorate contained the following units:

- Air Intelligence Training Unit
- No. 83 Squadron operates the Distributed Ground Station, which integrates multiple sources of intelligence.
- No. 87 Squadron produces target intelligence for other units in the Air Force.
- No. 460 Squadron assists the Australian Defence Imagery and Geospatial Organisation in the production of geospatial intelligence and precision target intelligence.
- No. 462 Squadron is a defensive cyberwarfare unit.
- No. 464 Squadron is a public relations unit.
