= Mark Skidmore =

- Born: 15 March 1959 (age 67); Kowloon, Hong Kong
- Military career
- Allegiance: Australia
- Branch: Royal Australian Air Force
- Service years: 1977–1998; 2000–2012
- Rank: Air Vice Marshal
- Nickname: Skates
- Commands: Air Commander Australia (2008–12); Aircraft Research and Development Unit (2001–02)
- Conflicts: Iraq War
- Awards: Member of the Order of Australia; Commendation for Distinguished Service

Air Vice Marshal Mark Alan Skidmore AM (born 15 March 1959) is a former senior officer of the Royal Australian Air Force. From 2008 to 2012 he was Air Commander Australia and from 2015 to 2016 he was CEO of the Civil Aviation Safety Authority.

== Early life and career ==
Skidmore was born in Kowloon, Hong Kong on 15 March 1959, and joined the Royal Australian Air Force (RAAF) as an Officer Cadet in 1977. He completed Number 113 Pilots Course and was posted to No. 1 Squadron, RAAF Base Amberley to fly the General Dynamics F-111.

Following his tour on F-111s, Skidmore undertook the United States Naval Test Pilot School Fixed Wing course in 1985. At the completion of the course he was posted to the Aircraft Research and Development Unit, RAAF Base Edinburgh, where he flew F-111, Dassault Mirage III, Macchi MB-326H, AESL CT/4A and Douglas C-47 Dakota aircraft.

In 1989, Skidmore returned to RAAF Base Amberley and completed tours at No. 1 Squadron as the Operational Flight Commander and No. 82 Wing as the Operations Officer. This was followed by a posting as the Flight Test Director on the F-111C Avionics Update Program in California, USA. Returning to Australia in 1996, he served as the Staff Officer Operational Systems at Headquarters Air Command, RAAF Base Glenbrook, before resigning from the RAAF in March 1998. Skidmore joined Aerospace Technical Services in 1998 as the Senior Test Pilot and Business Development Executive, positions he maintained following the company's acquisition in 1999 by Raytheon Systems Company.

Skidmore rejoined the RAAF in 2000 and completed the Defence Staff Course at Weston Creek before being posted again to the Aircraft Research and Development Unit, this time as the Commanding Officer. From 2003 he was Director of Operational Requirements for the New Air Combat Capability project.

Prior to assuming the position of Joint Force Air Component Commander in 2005 he attended the Defence and Strategic Studies Course at the Australian Defence College, Weston Creek. During 2005 he was deployed to the Middle East Area of Operations where he served as the Director Combined Air Operations Centre. For this service he was awarded a Commendation for Distinguished Service in the 2007 Australia Day Honours.

Skidmore was promoted to the rank of air vice marshal and appointed as the Air Commander Australia on 27 June 2008. He was made a Member of the Order of Australia in 2010.

In 2013 Skidmore test flew the RAAF Museum replica Bristol Boxkite at Point Cook, Victoria for about 1000 metres and reached a speed of 42 mph. Skidmore was quoted as saying "It was an exhilarating and humbling experience, I am honoured and proud to follow those aviators who pioneered military aviation in this country" and "I now also have the honour of being the only RAAF pilot who has flown both the fastest and slowest aircraft in the Air Force."

In October 2014 Skidmore was appointed director of aviation safety at the Civil Aviation Safety Authority (CASA). He took up the position on 1 January 2015. While CEO and director of aviation safety at CASA, Skidmore overhauled the organization's structure. He also sought to respond to industry views, issuing a timetable for regulatory changes. In August 2016, Skidmore announced he would resign from CASA in October of that year.

== Personal life ==
Skidmore is married.

Military offices
Preceded by Air Vice Marshal John Quaife	Air Commander Australia; 2008–2012	Succeeded by Air Vice Marshal Mel Hupfeld
Government offices
Preceded by John McCormick	Director of Aviation Safety at the Civil Aviation Safety Authority; 2015–2016	Succeeded by Shane Carmody
