= Air System Development and Test Wing RAAF =

DTWG
- Country: Australia
- Branch: Royal Australian Air Force
- Role: Development and Test support
- Part of: Air Warfare Centre
- Garrison/HQ: RAAF Base Edinburgh

Commanders
- Current commander: Group Captain R. Bender

The Development and Test Wing (DTWG) of the Royal Australian Air Force's Air Warfare Centre (AWC) is the Australian Defence Force's central institution responsible for the supervision, planning, project management, tasking and co-ordination of activities delivered by various units.

Although under the command of the Air Force, the DTWG draws personnel from both the Australian Air Force and the Australian Army. In turn the DTWG develops and manages test, evaluation, development and research capabilities for aerospace vehicles and support equipment.

== Units ==
The Development and Test Wing contains the following units:

- The Aircraft Research and Development Unit (ARDU) plans, conducts and analyses the results of ground and flight tests of existing and new Army and Air Force aircraft.
- The Aircraft Systems Engineering Squadron (ASE SQN) designs and develops non-standard modifications, special test equipment and facilities, and telemetry functions to support flight tests.
- The Aircraft Stores Compatibility Engineering Squadron (ASCENG SQN) is the ADF design authority for aircraft/stores compatibility and air weapons engineering.
- The RAAF Institute of Aviation Medicine (AVMED) ensures the effectiveness and safety of ADF air operations by conducting research and training ADF aircrew to understand and manage the physiological challenges of flight.
