= Hotton War Cemetery =

War cemetery in Belgium

Coordinates: 50°15′45″N 5°26′48″E

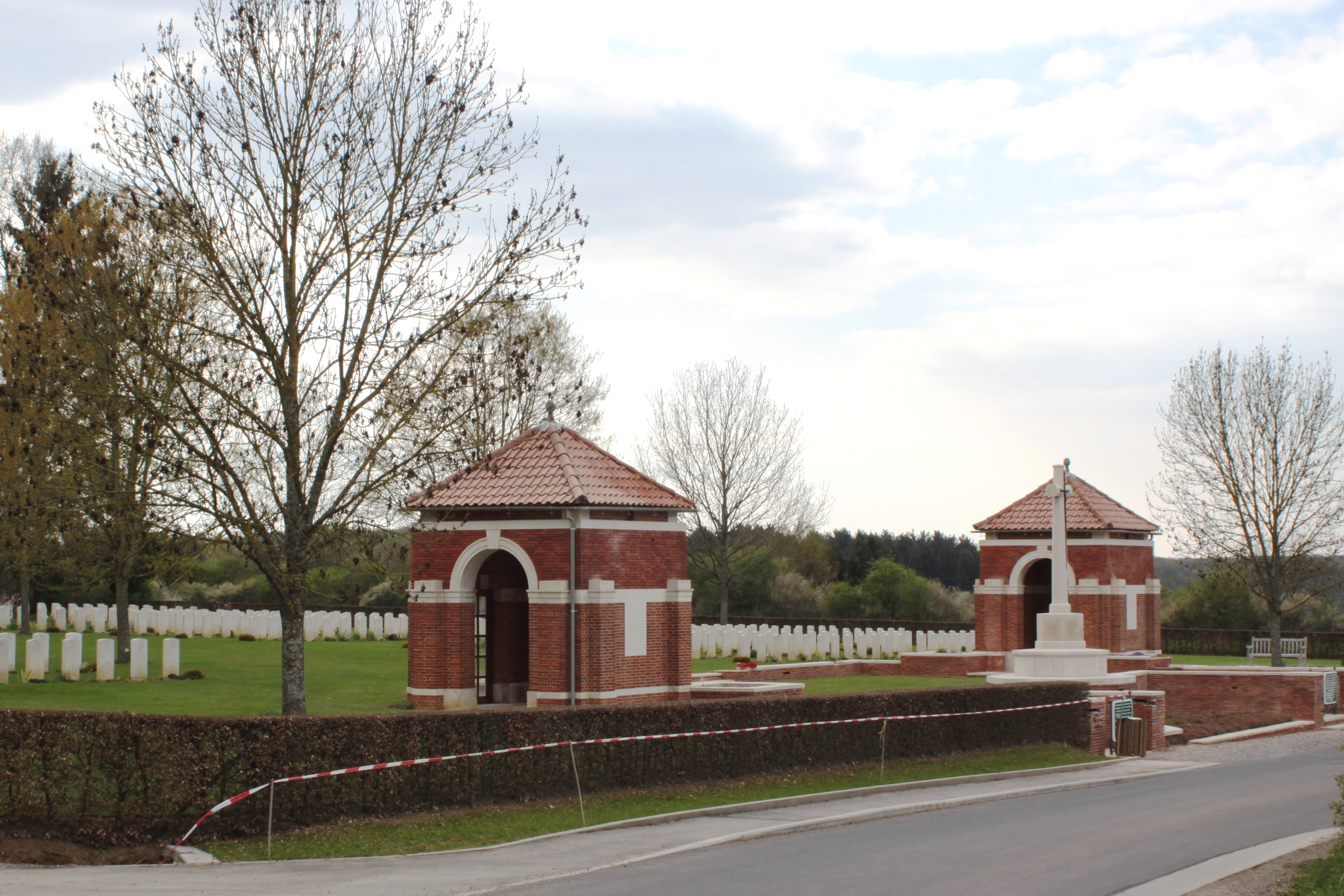
Commonwealth Military Cemetery Hotton.

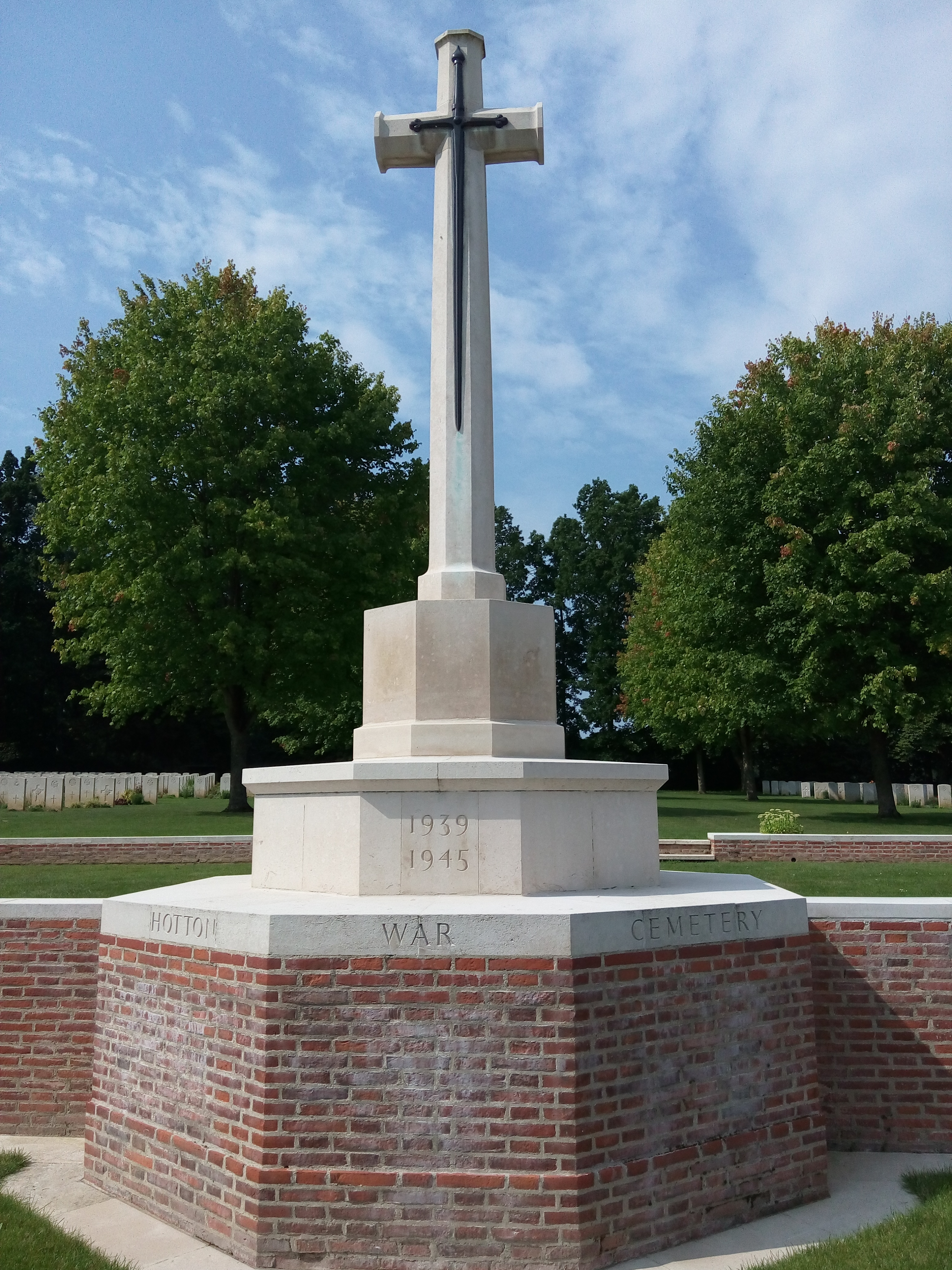
The Cross of Sacrifice in Hotton Cemetery.

Hotton War Cemetery is a Commonwealth War Graves Commission burial ground near Hotton in Belgium.

Most of the British troops who died in the battle for the Ardennes are buried here.

== Notable burials ==
- Ronald Cartland, British Member of Parliament killed in World War II
- Paul Rabone, New Zealand fighter pilot
