= RAAF Institute of Aviation Medicine =

- Active: ?
- Country: Australia
- Branch: Royal Australian Air Force
- Role: Aviation Medicine
- Part of: Air Warfare Centre Development and Test Wing
- Garrison/HQ: RAAF Base Edinburgh
- Motto(s): Salus per Scientiam ("Safety through Knowledge")

Commanders
- Current commander: Wing Commander ?

The Royal Australian Air Force Institute of Aviation Medicine (AVMED) ensures the effectiveness and safety of Australian Defence Forces (ADF) air operations by conducting research and training ADF aircrew to understand and manage the physiological challenges of flight. AVMED is currently staffed by a mixture of uniformed (RAAF and Army) and civilian personnel bringing with them diverse skills in aviation medicine, human factors, and life support.

The main functions of AVMED include:

- Aviation medicine training for aircrew, aviation-related personnel and health specialist officers.
- Aviation medicine research, development, testing and evaluation.
- Human factors in aviation.
- Central Aircrew Medical Fitness Boards and aircrew applicant medical evaluations.
- Aviation medicine consultancy services.
- An aviation medicine library.

AVMED is located at RAAF Base Edinburgh in Adelaide, South Australia.

== See also ==
- RAF Institute of Aviation Medicine
