= No. 88 Squadron RAAF =

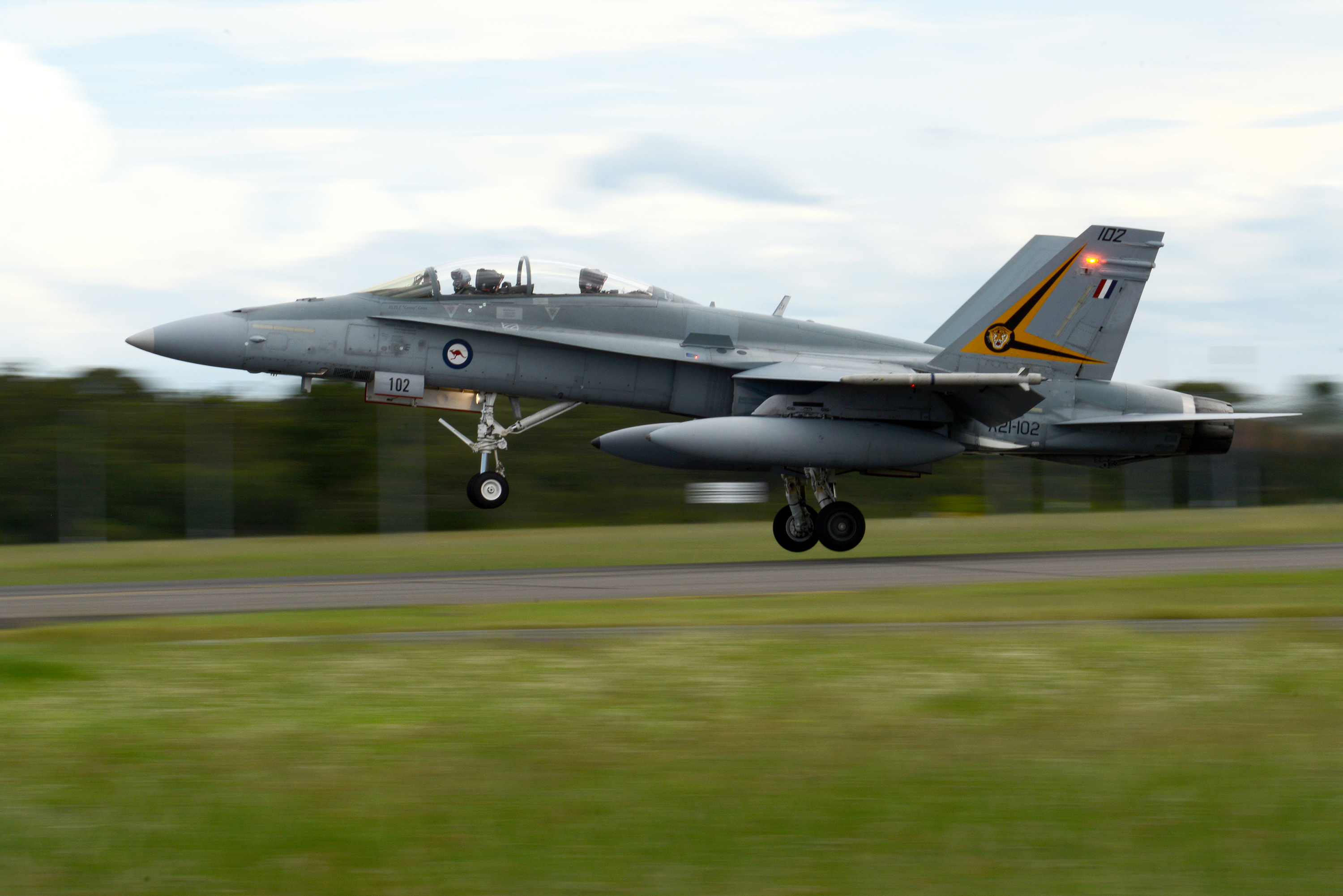
- An F/A-18B taking off from RAAF Base Williamtown during Exercise Diamond Shield in March 2017; this exercise formed part of the air warfare instructor course
- Active: 2017–current
- Branch: Royal Australian Air Force
- Role: Training and tactics development
- Base: RAAF Base Williamtown
- Motto(s): "Integrate – Tactics – Training"

No. 88 Squadron is a Royal Australian Air Force (RAAF) training unit. It is responsible for developing air combat tactics and training the RAAF's air warfare instructors, and forms part of the force's Tactics and Training Directorate.

== History and role ==
A September 2017 article in Australian Aviation stated that No. 88 Squadron was "newly formed". The squadron forms part of the RAAF's Tactics and Training Directorate, which also comprises the Air Warfare School. The directorate is an element of the Air Warfare Centre.

No. 88 Squadron is responsible for developing air combat tactics and training the RAAF's elite Air Warfare Instructors. As part of this role it conducts air warfare instructor courses. No. 88 Squadron is based at RAAF Base Williamtown; this allows it to be co-located with the headquarters of many of the RAAF's fighter and surveillance units. Each air warfare instructor course runs for five months, and training is provided in six specialist domains involving the RAAF's combat and surveillance aircraft types.

In April 2018 the squadron was awarded the perpetual Markowski Cup for being the RAAF's most proficient support unit during 2017.
