= No. 530 Squadron RAF =

- Active: 8 Sep 1942 – 25 Jan 1943
- Country: United Kingdom
- Branch: Royal Air Force
- Role: Turbinlite nightfighter squadron
- Part of: No. 11 Group RAF, Fighter Command

Insignia
- Squadron Codes: NH (Sep 1942 - Jan 1943, reported but not confirmed)

No. 530 Squadron RAF was one of the ten Turbinlite nightfighter squadrons of the Royal Air Force during the Second World War.

== History ==
No. 530 Squadron was formed at RAF Hunsdon, Hertfordshire on 8 September 1942, from No. 1451 (Turbinlite) Flight, as part of No. 11 Group RAF in Fighter Command. Instead of operating only Turbinlite and -rudimentary- Airborne Intercept (AI) radar equipped aircraft (Havocs and Bostons) and working together with a normal nightfighter unit, such as with 3 Squadron in the Flight, the unit now also flew with their own Hawker Hurricanes. It was disbanded at Hunsdon on 25 January 1943, when Turbinlite squadrons were, due to lack of success on their part and the rapid development of AI radar, thought to be superfluous.

== Aircraft operated ==
Aircraft operated by no. 530 Squadron RAF, data from
From	To	Aircraft	Version
8 September 1942	25 January 1943	Douglas Havoc	Mks.I, II
8 September 1942	25 January 1943	Douglas Boston	Mks.II, III
8 September 1942	25 January 1943	Hawker Hurricane	Mk.IIc

== Squadron bases ==
Bases and airfields used by no. 530 Squadron RAF, data from
From	To	Base
8 September 1942	25 January 1943	RAF Hunsdon, Hertfordshire

== Commanding officers ==
Officers commanding no. 530 Squadron RAF, data from
From	To	Name
8 September 1942	25 January 1943	S/Ldr. C.M. Miller, DFC

== Bibliography ==
- Delve, Ken (1994). The Source Book of the RAF. Shrewsbury, Shropshire, UK: Airlife Publishing. ISBN 1-85310-451-5.
- Flintham, Vic; Thomas, Andrew (2003). Combat Codes: A Full Explanation and Listing of British, Commonwealth and Allied Air Force Unit Codes since 1938. Shrewsbury, Shropshire, UK: Airlife Publishing Ltd. ISBN 1-84037-281-8.
- Halley, James J. (1988). The Squadrons of the Royal Air Force & Commonwealth, 1918–1988. Tonbridge, Kent, UK: Air-Britain (Historians) Ltd. ISBN 0-85130-164-9.
- Jefford, C.G. (2001). RAF Squadrons, a Comprehensive record of the Movement and Equipment of all RAF Squadrons and their Antecedents since 1912 (2nd ed.). Shrewsbury, Shropshire, UK: Airlife Publishing Ltd. ISBN 1-85310-053-6.
- Rawlings, John (1978) [1969]. Fighter Squadrons of the RAF and their Aircraft (Revised ed.). London: Macdonald and Jane's Publishers Ltd. ISBN 0-354-01028-X.
- Sturtivant, Ray, ISO; Hamlin, John (2007). RAF Flying Training And Support Units since 1912. Tonbridge, Kent, UK: Air-Britain (Historians) Ltd. ISBN 0-85130-365-X.
