= No. 28 Squadron RAAF =

Royal Australian Air Force squadron

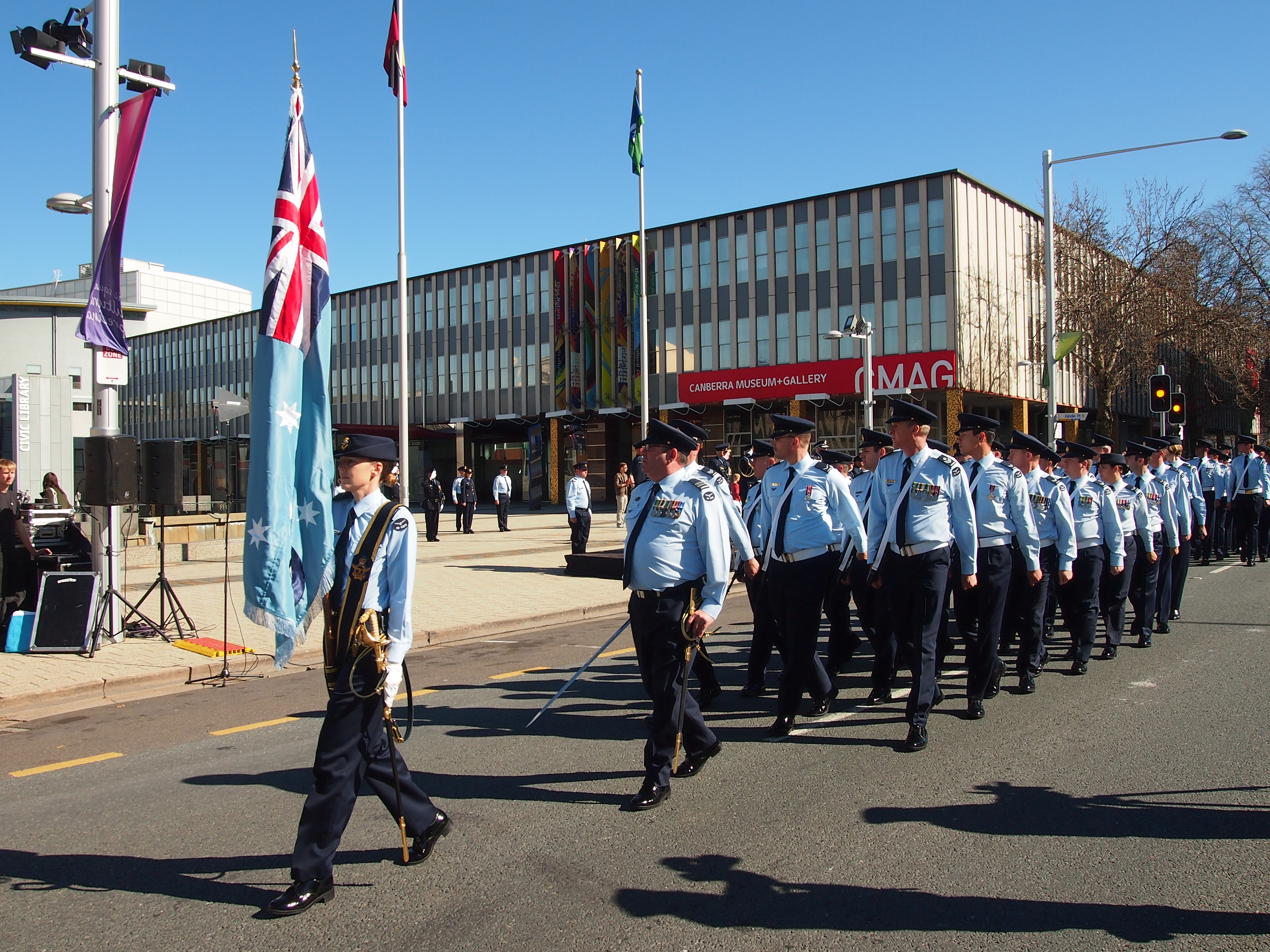
- Members of No. 28 Squadron RAAF pass by Civic Square during the unit's Freedom of the City parade in August 2013
- Active: 1983–2020
- Branch: Royal Australian Air Force
- Role: Public affairs and imagery
- Part of: Air Force Headquarters
- Garrison/HQ: HMAS Harman
- Motto(s): In Response

No. 28 Squadron was a Royal Australian Air Force (RAAF) Active Reserve squadron, based at HMAS Harman in the Australian Capital Territory. Its main role was public affairs and imagery. The squadron was formed in 1983 and disbanded in 2020.

== History ==
Raised on 1 July 1983 at RAAF Base Fairbairn, the squadron relocated to HMAS Harman upon the closure of the Fairbairn in May 2004. The squadron was initially designated as an Auxiliary unit, forming part of the Citizens Air Force, but this terminology was changed in September 1983, at which point the unit became an Active Reserve squadron.

The squadron consisted of a small group of Regular personnel who administered the Reserve elements of the unit. The majority of the Reserve personnel were tasked with various base support and other roles including communications, information technology, intelligence, logistics, and planning. From 2012 the squadron also handled most of the RAAF's public affairs capability.

The squadron had a flight based at RAAF Wagga Wagga, which was raised in 1988. The squadron also operated the RAAF's hot air balloon until that function was transferred to the Central Flying School.

On 11 September 2015, the squadron received the Governor General's banner for 25 years of service. During this period the unit had supported operations in Timor Leste, Afghanistan, Iraq and the Solomon Islands.

No. 28 Squadron was disbanded on 10 December 2020. Its public affairs function was transferred to No. 464 Squadron.
