= Hunsdon Airfield =

Airfield in Hertfordshire, England

Hunsdon Airfield ~~RAF Hunsdon~~
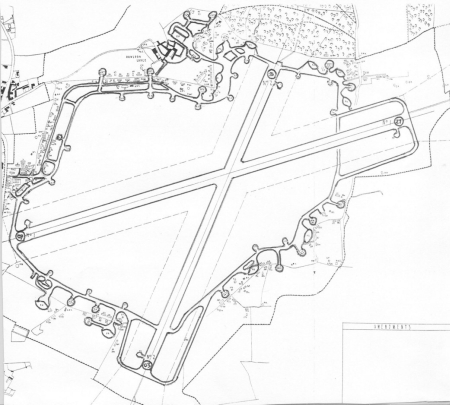
- Air Ministry Map of RAF Hunsdon
- IATA: none; ICAO: none

Summary
- Owner: Current owner unknown Air Ministry; 1941−1945
- Operator: Hunsdon Microlight Club; Royal Air Force; 1941−1945
- Location: Hunsdon, Hertfordshire, England
- Opened: 1941
- Elevation AMSL: 262 ft / 80 m
- Coordinates: 51°48′N 000°04′E

Map
- Location in Hertfordshire

Runways
Direction	Length		Surface
Direction	ft	m	Surface
03/21	4,200	1,280	Grass
09/27	5,250	1,600	Disused
08/26			Grass
14/32			Grass

Hunsdon Airfield is an airfield near Hunsdon, Hertfordshire and 2.8 miles (4.5 km) north of Harlow, Essex, England. As of 2021, it is used by a local microlight club.

The airfield was used by the Royal Air Force between 1941 and 1945 under the name of RAF Hunsdon.

== History ==
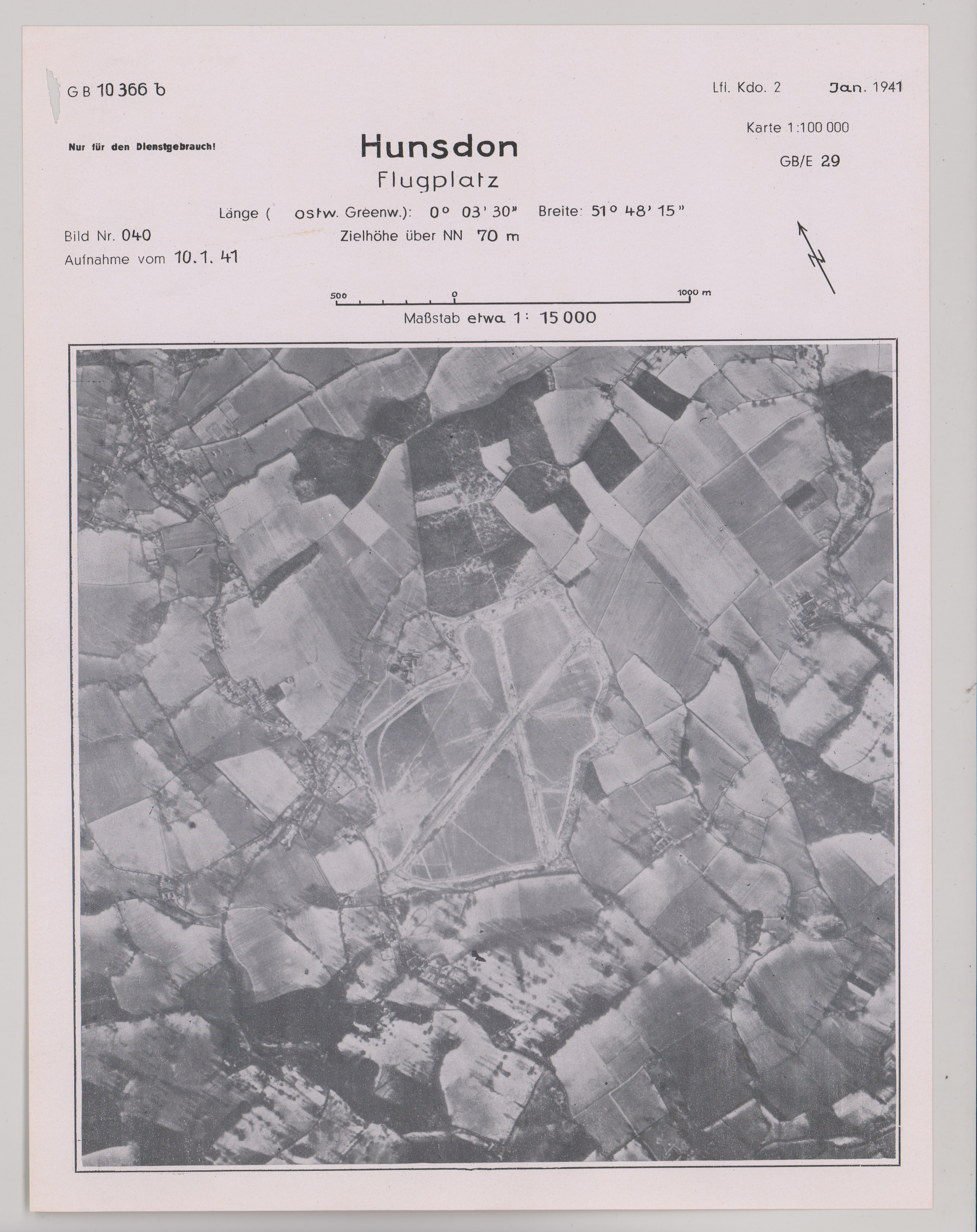
RAF Hunsdon on a target dossier of the German Luftwaffe, 1941

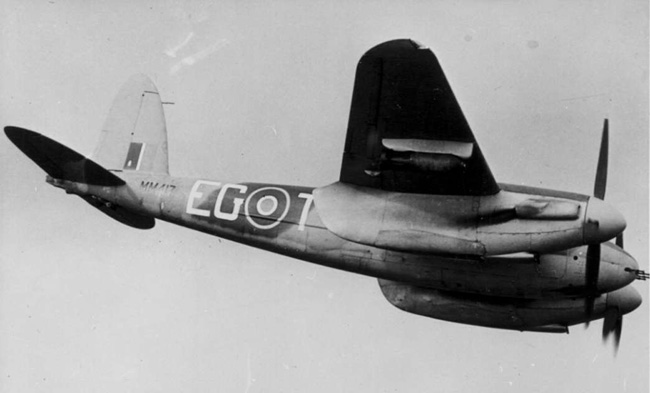
487 Squadron RNZAF

RAF Hunsdon became operational in 1941. The first unit to arrive at the Airfield (in May 1941) was No. 85 Squadron RAF, flying Boston Havocs.

In June No. 1451 Flight RAF was formed. This experimental unit flew Bostons with searchlights fitted in the nose of the aircraft. This experiment was not successful and the unit was reformed as No. 530 Squadron RAF in September 1942. Numerous Squadrons and Wings used the airfield during its operational life. Hunsdon is most closely associated, however, with the de Havilland Mosquito, which first arrived in 1943.

Hunsdon then became a significant base for Mosquito Intruder operations, where single or pairs of Mosquito fighter bombers would set out to harass German airfields and transport all across Europe.

Canadian Mosquito navigator Dave Mcintosh, who flew from Hunsdon with 418 Squadron Royal Canadian Air Force, captured the experience in his memoir "Terror in the Starboard Seat: 41 Trips Aboard a Mosquito". His account includes a minute by minute description of navigating across Denmark at fifty feet by landmarks alone.

Perhaps the most famous operation to be staged from RAF Hunsdon was on 18 February 1944, when Mosquitos from No. 21 Squadron RAF, 464 Squadron (Australia) RAF, and 487 Squadron (New Zealand) RAF, which formed No 140 Wing, 2nd Tactical Air Force (Wing Commander P C Pickard DSO DFC) carried out Operation Jericho, otherwise known as the Amiens Prison Raid.

Military flying ceased in 1945.

=== Post 1945 ===
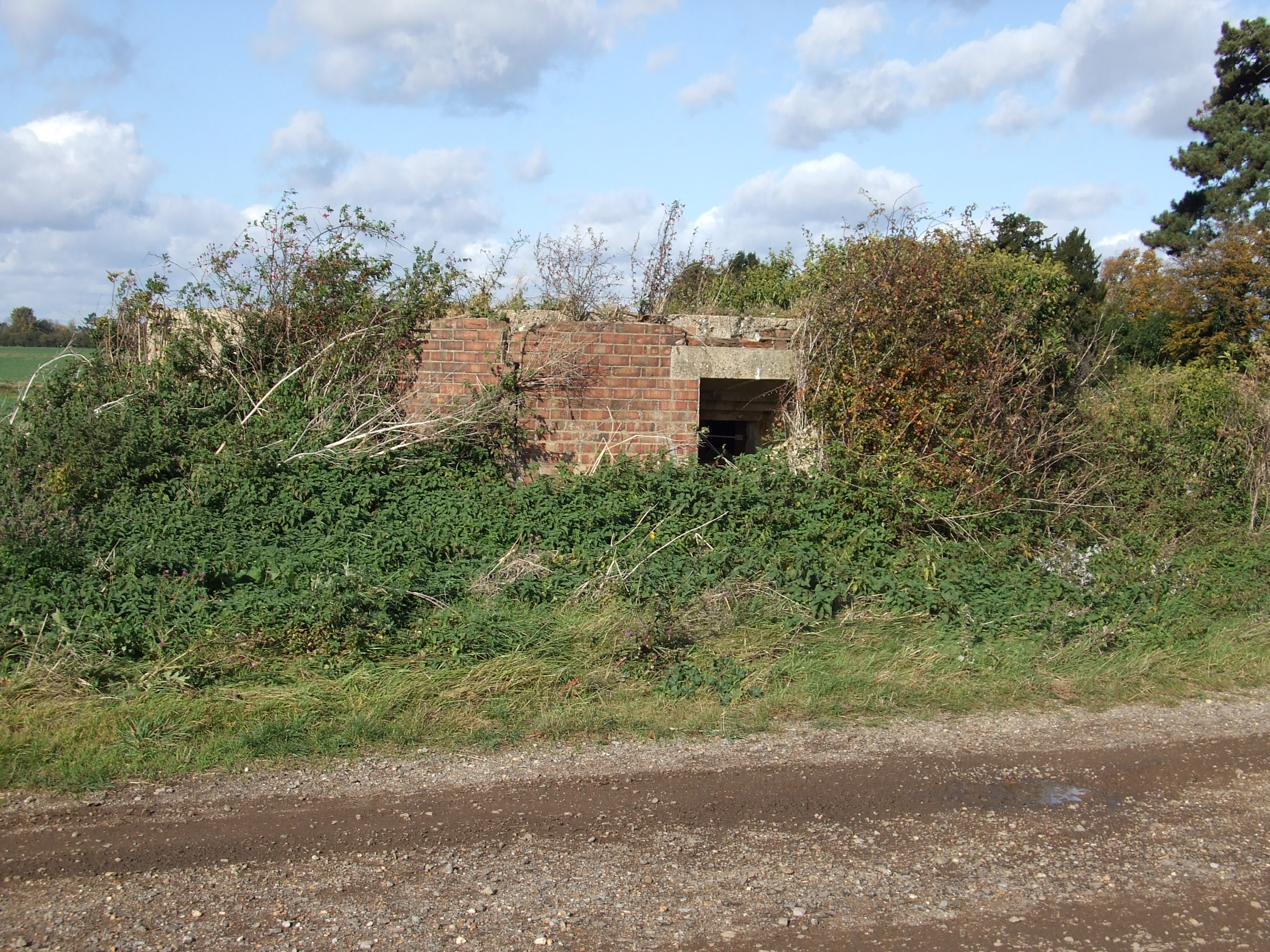
Airfield Underground Battle HQ

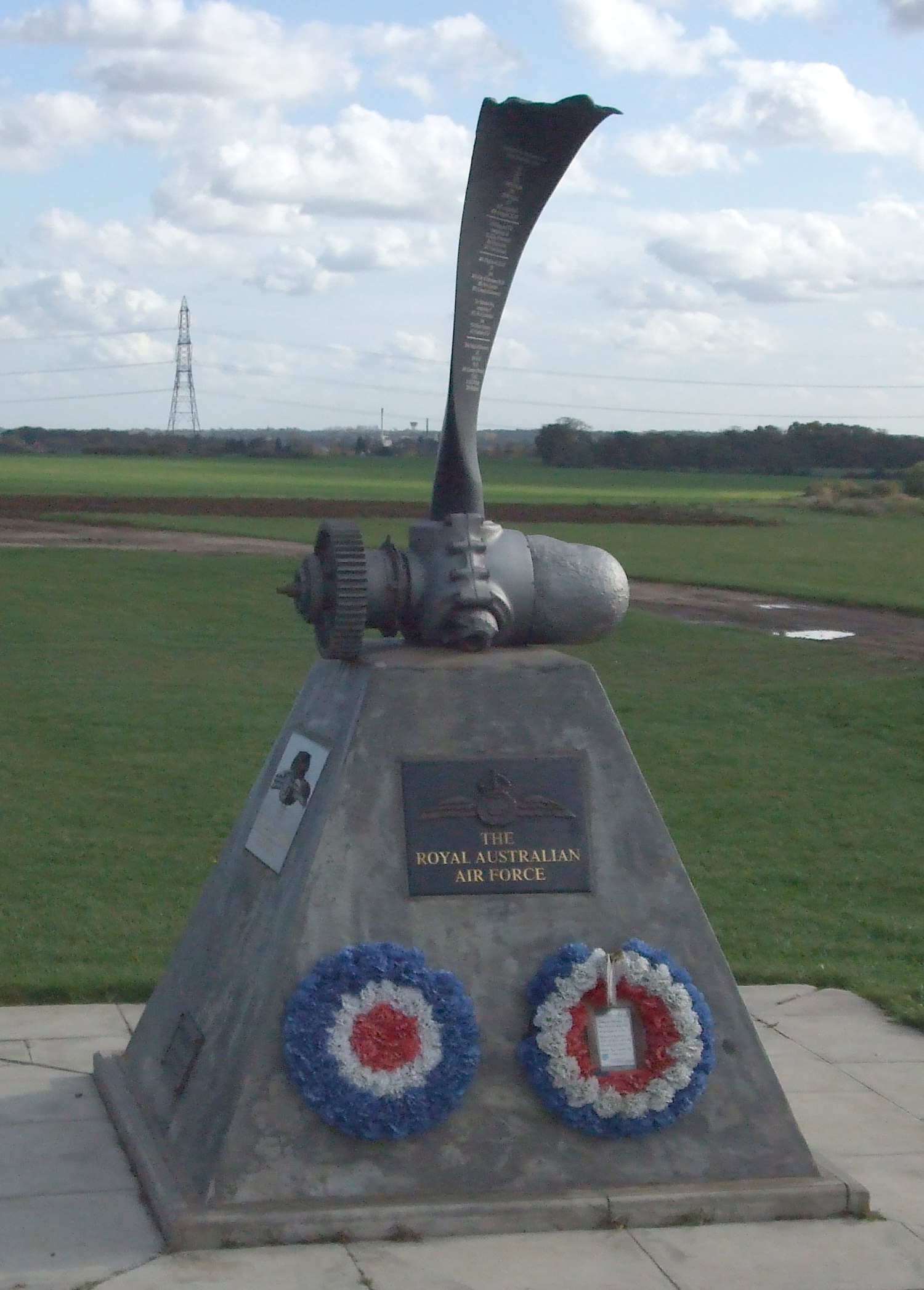
War Memorial at Hunsdon Airfield

The last remaining blister hangar at Hunsdon was demolished in the mid 2000s as it was made unsafe after the great storm of 1987.

Today only a few original buildings remain of the former RAF Hunsdon. One such building is the Underground Battle Headquarters, which was designed to provide emergency organisation of airfield defenses should the airfield come under attack. Other remaining buildings include defensive pillboxes, a brick slit trench used as a defence position, the fire tender building now used as a store for the shooting club, a complete cantilever 'Oakington' type defence position, 20mm ammunition store, and a Small arms ammunition store. All of the remaining buildings at Hunsdon Airfield are no longer accessible due to safety reasons.

On Number 3 dispersed site, there are the remains of latrines and air raid shelters. (These are on private land and permission to enter must be sought.)

On 22 May 2005, a memorial was unveiled and dedicated to the groundcrew, aircrew and support staff who were based at RAF Hunsdon from 1941 to 1945.

In June 2012 a new memorial commemorating the 126 air and ground crew who died while flying from or serving at RAF Hunsdon was unveiled.

The original runways are now considerably reduced in length. Hunsdon Microlight Club uses the three grass runways for microlight flying.

== Units based at RAF Hunsdon ==
RAF units based here during the Second World War are:

- No. 140 Airfield Headquarters RAF became No. 140 Wing RAF of the RAF Second Tactical Air Force
  - No. 21 Squadron RAF
  - No. 464 Squadron RAAF
  - No. 487 Squadron RNZAF
- No. 1451 Flight RAF
- No. 1530 (Beam Approach Training) Flight RAF
- Hunsdon Wing
  - No. 611 (West Lancashire) Squadron AAF
  - No. 154 (Motor Industries) Squadron
  - No. 442 Squadron RCAF
- No. 4 Casualty Air Evacuation Unit
- No. 9 Personnel Despatch Centre
- No. 147 (Night Fighter) Wing RAF
- No. 148 (Night Fighter) Wing RAF
- No. 1459 (Fighter) Flight RAF
- No. 2715 Squadron RAF Regiment
- No. 2725 Squadron RAF Regiment
- No. 2727 Squadron RAF Regiment
- No. 2730 Squadron RAF Regiment
- No. 2734 Squadron RAF Regiment
- No. 2787 Squadron RAF Regiment
- No. 2812 Squadron RAF Regiment
- No. 3202 Servicing Commando
- No. 3207 Servicing Commando

=== Squadron table ===
Ensign	Squadron	Aircraft	From	To	To	Notes
United Kingdom	No. 3 Squadron	Hawker Hurricane IIB; Hawker Hurricane IIC; Hawker Typhoon IB	9 August 1941; 9 August 1941; February 1943	October 1941; February 1943; 14 May 1943	RAF West Malling	Detachments at RAF Manston and RAF Shoreham.
United Kingdom	No. 29 Squadron	de Havilland Mosquito XIII	19 June 1944	22 February 1945	RAF Colerne.	Squadron Code:RO.
United Kingdom	No. 85 Squadron	Douglas Boston I Douglas Boston II de Havilland Mosquito II de Havilland Mosquito XV de Havilland Mosquito XII	3 May 1941; July 1941; August 1942; March 1943; March 1943	November 1941; September 1942; 13 May 1943; 13 May 1943; 13 May 1943	RAF West Malling.	Squadron Code:VY.
United Kingdom	No. 107 Squadron	Bristol Blenheim IV	3 May 1939	3 March 1941	RAF Leuchars	As an detachment from RAF Wattisham.
United Kingdom	No. 285 Squadron	Hawker Hurricane IIC; North American Mustang I	4 January 1945; February 1945	20 June 1945	RAF Weston Zoyland	As a detachment from RAF North Weald.
United Kingdom	No. 287 Squadron	Bristol Blenheim IV; Lockheed Hudson III; Westland Lysander III; Hawker Hurricane I/IIB/IV; Miles Master III; Boulton Paul Defiant I/III; Airspeed Oxford; Miles Martinet; Supermarine Spitfire VB; Bristol Beaufighter VI; Supermarine Spitfire IX; Hawker Tempest V	19 Nov 1941; 19 Nov 1941; 19 Nov 1941; 19 Nov 1941; 19 Nov 1941; 19 Nov 1941; 19 Nov 1941; 19 Nov 1941; 19 Nov 1941; 3 May 1945; 3 May 1945; 3 May 1945	3 July 1944; 3 July 1944; 3 July 1944; 3 July 1944; 3 July 1944; 3 July 1944; 3 July 1944; 3 July 1944; 3 July 1944; 15 June 1945; 15 June 1945; 15 June 1945	RAF North Weald RAF Bradwell Bay	As a detachment from RAF Croydon As a detachment from RAF Hornchurch.
	No. 410 Squadron	de Havilland Mosquito II de Havilland Mosquito XIII	8 November 1943; 29 April 1944	30 December 1943; 18 June 1944	RAF Castle Camps; RAF Zeals.	Squadron Code: RA
	No. 442 Squadron	North American Mustang III	23 March 1945	17 May 1945	RAF Digby.	Squadron Code:?.
New Zealand	No. 487 Squadron	de Havilland Mosquito VI	31 December 1943	18 April 1944	RAF Gravesend.	Squadron Code:EG.
New Zealand	No. 488 Squadron	de Havilland Mosquito XXX	9 October 1944	15 November 1944	B 48/Amiens/Glisy.	Squadron Code:ME.
United Kingdom	No. 515 Squadron	Boulton Paul Defiant II; Bristol Beaufighter IIF	1 June 1943	15 December 1943	RAF Little Snoring.	Squadron Code:?.
United Kingdom	No. 530 Squadron	Douglas Boston II (Turbinlite); Douglas Boston III (Turbinlite); Hawker Hurricane IIC	8 September 1942	25 January 1943	Disbanded	This squadron only used Hunsdon during its timespan.

=== Brief Stays ===
Ensign	Squadron	Aircraft	From	To	To	Notes
United Kingdom	No. 21 Squadron	de Havilland Mosquito VI	31 December 1943	17 April 1944	RAF Gravesend.	Squadron Code:YH.
United Kingdom	No. 151 Squadron	de Havilland Mosquito XXX	19 November 1944	1 March 1945	RAF Bradwell Bay.	Squadron Code:DZ.
United Kingdom	No. 154 (Motor Industries) Squadron	North American Mustang IV	1 March 1945	19 March 1945	Disbanded.	Squadron Code:HG.
United Kingdom	No. 219 (Mysore) Squadron	de Havilland Mosquito XXX	29 August 1944	10 October 1944	B 48 Amiens/Glisy.	Squadron Code:FK.
United Kingdom	No. 264 (Madras Presidency) Squadron	de Havilland Mosquito XIII	26 July 1944	11 August 1944	A 8/Picauville.	Squadron Code:?.
	No. 409 Squadron	de Havilland Mosquito XXX	1 March 1944	14 May 1944	RAF West Malling.	Squadron Code:?.
	No. 418 Squadron	de Havilland Mosquito II de Havilland Mosquito VI	28 August 1944; November 1944	November 1944; 21 November 1944	RAF Blackbushe.	Squadron Code:TH.
	No. 441 Squadron	Supermarine Spitfire IX	27 April 1945	17 May 1945	RAF Digby.	Squadron Code:?.
Australia	No. 464 Squadron	de Havilland Mosquito VI	9 April 1944	17 April 1944	RAF Gravesend.	Squadron Code:SB.
United Kingdom	No. 501 (County of Gloucester) Squadron AAF	Hawker Tempest V	3 March 1945	20 April 1945	Disbanded.	Squadron Code:SD.
United Kingdom	No. 605 (County of Warwick) Squadron AAF	Douglas Boston III	July 1942	February 1943	RAF Castle Camps	As an detachment from RAF Ford.
United Kingdom	No. 611 (West Lancashire) Squadron AAF	North American Mustang IV	3 March 1945	7 May 1945	RAF Peterhead.	Squadron Code:FY.

== See also ==
- List of former Royal Air Force stations
