= No. 464 Squadron RAAF =

Royal Australian Air Force squadron

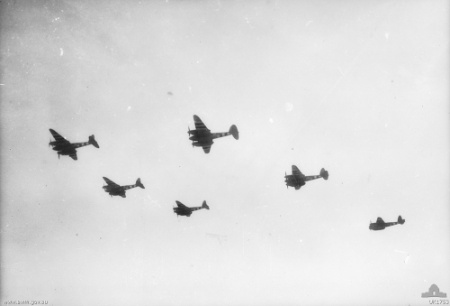
- Mosquitos of No. 464 Squadron RAAF set out on a mission over France, August 1944
- Active: 1 September 1942 – 25 September 1945; January 2021 – current
- Country: Australia
- Branch: Royal Australian Air Force
- Role: Bomber squadron (1942 – 1945); Public relations (2020 – current)
- Part of: No. 2 Group RAF, Bomber Command (September 1942 – July 1943); No. 2 Group RAF, 2nd Tactical Air Force (Jul 1943 – Sep 1945); Information Warfare Directorate (2020 – current)
- Headquarters: HMAS Harman Canberra
- Mottos: Aequo animo (Latin: "Equanimity")
- Battle honours: Fortress Europe, 1940–1944 France and Germany, 1944–1945; Normandy, 1944 Rhine

Insignia
- Squadron badge heraldry: A demi piping shrike
- Squadron code: SB (August 1942 – September 1945)

Aircraft flown
- Bomber: Lockheed Ventura de Havilland Mosquito

No. 464 Squadron RAAF is a Royal Australian Air Force (RAAF) unit responsible for public relations. It was originally formed in the United Kingdom during 1942 as a bomber unit. It comprised personnel from Australia, Britain, Canada, New Zealand, South Africa and the Netherlands, the squadron served in the light bomber role, undertaking operations over France and the Low Countries, from bases in England. It also flew night fighter missions. Later, following the Allied invasion of France, the squadron moved to France where it was used to interdict German transports and infrastructure. It further engaged in several low-level precision raids against Gestapo targets in France and Denmark. The squadron was disbanded in September 1945, following the conclusion of the war. No. 464 Squadron was re-formed in January 2021 when the RAAF's public relations functions were transferred from No. 28 Squadron.

== History ==
=== World War II ===
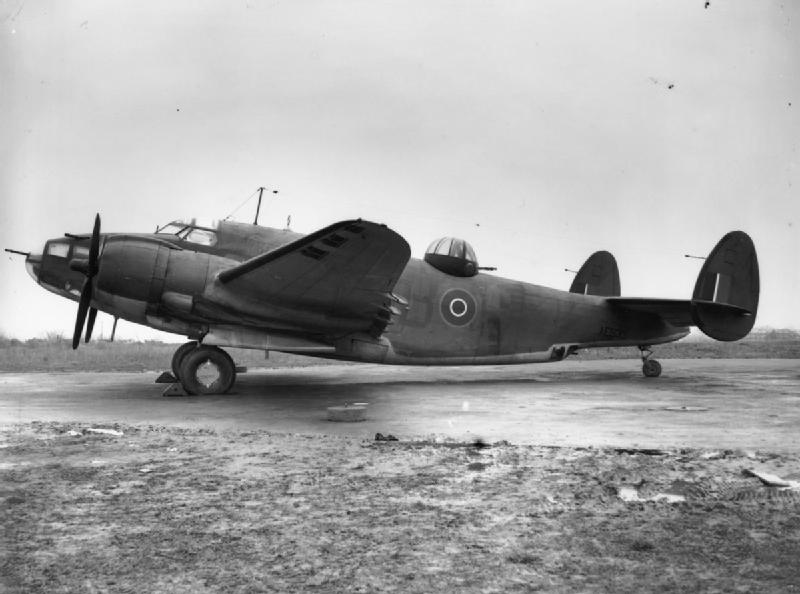
464 Squadron Ventura at RAF Feltwell

The squadron was officially formed on 1 September 1942 at RAF Feltwell, Norfolk in the United Kingdom, as an Article XV squadron under the Empire Air Training Scheme. Although technically a squadron of the RAAF, its personnel were drawn from many countries and upon formation only about 30 per cent were Australian. This fluctuated and later in the war this grew to just over 50 per cent. Upon formation, the squadron's first commanding officer was a South African, Wing Commander Ronald Young. No. 464 Squadron was initially equipped with Lockheed Ventura medium bombers, and participated in its first operation on 6 December. Dubbed Operation Oyster, it was an attack on the Philips radio valve factory at Eindhoven, in the Netherlands. The squadron lost three aircraft to anti-aircraft fire during the attack, but inflicted significant damage on the target.

After moving to RAF Methwold in April 1943, the squadron conducted raids over France, focused upon drawing out German fighter aircraft which were then destroyed by the Ventura's fighter escort. On 1 June, No. 464 Squadron was transferred from RAF Bomber Command to the Second Tactical Air Force. Concerns about the vulnerability of the Ventura, however, led to their withdrawal and in July, the squadron was re-equipped with the more suitable de Havilland Mosquito. Based out of RAF Sculthorpe, the squadron became operational with these aircraft on 3 October, successfully attacking a power station in France for the loss of no aircraft.

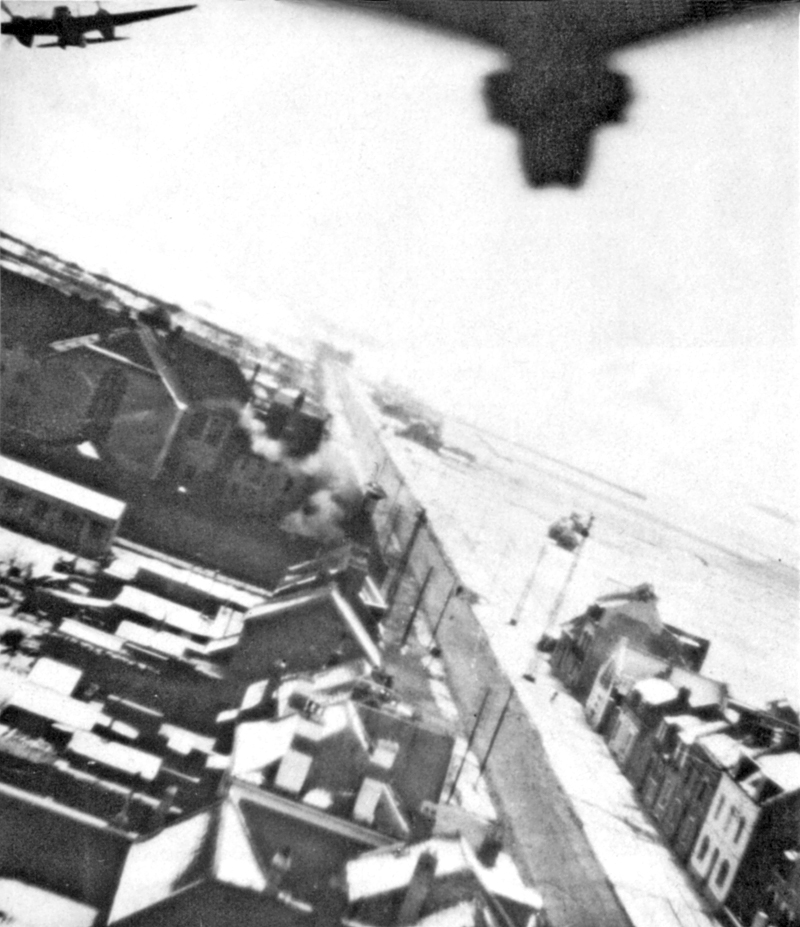
Anzac Mosquitoes over Amiens during Operation Jericho.

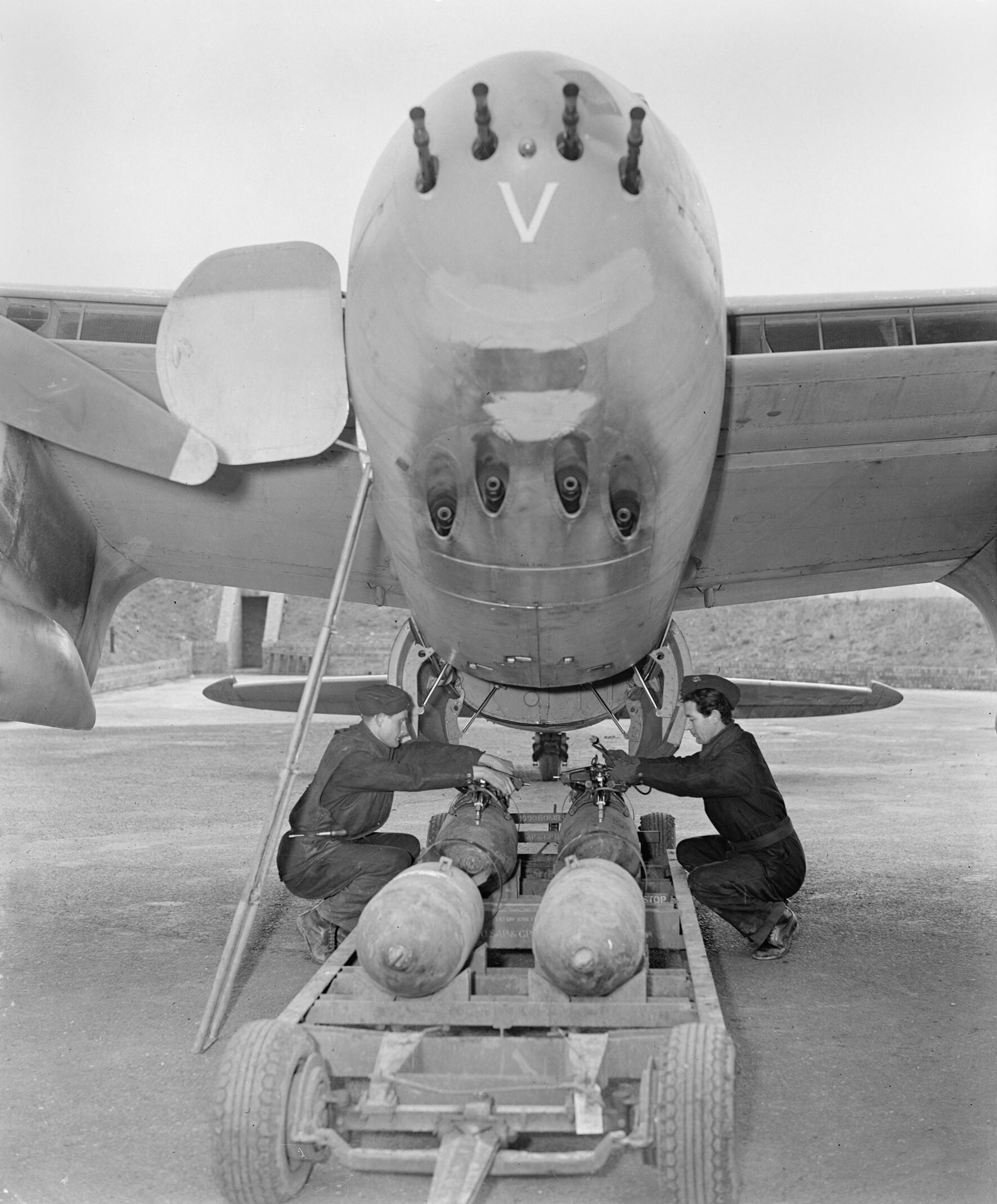
Bombing up a 464 Squadron Mosquito FB Mk VI at RAF Hunsdon

Following this, the squadron carried out attack operations during the day and "intruder" operations during the night, destroying several German aircraft in the air. In December 1943, the squadron moved to RAF Hunsdon, where they formed part of No. 140 Wing along with No. 21 Squadron RAF and No. 487 Squadron RNZAF. In early 1944, still based out of Hunsdon, No. 464 Squadron concentrated on attacking V-1 flying bomb launch sites and gained a reputation for highly accurate bombing. This reputation lead it to be selected for Operation Jericho, which was the first of a number of precision attacks that the squadron made on Gestapo targets in occupied Europe. In this mission, aircraft from the squadron formed part of the force which breached the walls of a Gestapo prison at Amiens, France on 18 February 1944 allowing members of the French Resistance to escape. The squadron's activities were intensified from April as part of the preparations for the Allied invasion of Europe. It struck railway infrastructure, bridges, road transport and convoys. In contrast with its previous operations, these sorties were often conducted during daylight.

The squadron continued to attack transport and communications targets from June 1944 to support the invasion; in this role it was a prominent part of the Australian contribution to the Battle of Normandy. This was one of its busiest periods during the war and in the first week after D-Day, the squadron's aircraft flew 75 sorties; over the course of the whole month it lost five aircraft. On the 11 June, at the request of the SAS Operation Bulbasket and French Resistance, Mosquitos of No. 464 Squadron, based at RAF Gravesend in Kent, attacked and destroyed a train composed of at least eleven petrol tankers that was parked at the rail sidings at Châtellerault. These were the fuel reserves for the advancing 2nd SS Panzer Division that was heading towards Normandy. For the next two months, the squadron's operations intensified further. Throughout July it flew more than 350 sorties. Perhaps the most noteworthy of these came on 14/15 July 1944, when four aircraft from the squadron attacked the Gestapo barracks at Bonneuil-Matours in a night-time attack in reprisal for the execution of 34 SAS, 9 French Resistance, and a downed USAAF pilot who were on Operation Bulbasket. In August, No. 464 Squadron flew 400 sorties, concentrating mainly upon carrying out night-time attacks on German transports and infrastructure in France. Three aircraft were lost during this time.

Later, on 31 October, another precision low-level attack was made, this time on the Gestapo complex at the Aarhus University in Aarhus, Denmark. No. 464 Squadron moved from England to France in February 1945 and, based out of Rosières-en-Santerre, continued day and night bombing missions. The following month, on 21 March in Operation Carthage, six of the squadron's Mosquitos attacked Gestapo headquarters at the Shellhus in Copenhagen, Denmark, heavily damaging the building while losing two aircraft. The squadron moved to a base at Melsbroek in Belgium on 17 April. It then continued to carry out regular operations. Its final operation of the war came on 2 May 1945.

Following the German surrender a No. 464 Squadron aircraft carried German Colonel General Alfred Jodl and a number of other prominent officials to Berlin. No. 464 Squadron RAAF was disbanded at Melsbroek on 25 September 1945.

The squadron is credited with having attacked 2,353 separate targets during the war. The RAAF Historical Section has written that its aircraft flew "3,067 sorties, 7,967 operational hours and 1,835,008 miles". In so doing it lost 102 personnel killed in action, 33 of whom were Australian. Its members were awarded a number of decorations. Those that were bestowed upon Australians include: 14 Distinguished Flying Crosses with one bar and three Distinguished Flying Medals.

=== Re-establishment ===
No. 464 Squadron was re-formed at RAAF Base Glenbrook on 1 January 2021. It assumed responsibility for public relations duties from No. 28 Squadron, which was disbanded in December 2020. The squadron forms part of the RAAF Air Warfare Centre's Information Warfare Directorate. The squadron includes regular and reservist personnel. While its headquarters is located at RAAF Base Glenbrook, most of the squadron's personnel are posted to other RAAF bases.

== Aircraft operated ==
Aircraft operated by no. 464 Squadron RAAF
| From | To | Aircraft | Version |
|---|---|---|---|
| September 1942 | July 1943 | Lockheed Ventura | Mks.I & II |
| July 1943 | September 1945 | de Havilland Mosquito | Mk.VI |

== Squadron bases ==
Bases and airfields used by no. 464 Squadron RAAF
| From | To | Base |
|---|---|---|
| 1 September 1942 | 3 April 1943 | RAF Feltwell, Norfolk |
| 3 April 1943 | 21 July 1943 | RAF Methwold, Norfolk |
| 21 July 1943 | 31 December 1943 | RAF Sculthorpe, Norfolk |
| 31 December 1943 | 25 March 1944 | RAF Hunsdon, Hertfordshire |
| 25 March 1944 | 8 April 1944 | RAF Swanton Morley, Norfolk |
| 8 April 1944 | 17 April 1944 | RAF Hunsdon, Hertfordshire |
| 17 April 1944 | 18 June 1944 | RAF Gravesend, Kent |
| 18 June 1944 | 5 February 1945 | RAF Thorney Island, West Sussex |
| 5 February 1945 | 17 April 1945 | B.87/Rosières-en-Santerre, France |
| 17 April 1945 | 25 September 1945 | B.58/Melsbroek, Belgium |
| 1 January 2021 | | RAAF Base Glenbrook |

== Commanding officers ==
Officers commanding no. 464 Squadron RAAF
| From | To | Name |
|---|---|---|
| 1 September 1942 | 26 April 1943 | Wing Commander Ronald Hillyard 'Bob' Young, DSO, AFC, RAF |
| 27 April 1943 | 5 January 1944 | Wing Commander Henry John Walter 'Jack' Meakin, DFC, RAF |
| 6 January 1944 | 21 June 1944 | Wing Commander Robert Wilson 'Bob' Iredale, DFC, RAAF |
| 22 June 1944 | 22 August 1944 (KIA) | Wing Commander Gordon 'Peter' Panitz, DFC, RAAF |
| 23 August 1944 | 14 January 1945 | Wing Commander Arthur Wellesley 'Bill' Langton, DFC, AFC, RAF |
| 15 January 1945 | 27 September 1945 | Wing Commander Noel Fraser Vincent, DFC, RAAF |
| 1 January 2021 | 15 January 2023 | Wing Commander Fiona Van Der Snoek, RAAF |
| 15 January 2024 | Current | Wing Commander Peter Croce, RAAF |

== See also ==
- Ramrod 16 - an operation flown as a diversion for 464 Squadron
