= Air Warfare Centre RAAF =

Force element group of the Royal Australian Air Force

Air Warfare Centre
- Air Warfare Centre's crest
- Active: 2016 – present
- Branch: Royal Australian Air Force
- Part of: Air Command
- Garrison/HQ: RAAF Base Edinburgh
- Motto: Ready the Warfighter

The Air Warfare Centre (AWC) is a Force Element Group of the Royal Australian Air Force (RAAF) based at RAAF Base Edinburgh. It was formerly titled the Aerospace Operational Support Group (AOSG) and was reformed into the AWC in 2016.

The role of the AWC is similar to the AOSG and whilst it still conducts research and development on defence systems such as aircraft and weapons at the Woomera Test Range (WTR), it has expanded its role to address opportunities to improve Air Force's ability to maximise the operational effectiveness of fifth-generation, networked capabilities through improved integration across Defence and increased knowledge sharing with allied AWCs.

== Units ==
As of February 2021, the Air Warfare Centre comprised:

- Test and Evaluation Directorate
  - Aircraft Research and Development Unit
  - Air Warfare Engineering Squadron
  - Institute of Aviation Medicine
  - Aeronautical Information Service – Air Force
- Cyber and Electronic Warfare Directorate
  - Joint Electronic Warfare Operational Support Unit
  - Joint Survivability and Tactics Validation Unit
  - No. 80 Squadron
  - No. 462 Squadron
- Information Warfare Directorate
  - Air Intelligence Training Unit
  - No. 83 Squadron
  - No. 87 Squadron
  - No. 460 Squadron
  - No. 464 Squadron
- Tactics and Training Directorate
  - Air Warfare School
  - No. 88 Squadron
