= No. 1422 Flight RAF =

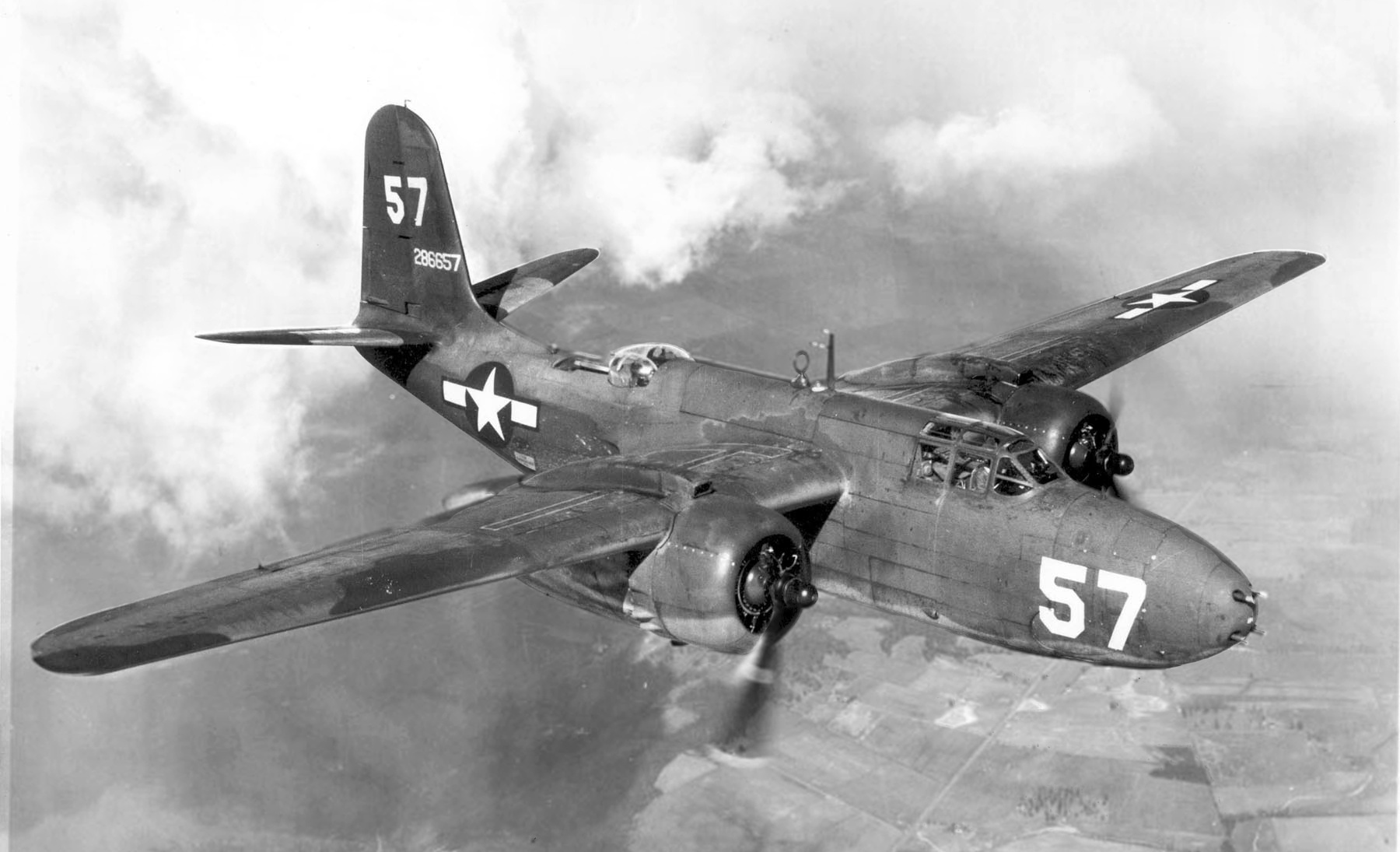
- A USAAF Douglas A-20G Havoc similar to those flown by 1422 Flight
- Active: 12 May 1941 – 3 June 1944
- Country: United Kingdom
- Branch: Royal Air Force
- Role: Experimental Night fighter

Aircraft flown
- Bomber: Vickers Wellington
- Fighter: Douglas Havoc (Turbinlite); Douglas Boston de Havilland Mosquito Mk.II (Turbinlite); Boulton Paul Defiant; Hawker Hurricane
- Trainer: de Havilland Tiger Moth; Avro Anson de Havilland Dominie

No. 1422 (Night Fighter) Flight was an independent Royal Air Force flight, used to test night fighting techniques and tactics.

== History ==
The unit started originally as No. 422 (Fighter Interception) Flight, formed on 14 October 1940 at RAF Shoreham to study the use of single-seat night fighters That unit went up into No. 96 Squadron RAF on 18 December 1940.

The unit was reformed as No. 1422 (Night Fighter) Flight at RAF Heston on 12 May 1941, equipped with a variety of night fighters for trials and experimental work. Tactics were developed here for the Turbinlite Douglas Havoc and Turbinlite de Havilland Mosquito, as well as radar equipped aircraft. The flight was disbanded on 3 June 1944 to become the Special Projectile Flight of the Royal Aircraft Establishment.
