= No. 17 Squadron RAAF =

17 Squadron
- Branch: RAAF
- Part of: 396ECSW
- Garrison/HQ: RAAF Base Tindal

No. 17 Squadron (17SQN), formerly 322 Expeditionary Combat Support Squadron (322ECSS) is a Royal Australian Air Force (RAAF) ground support squadron based at RAAF Base Tindal near Katherine, Northern Territory. In addition to providing support services at RAAF Tindal, it also has responsibilities for the three RAAF bare bases: RAAF Scherger near Weipa, Queensland, RAAF Curtin near Derby, Western Australia and RAAF Learmonth near Exmouth, Western Australia; and the Delamere Air Weapons Range.
