= No. 2 Security Forces Squadron RAAF =

No. 2 Security Forces Squadron
- Active: 10 April 1945 – 29 October 1945; 1951 – 12 September 1952; 17 March 1983 – present
- Country: Australia
- Branch: Royal Australian Air Force
- Type: Air Force security ground forces
- Role: Force protection and protective security
- Part of: Combat Support Group, No. 95 Wing
- Garrison/HQ: RAAF Base Amberley
- Motto: Defend the Eyrie
- Equipment: Hawkei
- Engagements: World War II: Borneo campaign; Battle of Tarakan; Battle of Labuan; Battle of Balikpapan (1945); 1999 East Timorese crisis: Operation Warden; Operation Spitfire; Iraq War; 2006 East Timor crisis: Operation Astute; War in Afghanistan (2001–2021): Operation Slipper; 2021 Kabul airlift

No. 2 Security Forces Squadron (2 SECFOR) is a Royal Australian Air Force military ground defence unit whose primary objective is to protect and defend Australian airfields, buildings, air force assets and installations, both domestic and overseas, alongside all personnel residing on bases, by deterring, detecting and countering attacks from enemy forces.

Headquartered at RAAF Base Amberley, the No. 2 Squadron provides security and air base defence in support of domestic air base operations across all permanent RAAF bases in Queensland and the Northern Territory. The Squadron also deploys to provide security and air base defence for expeditionary air base operations globally.

== Crest ==
The squadron's crest is a crossed rifle and sword surmounted by a wedge-tailed eagle in flight. The crossed rifle and sword is symbolic of the ground defence specialisation and represents both the offensive and defensive nature of ground defence within the Air Force and its inherent need to provide close-in and far-reaching security to counter hostile ground forces, with the motto: Defend the Eyrie.

== History ==
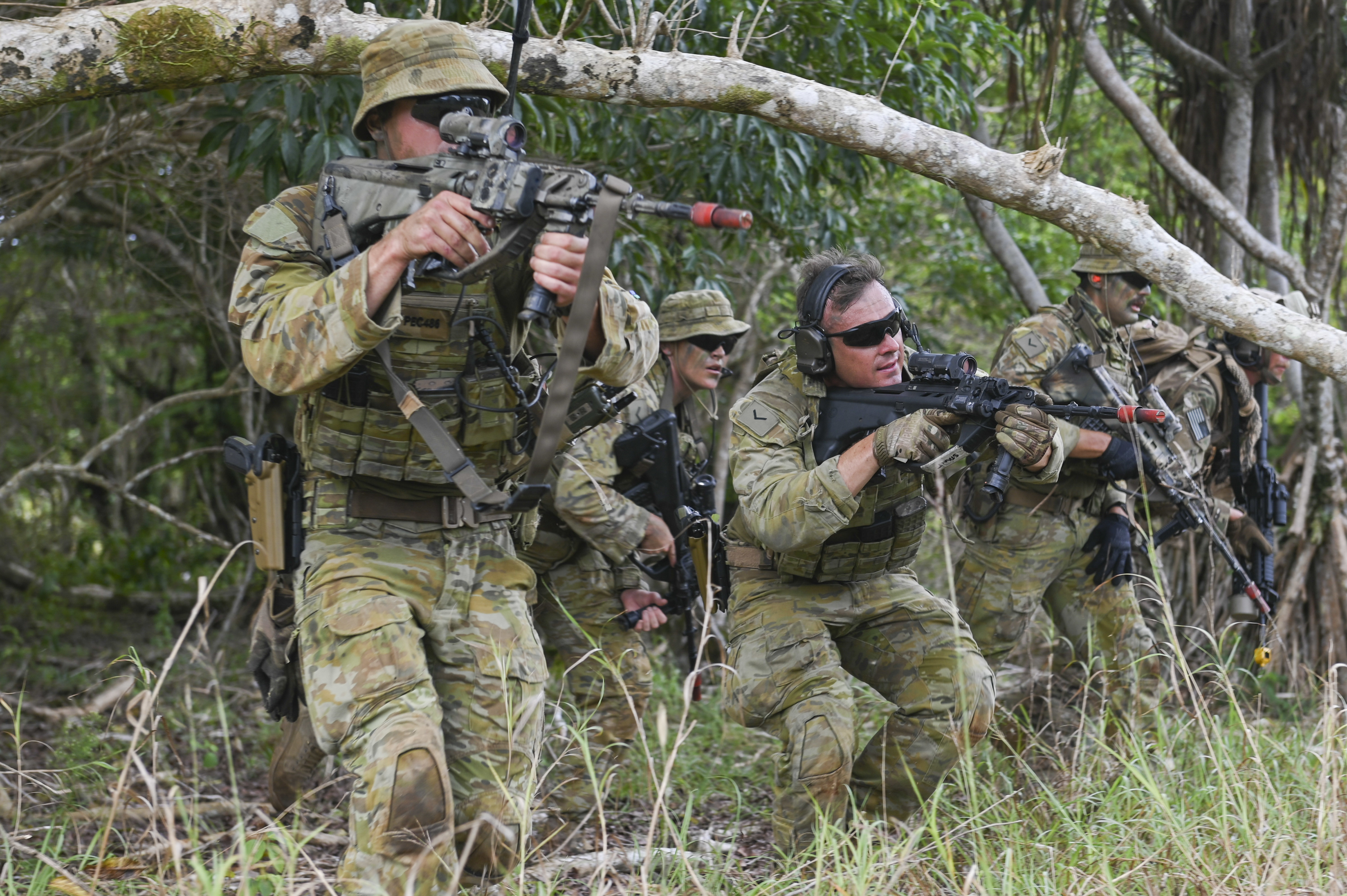
Members of No. 2 Security Forces Squadron during a training exercise in Guam during 2022

=== Origins and Second World War ===
The Squadron traces its origins to the establishment of a Defence Pool by the Royal Australian Air Force’s First Tactical Air Force at Noemfoor in the Dutch East Indies in late December 1944. This Defence Pool was organised by Squadron Leader Thomas T. McLaughlin, who was serving as the Staff Officer Defence for First Tactical Air Force. A Defence Pool was a temporary RAAF ground defence organisation formed to provide close protection of air force installations in forward operational areas until permanent airfield defence units could be established. Its purpose was to provide close protection for RAAF installations operating under the command of First Tactical Air Force. The formation of the Defence Pool followed an order issued on 29 October 1943 that placed responsibility for the protection of all installations under their control on Air Officers Commanding. Personnel for the Defence Pool were drawn from members within the First Tactical Air Force itself.

Prior to this change, RAAF guard personnel were carried on the posted strength of the Security Guards Unit, which was based at Livingstone Airfield near Darwin. That unit was responsible for training and supplying guards to protect operational bases and airfields across northern Australia and the South Pacific. After October 1943, the Security Guards Unit shifted its focus to deploying mobile air defence instructor teams, which were tasked with training guards and instructors at remote locations. In early 1945, a detachment from the Noemfoor Defence Pool moved to Morotai where it established a camp in advance of the arrival of the Defence Pool’s main body. On 28 March 1945, a decision was taken to disband the Defence Pool, and orders were issued directing all guards to return to their parent units. All barracks and equipment were transferred to No. 11 Communication Unit, with only the Defence Pool’s Commanding Officer and a small staff remaining in camp.

On 10 April 1945, No. 2 Airfield Defence Squadron was formed at Morotai, and postings of headquarters staff and guard personnel followed immediately. Commanded by Flight Lieutenant John C. Fullerton, the Squadron established a Headquarters Company and five Rifle Companies. Training commenced in preparation for deployment in support of Borneo Campaign designated as Operation Oboe, a planned series of amphibious assaults against Japanese forces in Borneo and surrounding islands. A (Rifle) Company received instruction in weapons, mines, and military tactics before departing Morotai in late April to take part in Operation Oboe One. At the same time, B (Rifle) Company organised and prepared for deployment on Operation Oboe Six, while D (Rifle) Company undertook preparations for Operation Oboe Two. C and D (Rifle) Companies were assigned to garrison duties at Morotai and to support No. 80 Wing respectively.

On 1 May 1945, A (Rifle) Flight participated in the initial landing on Tarakan Island off the coast of Borneo as part of Operation Oboe One. In the early hours of 5 May, Leading Aircraftman Thomas J. Irvine became the Squadron’s first fatal casualty when he was killed during a skirmish with an enemy infiltration party while manning a guard post on the outskirts of the bivouac area used by RAAF construction units. Other members of A (Rifle) Flight responded quickly, routing the enemy force and killing three of the enemy. During subsequent Operation Oboe landings at the Battle of Labuan and Battle of Balikpapan, the Squadron’s Rifle Flights, also referred to as Companies, were responsible for protecting critical Allied assets, including aircraft, bulk fuel installations, and major headquarters. The Squadron also worked alongside Australian Army units to provide wider airfield defence, including protection for isolated elements such as airfield construction detachments and radar sites. Following the cessation of hostilities in the Pacific in August 1945, No. 2 Airfield Defence Squadron was disbanded on 29 October 1945.

=== Post-war and reformation 1950's-1970s ===
The Squadron was re-raised in late 1951 at Western Junction, Tasmania with the task of training National Service personnel for the Korean War. It did not become operational and was disbanded on 12 September 1952. No. 1 Airfield Defence Squadron, which had been re-formed in July 1951, was also disbanded in July 1953. After the disbandment of both units, independent airfield defence squadrons ceased to exist for approximately three decades, although the RAAF continued to retain aerodrome defence officers and instructors. The airfield defence guard mustering was revived in 1965, but without the formation of dedicated squadrons. During this period, airfield defence guards served in combat on operations during the Indonesia–Malaysia confrontation, Thai-Malay border, and the Vietnam War.

=== Modern re-establishment ===
No. 2 Airfield Defence Squadron was re-formed on 17 March 1983 at RAAF Base Richmond under the command of Squadron Leader James B. H. Brown. Existing airfield defence guard flights (companies) located at RAAF Base Williamtown, Amberley, and Fairbairn were absorbed into the Squadron and designated as Nos. 2, 3, and 4 Rifle Flights respectively. The Squadron operated in a highly dispersed manner, with elements based at Richmond, Williamtown, and Amberley. Despite this dispersion, the unit soon established a regular program of training and exercises, including participation in joint activities with the Australian Army.

Between March 1987 and April 1988, personnel of No. 2 Airfield Defence Squadron below the rank of sergeant were temporarily reassigned from their operational duties to perform gate guard functions at RAAF Bases Richmond, Williamtown, and Amberley. This period had a significant negative impact on Squadron morale. Differences in organisational culture and working practices also strained relationships between Squadron members and base security management and staff. In April 1988, airfield defence guard flights returned to their normal duties, an outcome that was widely welcomed. However, after more than a year without operational training or exercises, skills had declined and required rapid remediation to meet upcoming exercise commitments.

From December 1988 to January 1989, the dispersed elements of the Squadron relocated to RAAF Base Amberley, bringing the unit together in one location for the first time. This consolidation led to noticeable improvements in morale and discipline. The period that followed involved intensive operational training and exercises, including a deployment to RAAF Base Butterworth for an exercise with Malaysian forces. The increased training tempo resulted in a higher injury rate, and personnel with long-term medical conditions were subjected to employment standards reviews, leading to some discharges and re-musterings. Despite these challenges, the emphasis on developing operational skills proved effective, and in 1991 No. 2 Airfield Defence Squadron was awarded the Gloucester Cup as the most proficient operational squadron, becoming the first non-flying unit to receive the award.

In July 1992, an Airfield Defence Wing and No. 1 Airfield Defence Squadron were established to train Ready Reserve airfield defence guards and ground defence officers. While Nos. 1 and 3 Airfield Defence Squadrons operated as Ready Reserve units, No. 2 Airfield Defence Squadron remained a Permanent Air Force unit. In May 1992, it re-equipped with the F88 Austeyr assault rifle. On 22 April 1995, the Squadron exercised the Freedom of the City of Brisbane, marching through the city following the granting of that honour by the Lord Mayor of Brisbane.

=== East Timor, Middle East and peacekeeping operations 1999-2012 ===
In 1999, to address the humanitarian and security crisis that took place in East Timor, the Squadron deployed to the country on 22nd September 1999, and were tasked with permanently securing and defending Komoro Airfield in Dili. In support of Operation Spitfire which involved the protected evacuation of personnel from the United Nations compound as part of the Australian-led International Force East Timor. No. 2 Airfield Defence Squadron remained in East Timor as part of Combat Support Group’s contribution to Operations Warden and Stabilise for which it was awarded the Meritorious Unit Citation in recognition of sustained outstanding service in March 2000. The citation reading, "For sustained outstanding service in warlike operations in support of the International Force for East Timor on Operations Warden and Operation Stabilise."

Following the commencement of the Iraq War, the Squadron, along with several other combat support units, provided personnel to the three deploying Expeditionary Combat Support Squadrons.

During 2005 and 2006, the Squadron contributed detachments to a number of assistance operations, including Operation Sumatra Assist in 2005, following the 2004 Indian Ocean earthquake and tsunami. In mid-April 2006, a rifle flight from the Squadron deployed as part of the Australian Defence Force contingent sent to the Solomon Islands, where it provided security at Henderson Field in Honiara following widespread civil unrest.

Later in early 2006, a rifle section from No. 2 Airfield Defence Squadron was deployed to Islamabad, Pakistan, responsible for providing security and protection for the No. 86 Wing aircraft and all Australian personnel. The aircraft airlifted a 140 member medical and support team on the field, sent to provide support and humanitarian relief, during Operation Pakistan Assist, following the October 2005 Kashmir earthquake, that killed over 80,000 people. The support team treated over 9,500 patients and administered more than 4,000 inoculations.

The Squadron also deployed a detachment in support of Operation Astute in May 2006 to quell unrest and return stability during the 2006 East Timor crisis at Dill Airport. The Squadron also provided protection at RAAF Base Richmond during the transit of Pope Benedict XVI for World Youth Day in July 2008.

In 2008, during the War in Afghanistan members of the Squadron deployed on Operation Slipper as part of Security Detachment 13, attached to the 7th Battalion, Royal Australian Regiment, between 8 March and 21 September. A second rotation of personnel deployed as part of Security Detachment 14, attached to the 2nd Cavalry Regiment from 15 September to December 2008. During these deployments, personnel were also responsible for securing the Australian Embassy and its staff within the Green Zone in Baghdad, Iraq. The Airfield Defence Wing was disbanded in 2007, and the three Airfield Defence Squadrons were reduced to two under the command of No. 395 Expeditionary Combat Support Wing.

As the higher-readiness unit, No. 2 Airfield Defence Squadron was staffed by Permanent Air Force personnel. Throughout 2007 and 2008, the Squadron was equipped with Bushmaster Protected Mobility Vehicle to improve its quick reaction force and air base mobility capabilities.

On 19 May 2011, the Squadron received its Standard from the Governor-General, the Honourable (later Dame) Quentin Bryce, during a consecration parade held at RAAF Base Amberley.

From November 2012, the Squadron contributed personnel to a seventy-member Security Force that protected approximately 7,500 personnel, infrastructure, and assets at Multi National Base Tarin Kot in Afghanistan over an eleven-month period.

=== Transition to Security Forces Squadron, 2013 ===
In 2011, an internal Air Force review of the force protection workforce resulted in a major organisational restructure. From 1 July 2013, ground defense, Air Force security, Air Force police, air base protection, and explosive ordnance disposal functions were combined into a single Security Forces capability. Three Security Forces Squadrons were formed, absorbing reservist security personnel from the former ‘City Squadrons’. As part of this restructure, No. 2 Airfield Defence Squadron was redesignated No. 2 Security Forces Squadron, with responsibility for protecting RAAF personnel and assets during both domestic routine operations and expeditionary deployments across the full range of security threats. Subsequently, 2AFDS was renamed No. 2 Security Forces Squadron.

=== Recent Operations and Exercises, present ===
The Squadron regularly deploys personnel on operational tasks and exercises. Members of No. 2 Security Forces Squadron have served on Operations Accordion, Mazurka, Saville, and Operation Okra. In 2018, the Squadron deployed on Exercise Cope North, where personnel shared security expertise with United States and Japanese forces.

During biennial Exercise Pitch Black 2018, No. 2 Security Forces Squadron deployed to Batchelor Airfield in the remote Northern Territory as part of a contested airfield scenario designed to simulate seizure, clearance, and rapid reactivation of a forward operating base. Following the insertion of Army 2nd Commando Regiment and RAAF No. 4 Squadron Combat Control Team elements, the airfield was temporarily held in a simulated hostile environment before being cleared for friendly forces. No. 2 Security Forces Squadron then moved in to assume control of the site, rapidly establishing ground defence and restoring security across the airfield. Operating in a recently contested environment, the squadron immediately secured the perimeter, established access control points, and conducted continuous patrols to stabilize the airfield and prevent re-infiltration. Their actions formed the initial defensive layer of the reactivated base, providing immediate force protection during the transition from cleared landing zone to an operational airfield. Enabling the rapid build-up of expeditionary infrastructure and the subsequent handover to the No.382 Contingency Response Squadron which expanded the site into a fully functioning deployed airbase.

The exercise demonstrated rapid seizure, clearance, and reactivation of a forward airfield, highlighting No. 2 Security Forces Squadron’s role in establishing immediate ground security and enabling the transition to expeditionary air operations.

In 2020, Squadron members contributed to Operation COVID-19 Assist. During the COVID-19 pandemic, the unit adapted its working and training practices to comply with distancing and quarantine requirements while continuing to meet capability demands.

In 2020, the Military Working Dogs Section of No. 2 Security Forces Squadron was awarded the Lady Hannah and Bill Perrett Perpetual Shield. Established in 1972 and named in honour of Lady Patricia Hannah, the wife of former Chief of the Air Staff Sir Colin Hannah, the award recognises the highest-performing military working dog section within the Royal Australian Air Force.

During the 2021 Kabul airlift, members of the RAAF Security Forces, including many Airfield Defense Guards helped successfully evacuate 4100 people including Australian nationals, British citizens and approved foreign nationals who helped support Western forces, from Hamid Karzai International Airport, they were evacuated on more than 30 RAAF flights from August 18 - 26. Security Forces ensured safe processing and screening of evacuees prior to boarding, maintaining aircraft and crew security, and assisting with crowd control and movement through the airfield in a highly congested and rapidly deteriorating security environment, such as managing aggressive, crowded conditions around the tarmac to safely load evacuees, and guarding around the flight line. The operation was conducted under significant time pressure, with large numbers of distressed civilians and complex security risks present throughout the evacuation, albeit successful.

In 2022, No. 2 Security Forces Squadron held Exercise Urban Nomad, a training exercise conducted for high-threat airbase defence operations at RAAF Base Amberley from 30 May to 15 July. The Squadron conducted night-time force protection exercises using Bushmaster PMVs, quad bikes, UAV drones, and explosive detection dogs to simulate responses to high-threats against Air Force airbases. Conducted across five phases at the Urban Operations Training Facility, the 46 day and night exercise tested rapid-response tactics, urban combat skills, reconnaissance, and force protection capabilities in complex environments designed to simulate threats to Air Force airbases. Squadron Leader Mark Rankin stated that the exercise prepared personnel to remain adaptable, coordinated, and capable of defending Air Force bases, assets, and personnel, effectively across a wide range of threats and environments, to which they could respond at any time when a threat is detected.

In May 2023, No. 2 Security Forces Squadron’s, 1 Rifle Flight (1RFLT) in preparation for Exercise Talisman Sabre, undertook intensive jungle warfare training during Exercise Regional War Fighter at the Tully Training Area alongside the 8th/9th Battalion, Royal Australian Regiment. Integrated into Combat Team Charlie, the unit trained in close-terrain combat and airfield defence operations under harsh wet-season conditions. Operating through dense jungle, extreme heat, and limited visibility, 1RFLT conducted fighting patrols, night ambushes, camp-clearance operations, and quick reaction force missions against simulated enemy forces. Personnel assigned as Scouts were employed to lead patrol movements, identify likely enemy positions, detect obstacles, and conduct route reconnaissance and pathfinding through difficult terrain. The exercise marked one of the squadron’s first deployments within platoon and company-sized combat maneuver elements alongside Army infantry units. The training strengthened interoperability between Air Force security forces and Army combat units while enhancing the squadron’s capability to conduct high-threat operations in northern Australia and the near region, including at RAAF Base Scherger.

In July 2023, Exercise Nomad Walk was conducted by No. 2 Security Forces Squadron at RAAF Base Amberley, focusing on integrating intelligence, surveillance and reconnaissance (ISR) systems into base defence operations. A Base Defence Coordination Cell was established to build a real-time operational picture, combining inputs from multiple ISR platforms including unmanned aerial systems, surveillance cameras, and tactical reconnaissance tools. These systems provided early warning, improved situational awareness, and allowed commanders to identify and track simulated threats across the base. Using live feeds such as thermal imagery from drones, commanders directed quick reaction forces to intercept and respond to intrusions.

The exercise also rehearsed counter-penetration, counter-attack, and destroy or neutralize targets. Conducted alongside mounted patrols in Bushmaster protected mobility vehicles and reconnaissance G-Wagons, ISR systems provided real-time monitoring of the training area, allowing commanders to turn live data into actionable intelligence and identify potential threat patterns. Using thermal imagery from unmanned aerial systems, battle captains were able to track simulated adversaries and direct response teams to their adversaries in the training area. Demonstrating the squadron’s growing capability in integrating technology-driven surveillance with tactical response operations in support of airbase security.

During Exercise Talisman Sabre 2023 between July and August 2023, No. 2 Security Forces Squadron deployed to RAAF Base Curtin, in Western Australia, where it was tasked with defending a forward operating airbase supporting coalition air operations. The squadron secured an area of nearly 20 square kilometres, maintaining surveillance and force protection across extensive perimeter boundaries, airfield infrastructure, aircraft operating areas, and key command facilities. As the primary airbase ground defence force, squadron personnel conducted continuous patrols, observation operations, access control, and rapid response tasks while operating in a dynamic threat environment. Exercise scenarios included enemy reconnaissance activity, indirect fire attacks, attempted infiltrations, and coordinated ground assaults against the airfield.

Security Forces personnel were required to detect, identify, track, and respond to hostile forces seeking to disrupt flying operations. A significant component of the squadron's activities involved the employment of Intelligence, Surveillance and Reconnaissance (ISR) assets. Personnel established and operated a network of agile surveillance cameras covering likely infiltration routes, perimeter sectors, and critical infrastructure, creating a layered surveillance system across the airfield. The squadron also employed R-70 unmanned aerial systems to monitor areas beyond the perimeter, identify potential enemy firing positions, and provide real-time intelligence to commanders and security patrols.

During simulated indirect-fire attacks, squadron personnel implemented airfield defence procedures, occupying prepared defensive positions while ISR operators searched for enemy mortar teams and assessed likely firing locations. Following attacks, security teams re-established patrol patterns, reinforced vulnerable sectors, and prepared to counter follow-on ground assaults. The exercise required close coordination between patrol elements, surveillance operators, and command personnel to maintain airfield security under evolving threat conditions. The squadron also coordinated with reconnaissance elements of the 10th Light Horse Regiment, which established observation posts beyond the airfield perimeter and conducted long-duration surveillance of surrounding terrain. Intelligence collected by these forward elements was integrated into the squadron's defensive planning, enhancing early warning capabilities and extending situational awareness beyond the immediate airbase area.

Through the integration of unmanned systems, persistent surveillance networks, intelligence-led operations, and mobile response forces, the squadron demonstrated its ability to defend deployed airbases against complex and multi-domain threats while enabling sustained air operations in a contested environment.

In December 2023, personnel from No. 2 Security Forces Squadron conducted the Aircraft Security Operations course at RAAF Base Amberley, culminating in a high-pressure final assessment simulating a non-combatant evacuation scenario. Security personnel and Airfield Defence Guards were challenged with fast-moving crowds, injured evacuees, armed role players, and simulated small-arms fire designed to replicate a deteriorating and unpredictable evacuation environment. Operating under intense time pressure, teams secured aircraft, controlled access points, and protected evacuees as they were processed for airlift. The training tested in-flight and fly-away security skills, whilst airborne and on the ground, coordination with air mobility and aeromedical evacuation units, and the ability to maintain order and safety in a rapidly evolving operational setting. The exercise also featured integration with Japan Air Self-Defense Force personnel, enhancing interoperability and demonstrating shared capability in conducting complex evacuation and aircraft security operations.

During Exercise Talisman Sabre 2025, No. 2 Security Forces Squadron played a leading role in the first-ever coordinated, multi-base airfield defence network across RAAF Base Darwin, RAAF Base Tindal and RAAF Base Curtin. The exercise linked all three northern airbases into a single integrated security system, rather than treating each base as an independent defensive site. Operating alongside Army elements including the 2nd Division, 13th Brigade and elements of the 2nd Commando Regiment, as well as United States Air Force Security Forces and No. 1 Security Forces Squadron. No. 2 Security Forces Squadron contributed to shared threat reporting, joint planning, and synchronised base defence responses across the network. This created a common operational picture spanning all three airbases and enabled coordinated responses to simulated threats. The squadron conducted patrols, access control, and rapid response operations while contributing to cross-base coordination of security forces and defensive activity.

Security responses deployed during the exercise included protected mobility vehicles, Security Force patrol vehicles, and military working dog teams, used to deter, detect, and deny unauthorised access to the airbases. These measures supported the continued operation and projection of air power from northern Australia.

In August 2025. The final Hawkei Protected Mobility Vehicle – Light (PMV-L) for the Royal Australian Air Force was officially handed over at RAAF Base Amberley. The delivery completed the distribution of 59 Hawkei vehicles to Security Forces Squadrons. No. 2 Security Forces Squadron received the vehicles as part of the RAAF’s enhanced ground security and mobility capability. The Hawkei provides Air Force Security units with improved protected mobility, support airbase security and rapid response operations with flexible response options across airbases, and enhanced networked communications capabilities. The Hawkei is protected against ballistic threats, blasts, and improvised explosive devices (IEDs), while remaining lighter and more mobile than larger protected vehicles such as the Bushmaster.

== Engagements ==
- World War II
- Thailand
- Vietnam War
- Kuwait
- East Timor
- Solomon Islands
- War in Afghanistan
- Iraq War
- 2021 Kabul Airlift

== Structure ==
- Headquarters Flight
- Support Flight
- 2 Permanent Rifle Flights Based in RAAF Amberley each comprising a Flight HQ of FLTOFF, SGT and two CPL/LAC and 3 Rifle Sections of ten personnel
- 2 Reserve Rifle Flights Based in RAAF Amberley each comprising a Flight HQ of FLTOFF, SGT and two CPL/LAC and 3 Rifle Sections of ten personnel
- Quick Reaction Flight, Motorised Rifle Flight equip with Bushmaster PMV's PAF Cadre Only
- Airbase Protection Flight Reserve Personal Only, Based in RAAF Amberley
- Detachment RAAF Base Darwin 1x MWD Section, 1x AFSEC Section 1x ADG Defence Section of 1 FSGT, 1 SGT & 1 CPL and Nth’ern Regional Cdr (SQNLDR) For RAAF Darwin & RAAF Tindal with the Deputy Regional Cdr a FLTLT Ground Defence Officer
- Detachment RAAF Base Tindal 1x ADG Rifle Section 1x MWD Section,
- Detachment RAAF Base Townsville 1x ADG Rifle Section 1x MWD Section
