= Delamere Air Weapons Range =

Bombing range in the Northern Territory, Australia

- Near Katherine, Northern Territory in Australia
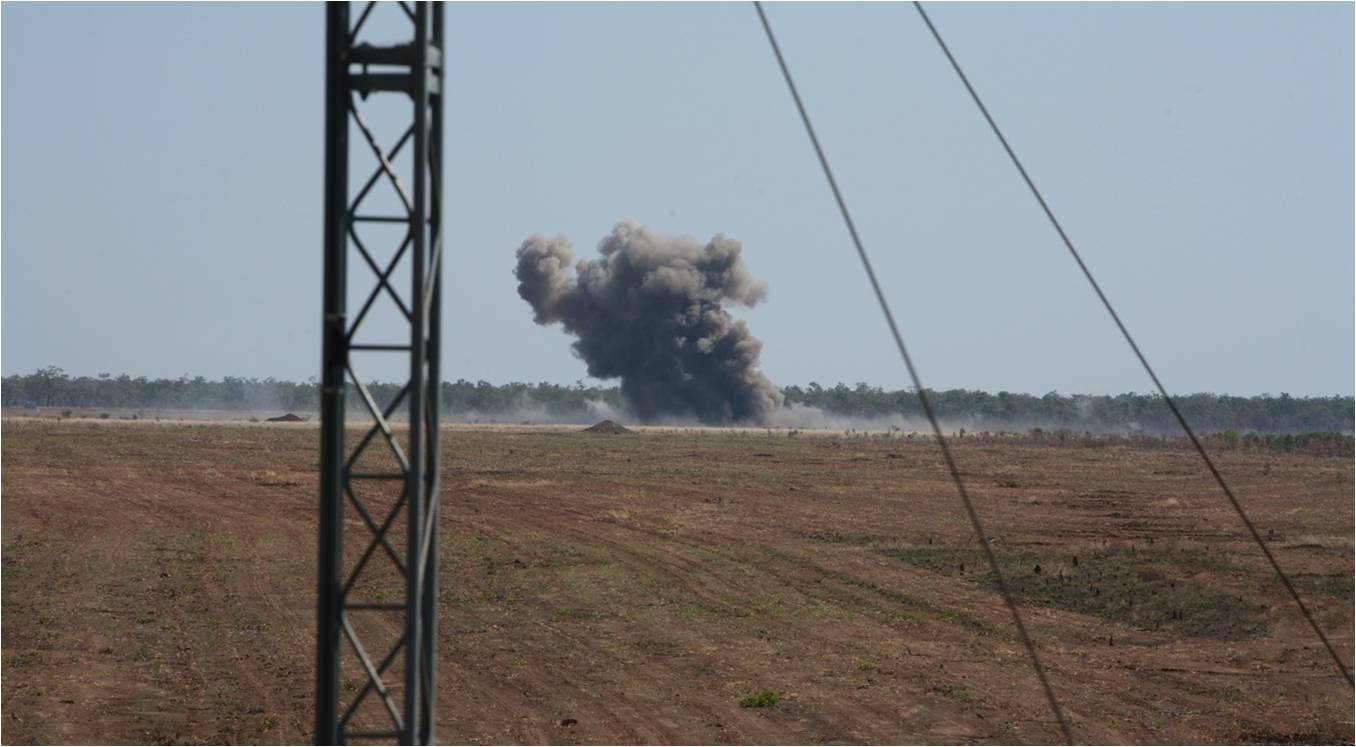
- A bomb dropped by U.S. Marine squadron VMFA-232 explodes at Delamere Air Weapons Range during Exercise Southern Frontier 2012

Site information
- Type: Bombing range
- Owner: Department of Defence
- Operator: Royal Australian Air Force
- Controlled by: No. 322 Expeditionary Combat Support Squadron RAAF

Location
- Location of Delamere AWR in the Northern Territory
- Coordinates: 15°37′S 131°52′E
- Area: 2,110 square kilometres (810 sq mi)

Site history
- Built: 1988

Delamere Air Weapons Range is a bombing range operated by the Royal Australian Air Force (RAAF), located in the Northern Territory of Australia. The facility is located about 200 kilometres (120 mi) south of the town of Katherine and RAAF Base Tindal, Australia's largest airbase.

The Delamere facility is managed round-the-clock by a detachment of eight members of the No. 322 Expeditionary Combat Support Squadron RAAF. Its large area—2,110 square kilometres (810 sq mi)—and 60,000 feet (18,000 m) of vertical airspace clearance allow virtually unrestricted freedom of tactical testing and training using any conventional weapons. In addition to its large mass inert weapon range, Delamere also has two practice ranges for smaller weapons testing, a simulated airfield complex, and a simulated township constructed from shipping containers named "Tac Town".

Delamere is 100 kilometres (62 mi) east of the larger Bradshaw Field Training Area which has an area of 8,700 square kilometres (3,400 sq mi), and the Department of Defence has considered acquiring land between the two facilities to merge them. Both areas are used for joint military exercises such as the Australia–United States Exercise Talisman Saber. Delamere is electronically linked with Bradshaw Field and Mount Bundey Training Area to form the North Australian Range Complex.

The range is served by its own airfield, Delamere Range Facility Airport (ICAO: YDWF).

== Geography ==
=== Climate ===
There is a weather station near the facility. It suggests that the area has a tropical savanna climate bordering on a Tropical semi-arid climate (Köppen: Aw/BSh) with a short wet season from November to March and a long dry season from April to October. Extreme temperatures ranged from 43.6 °C (110.5 °F) on 6 December 2019 5.0 °C (41.0 °F) on 29 June 1999. The wettest recorded day was 11 March 2024 with 175.6 mm (6.91 in) of rainfall.

Climate data for Delamere Weapons Range (15.74°S 131.92°E) (221 m (725 ft) AMSL) (1997-2025)
| Month | Jan | Feb | Mar | Apr | May | Jun | Jul | Aug | Sep | Oct | Nov | Dec | Year |
|---|---|---|---|---|---|---|---|---|---|---|---|---|---|
| Record high °C (°F) | 42.3 (108.1) | 41.0 (105.8) | 41.0 (105.8) | 39.2 (102.6) | 37.6 (99.7) | 35.7 (96.3) | 36.0 (96.8) | 37.9 (100.2) | 40.3 (104.5) | 43.0 (109.4) | 43.0 (109.4) | 43.6 (110.5) | 43.6 (110.5) |
| Mean daily maximum °C (°F) | 34.7 (94.5) | 34.5 (94.1) | 34.8 (94.6) | 34.4 (93.9) | 31.6 (88.9) | 29.4 (84.9) | 29.7 (85.5) | 32.0 (89.6) | 35.8 (96.4) | 37.8 (100.0) | 37.7 (99.9) | 36.2 (97.2) | 34.1 (93.3) |
| Mean daily minimum °C (°F) | 24.2 (75.6) | 24.0 (75.2) | 23.4 (74.1) | 21.3 (70.3) | 17.9 (64.2) | 15.5 (59.9) | 14.9 (58.8) | 16.2 (61.2) | 20.7 (69.3) | 24.0 (75.2) | 24.8 (76.6) | 24.7 (76.5) | 21.0 (69.7) |
| Record low °C (°F) | 18.0 (64.4) | 19.0 (66.2) | 17.0 (62.6) | 13.0 (55.4) | 9.0 (48.2) | 5.0 (41.0) | 5.5 (41.9) | 7.9 (46.2) | 11.0 (51.8) | 15.0 (59.0) | 17.2 (63.0) | 19.0 (66.2) | 5.0 (41.0) |
| Average precipitation mm (inches) | 213.5 (8.41) | 223.2 (8.79) | 152.2 (5.99) | 19.0 (0.75) | 5.4 (0.21) | 2.0 (0.08) | 1.7 (0.07) | 0.2 (0.01) | 4.0 (0.16) | 28.6 (1.13) | 85.9 (3.38) | 171.6 (6.76) | 885.3 (34.85) |
| Average precipitation days (≥ 0.2 mm) | 16.1 | 14.3 | 11.9 | 2.7 | 0.9 | 0.4 | 0.5 | 0.0 | 1.1 | 3.9 | 9.0 | 13.8 | 74.6 |
| Average afternoon relative humidity (%) | 54 | 53 | 48 | 32 | 28 | 27 | 24 | 19 | 20 | 24 | 31 | 45 | 34 |
| Average dew point °C (°F) | 21.4 (70.5) | 20.9 (69.6) | 19.3 (66.7) | 13.5 (56.3) | 9.3 (48.7) | 6.2 (43.2) | 5.0 (41.0) | 3.7 (38.7) | 7.1 (44.8) | 10.2 (50.4) | 14.9 (58.8) | 18.9 (66.0) | 12.5 (54.6) |
Source: Bureau of Meteorology (1997-2025)

== See also ==
- List of Royal Australian Air Force installations
- List of airports in the Northern Territory
