= RAAF bare bases =

Australian defence facilities

The Royal Australian Air Force currently maintains three bare bases in remote areas of Northern Australia. These bases were developed in the 1980s and 1990s in line with the Defence of Australia Policy to enhance the RAAF's ability to conduct combat operations from the Australian mainland. As front line bases, the bare bases are well-provisioned with bunkers and other defensive facilities and have the capability to support the RAAF's combat aircraft during wartime.

During peacetime the bare bases are maintained by a small caretaker staff drawn from No. 322 Expeditionary Combat Support Squadron. Flying and support units are not permanently stationed at bare bases. The bases are occasionally activated during exercises with flying and support units deploying from other RAAF bases to staff the base for the duration of the exercise.

In December 2008 RAAF Learmonth was rapidly activated to support border protection patrols conducted by Lockheed AP-3C Orions. During this period more than 200 personnel were stationed at the base.

The RAAF maintains caches of catering equipment, bedding and defence stores at each of the bare bases so that they can be rapidly activated. The size of these caches was reduced by 25 percent in 2012, and the RAAF's newspaper Air Force stated that the service was considering storing all the supplies at a central location in the future. In October 2013 it was reported that the caches were in the process of being centralised. Once the process is complete supplies will be flown or driven to the bases when they are activated.

The three bare bases are:

- RAAF Base Scherger near Weipa, Queensland
- RAAF Base Curtin near Derby, Western Australia
- RAAF Base Learmonth near Exmouth, Western Australia

RAAF Tindal near Katherine, Northern Territory, was maintained as a bare base for a number of years before being upgraded in 1988 to a permanent operational base for No. 75 Squadron's F/A-18s.
