= Charles Learmonth =

Royal Australian Air Force officer

Charles Cuthbertson Learmonth
- Born: 2 May 1917; Portland, Victoria
- Died: 6 January 1944 (aged 26) near Rottnest Island
- Military career
- Allegiance: Australia
- Branch: Royal Australian Air Force
- Service years: 1938–1944
- Rank: Wing Commander
- Commands: No. 14 Squadron RAAF; No. 22 Squadron RAAF
- Conflicts: Second World War
- Awards: Distinguished Flying Cross & Bar

Charles Cuthbertson Learmonth DFC & Bar (2 May 1917 – 6 January 1944) was an officer in the Royal Australian Air Force (RAAF) during World War II. He commanded No. 22 Squadron in combat during the New Guinea campaign, and subsequently took over No. 14 Squadron which was stationed near Perth, Western Australia. He was killed in a flying accident on 6 January 1944, and one of the RAAF's bases was later named in his honour.

== Death ==
On 6 January 1944, Learmonth led a formation of three No. 14 Squadron Bristol Beauforts on an exercise off Rottnest Island with ships of the US Navy. At a height of 1,000 ft (300 m) and about 18 mi (29 km) north-west of Rottnest Island his Beaufort began to shake violently. The Australian-built Beauforts were plagued by a mysterious problem that had destroyed over 90 aircraft and killed many crews, including many under training at RAAF East Sale. Learmonth recognised that the violent shaking was driven by the tail of his aircraft and he called Flight Lieutenant Ken Hewitt, the pilot of one of the other Beauforts, to fly in close and observe his tail. Hewitt could see the control rod to the elevator trim tab on Learmonth's Beaufort, hanging down. It had separated from the tab, allowing the tab and elevator to oscillate and drive the violent shaking of the whole aircraft. Learmonth used his radio to advise the crews of the other two Beauforts what he was observing. Shortly afterwards, the trim tab flicked to the extreme up position, over-powering Learmonth and forcing the aircraft to descend rapidly. After less than a minute Learmonth's Beaufort crashed into the sea, killing Learmonth and his three crew members. The wireless operator on one of the other Beauforts reported sighting a parachute on the surface of the water.

With the information obtained from Learmonth's radio commentary the problem plaguing the Australian-built Beauforts was traced to a component in the elevator trim tab actuating unit. All the RAAF Beauforts were grounded until they were modified to eliminate the problem. Learmonth is credited with supplying the vital information that was necessary to identify the problem and eventually solve it. A secret World War II landing field at Exmouth Gulf, Western Australia, known only by the code-name Potshot, was eventually developed into a permanent military base and named RAAF Learmonth in honour of Wing Commander Charles Learmonth.
