= No. 14 Squadron RAAF =

Royal Australian Air Force squadron

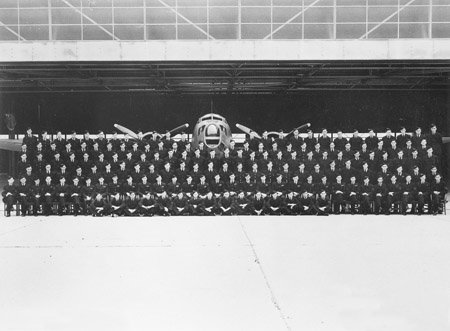
- Members of No. 14 Squadron RAAF in front of a Lockheed Hudson
- Active: 1939–1945
- Country: Australia
- Branch: Royal Australian Air Force
- Role: Maritime patrol
- Garrison/HQ: RAAF Base Pearce
- Motto(s): "Resilient and ready"
- Engagements: World War II: Axis naval activity in Australian waters

Commanders
- Notable commanders: Charles Learmonth (1943–1944)

Insignia
- Squadron codes: PN, P

Aircraft flown
- Patrol: Avro Anson (1939–1940); Lockheed Hudson (1940–1942); Bristol Beaufort (1942–1945)

No. 14 Squadron was a Royal Australian Air Force maritime patrol squadron of World War II. It was formed in 1939 and was based in Western Australia throughout the war. While it conducted many patrols over the waters off Western Australia, it did not see combat. The squadron was disbanded in December 1945.

== Squadron history ==
=== Early years ===
No. 14 Squadron was formed at RAAF Base Pearce near Perth, Western Australia on 6 February 1939. It was initially equipped with six Avro Anson aircraft, and conducted training exercises until the outbreak of World War II.

The squadron conducted its first wartime maritime patrol on 7 September 1939. During late 1939 it also patrolled the remote coastline between Derby and Wyndham in the north of Western Australia as it was thought that German vessels might shelter there. In mid-January 1940 a detachment was deployed to Albany in the south of the state to protect a convoy carrying elements of the Second Australian Imperial Force in cooperation with No. 25 Squadron. The squadron flew in support of many subsequent troop convoys throughout the war, and deployed aircraft to Albany on other occasions. No. 14 Squadron's Ansons were replaced with Lockheed Hudsons in May 1940. The new aircraft had superior performance, and were better suited to maritime patrol tasks. The squadron continued its regular program of patrols throughout the year, though a detachment was deployed to Darwin in the Northern Territory for a period in December.

From February 1941, No. 14 Squadron began to conduct anti-submarine patrols off Western Australia in addition to general reconnaissance patrols. It conducted these routine operations throughout the year, and occasionally exercised with Australian Army units. In November the squadron was heavily involved in the unsuccessful search for the light cruiser HMAS Sydney after she was sunk in a battle with the German auxiliary cruiser Kormoran. No. 14 Squadron flew more than 60 sorties during this operation, most of which were conducted from remote airstrips.

=== Pacific War ===
After the Pacific War began in December 1941, No. 14 Squadron stepped up its program of patrols. No Japanese submarines or warships were sighted, though on 2 March 1942 one of the squadron's Hudsons bombed and damaged the United States Navy submarine USS Sargo after she did not answer recognition signals. The Hudson's pilot was cleared of blame in the subsequent inquires. On 3 March, a No. 14 Squadron Hudson was destroyed by Japanese aircraft during the attack on Broome; its crew were not among the many casualties from this raid, however. The squadron continued to make routine patrols throughout the remainder of 1942. In December that year it was re-equipped with Bristol Beaufort aircraft.

No. 14 Squadron's duties did not change for the remainder of the war. Throughout 1943 it flew two daily patrols of the waters between Perth and Albany, as well as patrols along the coastline up to Exmouth Gulf. Two Beauforts crashed during these patrols, resulting in the death of six men. The squadron's operations were intensified in March 1943 in response to concerns that Japanese ships would conduct a raid into the Indian Ocean. In May, No. 14 Squadron conducted patrols of the waters around Exmouth Gulf while the British Eastern Fleet refueled there ahead of the Operation Transom raid against Surabaya in Java; United States Navy Consolidated PBY Catalinas and Supermarine Spitfires from No. 1 Wing RAAF also protected the fleet at this time.

On 6 January 1944 a Beaufort piloted by No. 14 Squadron's commanding officer, Wing Commander Charles Learmonth, crashed during an exercise with United States Navy warships off Rottnest Island; Learmonth and the other three airmen on board the aircraft were killed. The RAAF base at Exmouth Gulf was later named RAAF Learmonth in the wing commander's honour. The squadron's patrols were again greatly intensified in March 1944, when it was feared that a Japanese force might raid Western Australia. In the event, the Japanese raiders sank a single ship in the central Indian Ocean before returning to base. By this stage of the war, the Allies were rapidly advancing into Japanese-held territory, and the threat of attacks on shipping in Australian waters had greatly decreased. In July 1944 the United States Navy unit Patrol Wing 10, which had been based at Perth since 1942, was transferred elsewhere. This greatly increased the burden on No. 14 Squadron. The squadron was placed on alert between September and October in response to reports that German submarines might operate off Fremantle, and expanded its program of patrols. Activity was intensified from December when the German submarine U-862 attacked merchant ships off South Australia and New South Wales. On 6 February 1945 this submarine sank the liberty ship Peter Silvester in the Indian Ocean while returning to its base in the Japanese-occupied Netherlands East Indies. Consolidated B-24 Liberators from No. 25 Squadron and Catalinas from the British No. 205 Squadron RAF responded to this attack.

The need for maritime patrols decreased during 1945. No. 25 Squadron operated solely as a heavy bomber unit from February, leaving No. 14 Squadron the only RAAF maritime patrol unit in Western Australia. Despite crew shortages, it was able to meet its commitments. The squadron ceased making regular anti-submarine patrols on 23 May 1945, though it retained responsibility for shipping protection off Western Australia in the event of any renewed enemy attacks. Following the war, No. 14 Squadron was disbanded at Pearce on 10 December 1945. During its existence, 35 members of the squadron were killed.
