= RAAF Base Tindal =

Royal Australian Air Force base

RAAF Base Tindal Tindal Air Base
- Katherine Tindal Civilian Airport
- near Katherine, Northern Territory in Australia
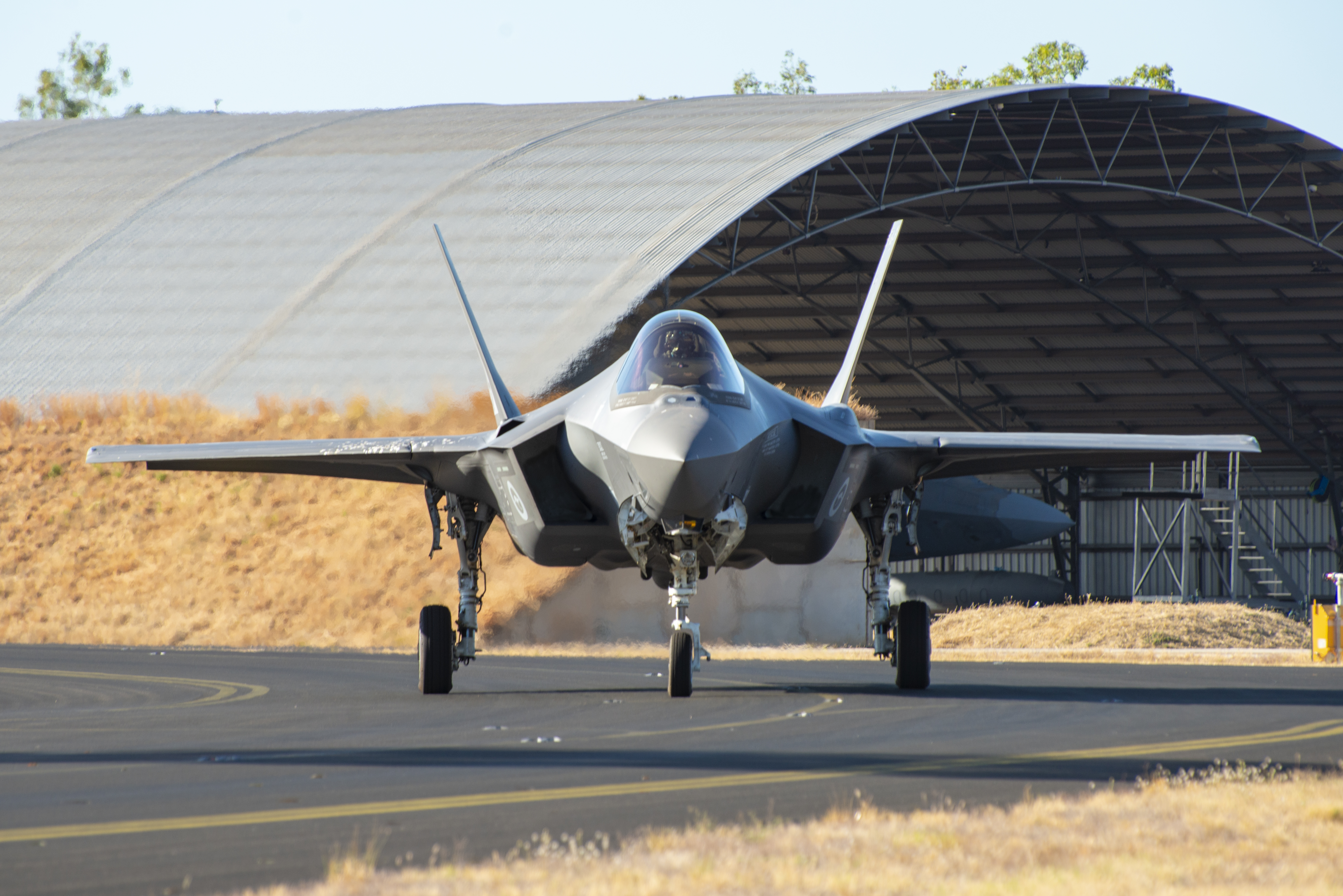
- A No. 75 Squadron RAAF F-35A Lightning II at RAAF Base Tindal in 2023

- The crest of RAAF Tindal

Site information
- Type: Military air base; Civil aviation airfield
- Owner: Department of Defence
- Operator: Royal Australian Air Force

Location
- Location in the Northern Territory
- Coordinates: 14°31′16″S 132°22′40″E

Site history
- Built: 1942
- In use: 1942 – present

Garrison information
- Occupants: No. 75 Squadron; No. 452 Squadron Tindal Flight; No. 3 Control and Reporting Unit Detachment Tindal; No. 322 Expeditionary Combat Support Squadron; No. 1 Airfield Operations Support Squadron Detachment Tindal; No. 2 Expeditionary Health Squadron Detachment Tindal; 2SECFOR Squadron

Airfield information
- Identifiers: IATA: KTR, ICAO: YPTN
- Elevation: 135 metres (443 ft) AMSL
Runways
Direction	Length and surface
14/32	2,744 metres (9,003 ft) Asphalt
- Sources: Australian AIP and aerodrome chart

RAAF Base Tindal (IATA: KTR, ICAO: YPTN) also known as Tindal Air Base is a Royal Australian Air Force (RAAF) major Australian military air base and civil aviation airfield located 8 nautical miles (15 km; 9.2 mi) east southeast of the town of Katherine, Northern Territory in Australia. The base is currently home to No. 75 Squadron and a number of non-flying units, and also hosts the civilian Katherine Tindal Airport (also known as the Katherine Tindal Civilian Airport). First constructed in 1942, it was refurbished in the late 1960s as a bare base capable of being utilised when required. It was opened as a permanently manned RAAF base in 1989.

As of 2024, the base is under upgrades largely funded by the United States Air Force to allow Tindal Air Base to host larger aircraft, most notably a total of 6 Boeing B-52 Stratofortress nuclear-capable bombers of the United States.

The base is well known as hosting the most advanced American aircraft that enter Australia, and during the Middle Eastern crisis, Tindal provided services to the United States B-2 Spirit stealth bombers immediately prior to their attacks on the Houthis.

== History ==
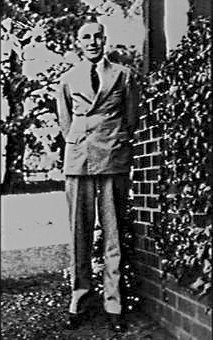
Archie Tindal, for whom the airfield was named in 1946

Tindal was initially built for the RAAF as Carson's Airfield in 1942. The airfield was constructed by the US Army's 43rd Engineer General Service Regiment. Its purpose was to provide a base for Consolidated B-24 Liberator heavy bombers that could strike at Japanese targets in Papua New Guinea and the Dutch East Indies, but the turning tide of the war rendered this unnecessary and no aircraft were deployed there before the cessation of hostilities. In 1946, the airfield was renamed in honour of Wing Commander Archibald (Archie) Tindal, the first RAAF member killed in action on the Australian mainland during World War II; he died while manning a machine gun against Japanese raiders bombing Darwin on 19 February 1942, and was buried at the Adelaide River war cemetery.

In 1959, the Chief of the Air Staff, Air Marshal Sir Frederick Scherger, proposed building a second airfield in the Darwin area. Like Tindal, he had been in Darwin when it was bombed by the Japanese in 1942, and believed that Australia's defences in the north needed to be strengthened. Following a survey, Tindal was selected in May 1963 as being close enough to RAAF Base Darwin to afford mutual protection, but far enough from the coast to be defensible and to avoid the effects of tropical cyclones. Other factors, such as being outside the projected nuclear fall-out zone should Darwin be targeted by a nuclear weapon, as well as an adequate water supply and suitable road and rail connections, also influenced the decision.

Conceived as an "Un-Manned Operational Base" (later to be known as a bare base), Tindal was to have no permanent staff and very few buildings. Essentially it would consist of a runway, taxiways and hardstanding along with the minimal infrastructure, such as electricity and water, to permit it to be activated when required. No. 5 Airfield Construction Squadron commenced work in 1964 and the 2,743-metre (8,999 ft) runway was completed in March 1967, at a cost of $7 million. The base was ready to support RAAF units by early 1968, though work expanding its facilities continued through 1968 and 1969.

In 1984, the Federal Government decided to move the RAAF's fast jet base in the Northern Territory from Darwin to Tindal to more effectively control the sea-air gap, in keeping with its strategic policy of defence in depth. After a major upgrade, RAAF Tindal became operational on 1 October 1988, the first new staffed base to be established since World War II. Construction by Thiess commenced in 1984.

It was officially opened on 31 March 1989, the RAAF's 68th anniversary, by Prime Minister Bob Hawke. The opening was originally planned for July 1988 but was delayed due to difficulties finding a date suitable to both Hawke and the Minister for Defence, Kim Beazley. Since its establishment, Tindal has remained the RAAF's main operational base in the Northern Territory. It has regularly hosted other units for exercises and supported the Australian-led intervention during the 1999 East Timorese crisis, and No. 75 Squadron's deployment for the 2003 invasion of Iraq. In keeping with Tindal's position in the northern area of operations, it is staffed exclusively by uniformed personnel. In 2004, it was awarded the RAAF's Hawker Siddeley Trophy for most proficient base of the previous year.

== Upgrades ==
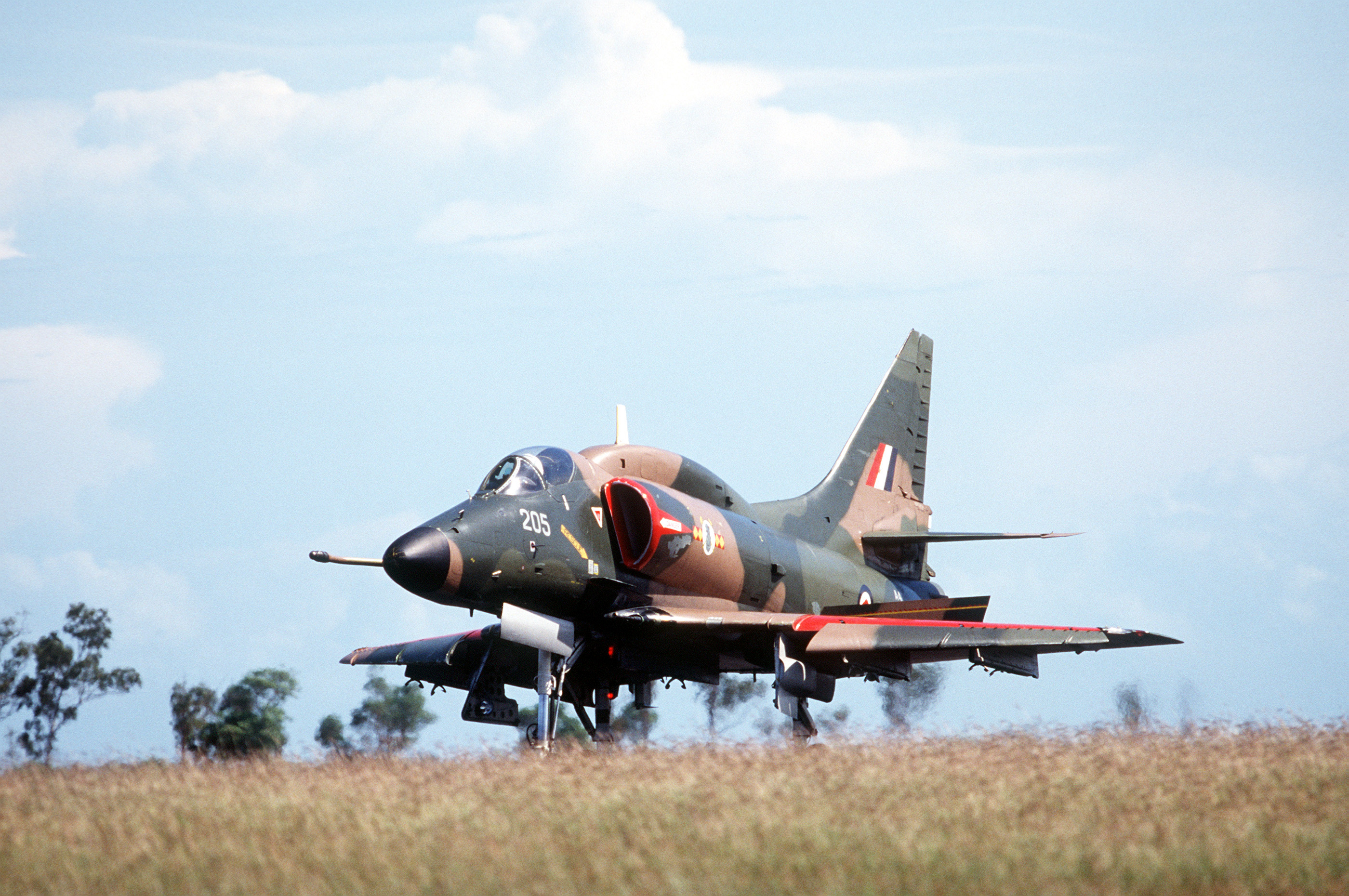
RNZAF A-4K on Exercise Pitch Black at Tindal

The Australian Government announced in February 2020 that it would spend $1.1 billion upgrading RAAF Base Tindal to expand Australian and US air force capabilities into the Indo-Pacific region. Works will include extending its runway and increasing fuel storage so that US long-range bombers and Australian refuelling aircraft can use the base. This project followed $500 million of works undertaken so that the base could efficiently operate Lockheed Martin F-35 Lightning II fighters.

Modernisation work at Tindal is funded by the US government, and its scope was confirmed by Australian officials on 31 October 2022. Changes at the base include an expanded apron with space for six B-52s, facilities for squadron operations and maintenance infrastructure. The B-52 bombers are nuclear-capable, which has been met with some opposition and concern that their stationing will increase tension with China. The RAAF responded by stating that USA bombers have been visiting Australia since the 1980s and engaging in training exercises in Australia since 2005. Under the arrangement between the Australian and US governments, the US government will not tell Australia if the B-52 bombers are carrying nuclear weapons when they land at RAAF Base Tindal and the Australian government will not ask.

Once completed, the air base will better accommodate bomber formations as well as tankers and fighters, with work also affecting fuel and ammunition storage and mission planning buildings. Currently, Tindal is the permanent home of a single RAAF F-35A stealth fighter squadron. The cost of the squadron's operations and maintenance facilities at Tindal is estimated at $14.4 million, with the total value of base modernisation reaching $100 million.

Australian officials told reporters in 2022 that the project was in the "planning phase" and work was expected to be completed by the end of 2026.

== Usage ==
In 1997, an Antonov An-124 Ruslan aircraft carrying weapons and four helicopters belonging to the mercenary company Sandline International was diverted from its planned destination in Papua New Guinea to Tindal during the Sandline affair. The helicopters were subsequently stored at the base, without Sandline being charged rent. Two Mil Mi-17 troop carriers were sold in 1999, but the two remaining helicopters, Mil Mi-24 gunships, remained unsold. As of 2015, the Australian Defence Force was seeking to dispose of them during 2016. Both helicopters were buried at the Shoal Bay Landfill site near Darwin during 2016.

Australian F-111s and RNZAF A-4K Skyhawks were armed and on standby at the base ready to attack Indonesian forces and command systems during the tension in 1999 during the establishment of East Timor's independence and the deployment of the Australian-led International Force for East Timor.

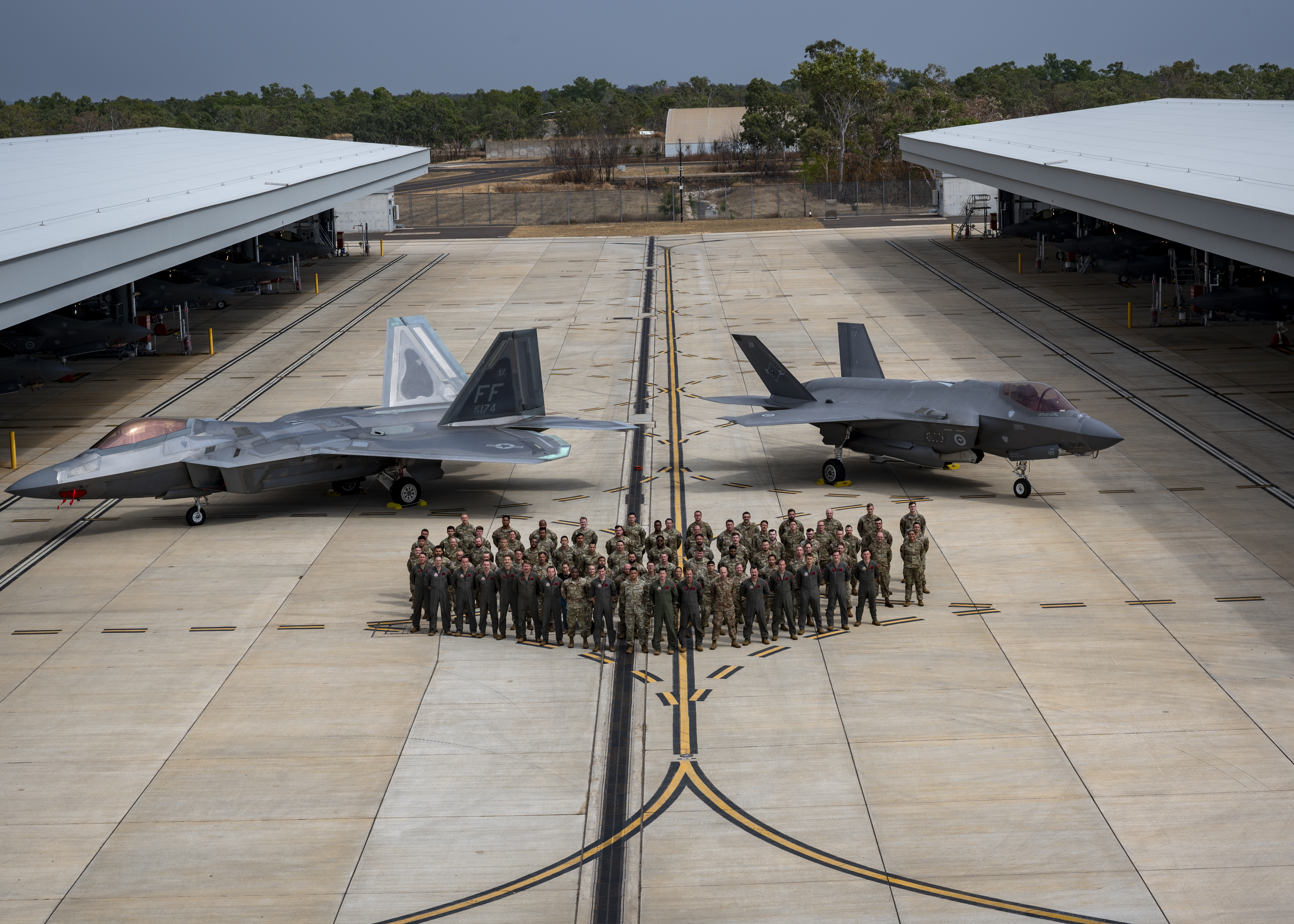
USAF and RAAF showcasing F-22 and F-35

=== United States ===
A USAF B-52 Stratofortress landing at RAAF Base Tindal during a temporary deployment of a bomber task force to the base

The United States Armed Forces use the base often for their overseas operations and training exercises. Some aircraft landed at Tindal owned by the United States includes:

- Lockheed Martin F-22 Raptor – as part of collaborative training such as Operation Pitch Black and regular rotations throughout the Northern Territory.
- Boeing B-52 Stratofortress – prior to current upgrades which when completed will allow the US to station up to 6 B-52 bombers at any given time at the air base.
- Northrop B-2 Spirit – multiple occasions; including maintenance and refuelling for US military operations in the Middle East, and crew change in 2016.

On 17 October 2024, the base was used to assist with strikes by USAF B-2As on hardened weapon storage facilities in Yemen owned by the Houthis in response to the latter's attacks on US and International Military and Civilian Vessels in the Red Sea.

== Military units ==
The following units are located at RAAF Base Tindal:

Unit name	Force Element Group	Equipment	Role
No. 75 Squadron	Air Combat Group	F-35A Lightning II	Multirole combat aircraft
No. 452 Squadron Tindal Flight	Surveillance and Response Group		Air traffic control
No. 3 Control and Reporting Unit Detachment Tindal	Surveillance and Response Group	Wakulda surveillance system	Aerial surveillance
No. 17 Squadron	Combat Support Group		Base services
No. 1 Airfield Operations Support Squadron Detachment Tindal	Combat Support Group		
No. 2 Expeditionary Health Squadron Detachment Tindal	Combat Support Group		
No. 2 Security Forces Squadron (2SECFOR)	Combat Support Group		

In addition, there is RAAF Military Police, who operate as part of the Joint Military Police Unit, as well as the Army's NORFORCE Regional Force Surveillance Unit which has a detachment located at Tindal.

== General aviation ==
A general aviation apron and civilian passenger terminal were built under an agreement between the RAAF and Katherine Town Council. The civilian area is known as Katherine Tindal Civilian Airport. Passenger aircraft as large as the Boeing 737 can use the airport.

== Airlines and destinations ==
Airlines	Destinations
Airnorth	Alice Springs, Darwin, Tennant Creek
Katherine Aviation	Borroloola, Gove, Groote Eylandt, Kalkaringi, Lajamanu, Ngukurr

== See also ==
- List of Royal Australian Air Force installations
- List of airports in the Northern Territory
