= RAAF Base Curtin =

Airport in Western Australia, Australia

- Curtin Airport
- Derby, Western Australia in Australia
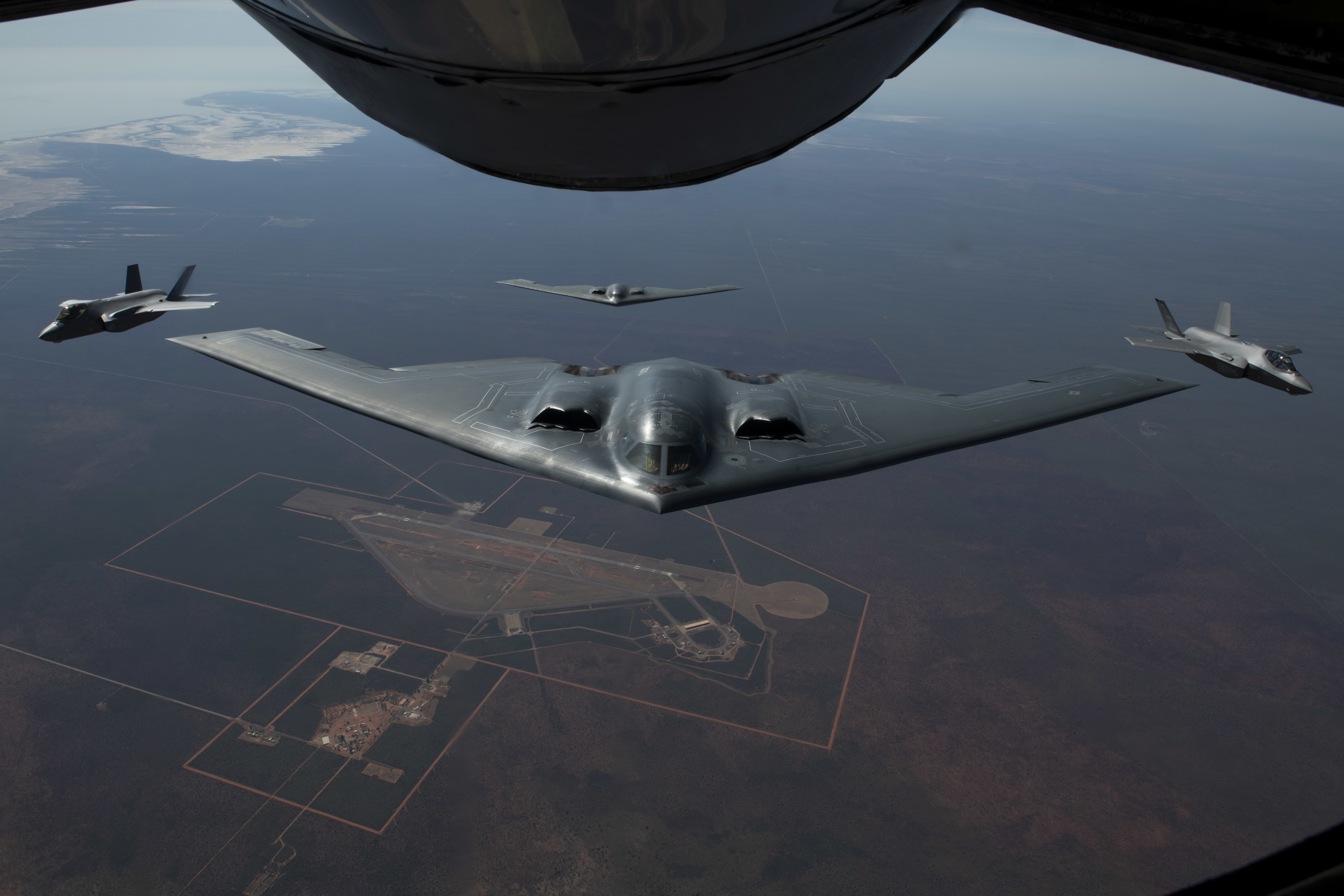
- Two USAF B-2 Spirit bombers and two RAAF F-35A Lightning II fighters over RAAF Base Curtin in 2022

Site information
- Type: Military airfield
- Owner: Department of Defence
- Operator: Royal Australian Air Force; Shire of Derby–West Kimberley
- Website: RAAF Base Curtin

Location
- Location in Western Australia
- Coordinates: 17°34′53″S 123°49′42″E
- Area: 25,000 hectares (62,000 acres)

Site history
- Built: 1983
- In use: 11 June 1988 – present

Garrison information
- Occupants: 'Bare base'

Airfield information
- Identifiers: IATA: DCN, ICAO: YCIN
- Elevation: 91 metres (300 ft) AMSL
Runways
Direction	Length and surface
11/29	3,049 metres (10,003 ft) Asphalt
- Sources: Australian AIP and aerodrome chart

RAAF Base Curtin, also sometimes RAAF Curtin (IATA: DCN, ICAO: YCIN) is a joint use Royal Australian Air Force (RAAF) military air base and civil airport located 19 nautical miles (35 km; 22 mi) southeast of the town of Derby, Western Australia. As it is one of the RAAF's three bare bases, no RAAF units are permanently based at Curtin and it is maintained by a small caretaker staff during peacetime.

The base is named in honour of former prime minister John Curtin.

== History ==
RAAF Curtin was the first new major military airfield to be built in Australia since World War II. Construction on the base began in 1983 and it was opened on 11 June 1988 by Prime Minister Bob Hawke. The 25,000-hectare (62,000-acre) base was activated twice by the RAAF between 1988 and 2013. It was activated again in 2016 as part of Exercise Northern Shield.

From the late 1990s the base operated as Curtin Immigration Reception and Processing Centre, an Australian Government immigration detention centre, which closed in September 2002. However the centre was reopened in April 2010 to house around sixty Sri Lankan and Afghan asylum seekers whose applications were suspended.

In 2007 direct flights recommenced between Perth and Derby (RAAF Curtin) for the first time since Ansett Australia stopped the service in 1992. However, the flights ceased in February 2016.

In 2016 and 2017 the Australian Government announced that facilities at Curtin would receive a A$100 to A$200 million upgrade, in addition to a range of other defence facilities in Western Australia.

== Climate ==
Climate data for Curtin RAAF Base, Western Australia
Month	Jan	Feb	Mar	Apr	May	Jun	Jul	Aug	Sep	Oct	Nov	Dec	Year
Record high °C (°F)	44.5 (112.1)	44.4 (111.9)	42.3 (108.1)	41.5 (106.7)	40.2 (104.4)	36.1 (97.0)	36.7 (98.1)	39.1 (102.4)	42.4 (108.3)	44.7 (112.5)	45.9 (114.6)	45.7 (114.3)	45.9 (114.6)
Mean daily maximum °C (°F)	36.3 (97.3)	35.5 (95.9)	36.2 (97.2)	36.5 (97.7)	33.3 (91.9)	30.8 (87.4)	31.0 (87.8)	33.2 (91.8)	36.6 (97.9)	39.0 (102.2)	39.9 (103.8)	38.3 (100.9)	35.6 (96.1)
Mean daily minimum °C (°F)	25.0 (77.0)	24.6 (76.3)	24.2 (75.6)	22.3 (72.1)	19.1 (66.4)	16.7 (62.1)	15.5 (59.9)	15.8 (60.4)	18.3 (64.9)	21.8 (71.2)	24.2 (75.6)	25.1 (77.2)	21.0 (69.8)
Record low °C (°F)	16.0 (60.8)	16.0 (60.8)	14.6 (58.3)	11.4 (52.5)	9.0 (48.2)	8.5 (47.3)	6.2 (43.2)	6.9 (44.4)	8.1 (46.6)	13.2 (55.8)	15.0 (59.0)	16.0 (60.8)	6.2 (43.2)
Average precipitation mm (inches)	225.0 (8.86)	197.8 (7.79)	148.0 (5.83)	39.2 (1.54)	13.7 (0.54)	7.9 (0.31)	8.6 (0.34)	2.5 (0.10)	0.1 (0.00)	7.5 (0.30)	21.9 (0.86)	153.6 (6.05)	838.2 (33.00)
Average rainy days	14.4	13.2	10.8	3.3	1.8	1.0	0.7	0.3	0.3	1.6	3.7	10.8	61.9

== See also ==
- List of airports in Western Australia
- List of Royal Australian Air Force installations
