= RAAF Base Scherger =

Military airbase in Queensland, Australia

- Near Weipa, Queensland in Australia
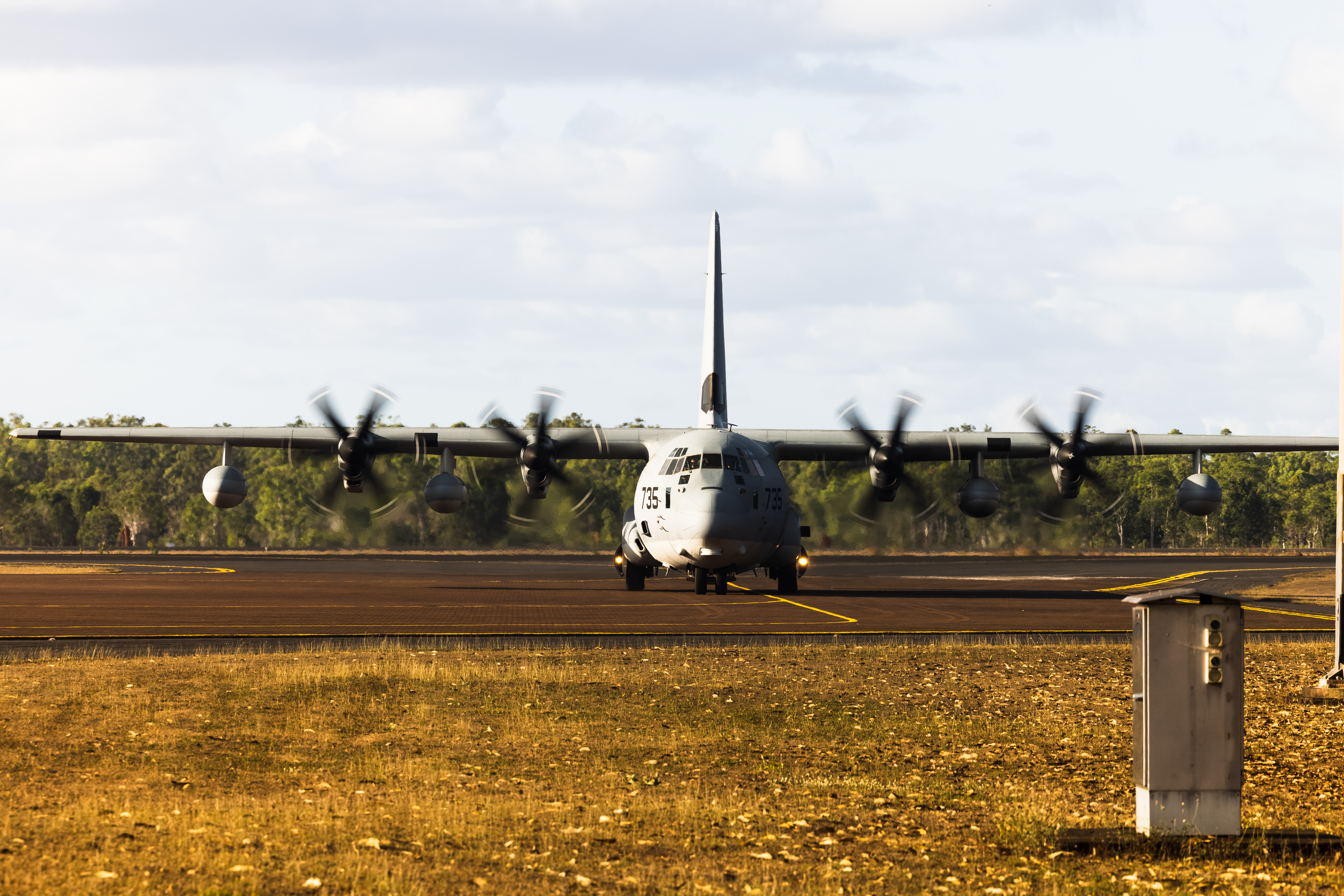
- A U.S. Marine Corps KC-130J Hercules positions for takeoff during Exercise Talisman Sabre 2023

Site information
- Type: Military air base
- Owner: Department of Defence
- Operator: Royal Australian Air Force
- Website: RAAF Base Scherger

Location
- Location in Queensland
- Coordinates: 12°37′24″S 142°05′12″E

Site history
- In use: 5 August 1998 – present

Garrison information
- Occupants: 'Bare base'

Airfield information
- Identifiers: ICAO: YBSG
- Elevation: 44 metres (145 ft) AMSL
Runways
Direction	Length and surface
12/30	3,049 metres (10,003 ft) Asphalt

RAAF Base Scherger (ICAO: YBSG) is a Royal Australian Air Force (RAAF) military air base located approximately 26 km (16 mi) east of Weipa on the western side of Cape York Peninsula in Queensland, Australia. One of three bare bases in a chain of bases across Australia's top end, the base is occupied by a caretaker staff and can be activated at relatively short notice. The base was constructed by troops drawn mainly from the 17th Construction Squadron, in what is believed to have been the biggest project undertaken by the Royal Australian Engineers at the time.

Opened on 5 August 1998 by the Prime Minister, John Howard, the base was named in honour of Air Chief Marshal Sir Frederick Scherger who was the Australian Chief of the Air Staff (now known as Chief of Air Force) from March 1957 to May 1961 and the equivalent of what is now Chief of the Defence Force from 1961 to 1966.

== Climate ==
Scherger RAAF has a tropical savanna climate (Köppen: Aw) with a wet season from November to April and a dry season from May to October. The wettest recorded day was 23 January 2013 with 366.8 mm (14.44 in) of rainfall. Extreme temperatures ranged from 37.9 °C (100.2 °F) on 3 January 2007 to 10.6 °C (51.1 °F) on 19 July 2024.

Climate data for Scherger RAAF (12.62°S 142.09°E) (39 m (128 ft) AMSL) (2005-2025)
Month	Jan	Feb	Mar	Apr	May	Jun	Jul	Aug	Sep	Oct	Nov	Dec	Year
Record high °C (°F)	37.9 (100.2)	36.2 (97.2)	38.2 (100.8)	35.1 (95.2)	35.4 (95.7)	34.0 (93.2)	35.2 (95.4)	36.2 (97.2)	39.3 (102.7)	40.1 (104.2)	40.0 (104.0)	40.0 (104.0)	40.1 (104.2)
Mean daily maximum °C (°F)	32.2 (90.0)	32.0 (89.6)	32.3 (90.1)	32.4 (90.3)	31.7 (89.1)	31.0 (87.8)	31.0 (87.8)	32.5 (90.5)	34.3 (93.7)	36.1 (97.0)	36.6 (97.9)	34.8 (94.6)	33.1 (91.5)
Mean daily minimum °C (°F)	24.2 (75.6)	24.2 (75.6)	23.9 (75.0)	22.9 (73.2)	21.5 (70.7)	20.1 (68.2)	19.2 (66.6)	19.1 (66.4)	20.4 (68.7)	21.9 (71.4)	23.5 (74.3)	24.2 (75.6)	22.1 (71.8)
Record low °C (°F)	20.1 (68.2)	20.4 (68.7)	20.5 (68.9)	17.9 (64.2)	11.9 (53.4)	11.7 (53.1)	10.6 (51.1)	13.6 (56.5)	14.7 (58.5)	15.9 (60.6)	18.5 (65.3)	19.7 (67.5)	10.6 (51.1)
Average precipitation mm (inches)	530.0 (20.87)	412.6 (16.24)	359.4 (14.15)	128.7 (5.07)	22.9 (0.90)	3.9 (0.15)	1.7 (0.07)	5.1 (0.20)	4.5 (0.18)	21.6 (0.85)	87.5 (3.44)	241.4 (9.50)	1,823.8 (71.80)
Average precipitation days (≥ 0.2 mm)	23.6	21.9	23.3	14.1	4.0	2.7	2.2	1.9	1.4	2.7	7.2	16.7	121.7
Source: Bureau of Meteorology (2005-2025)

== Role and facilities ==
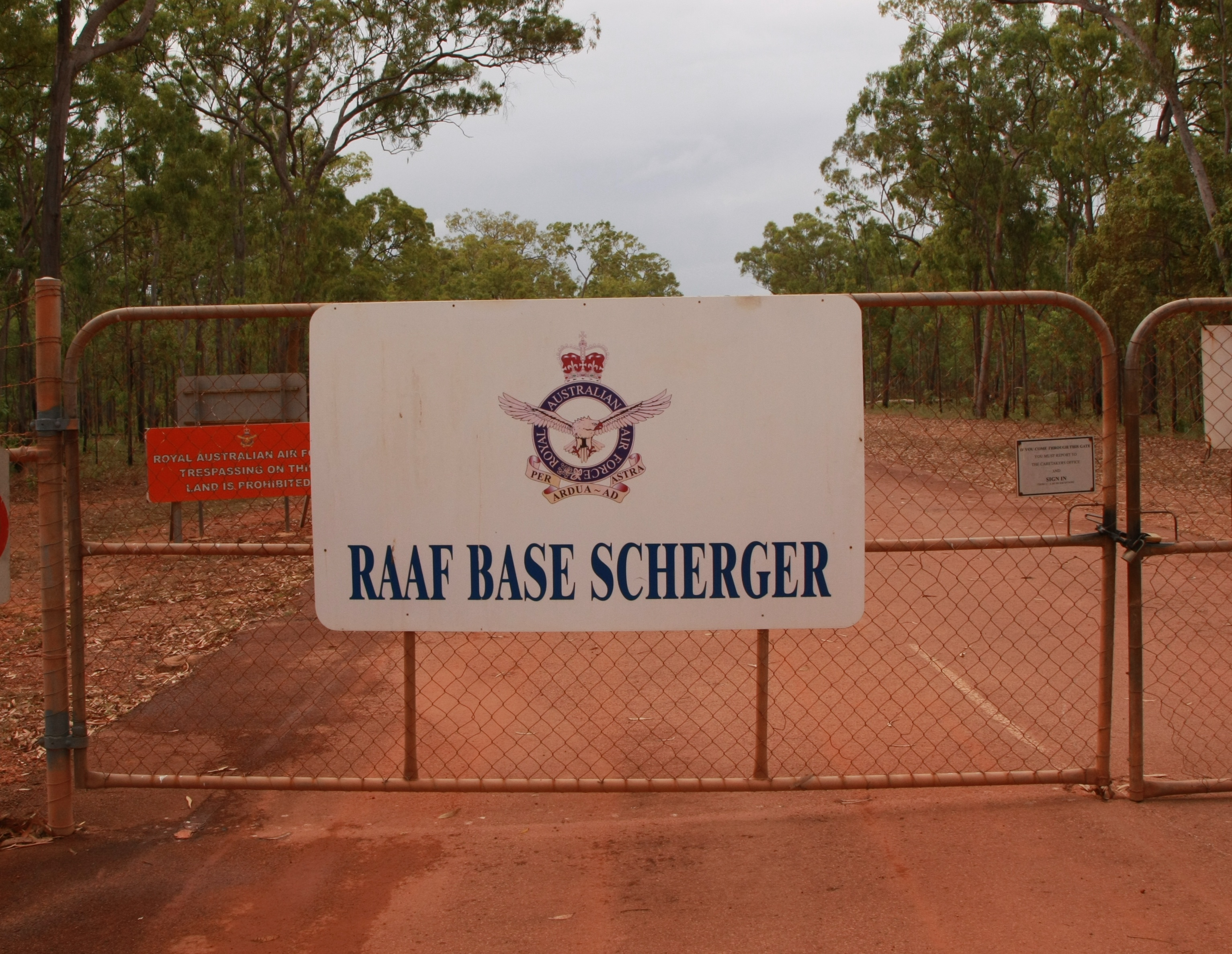
A gate to RAAF Base Scherger, seen in 2010

As a 'bare base' Scherger's role is to provide the RAAF and other services with the necessary infrastructure to support forward deployed forces during a crisis. While the base has facilities to cater for 400 personnel in fixed accommodation, 1,000 personnel in tent lines and about 40 aircraft, it is normally only staffed by four Air Force personnel who are responsible for caretaker duties. During peacetime RAAF Base Scherger hosts, on average, one major exercise per year in which the base is fully activated through the arrival of RAAF units based elsewhere in Australia.

=== Scherger Immigration Detention Centre ===
In October 2010, the Scherger Immigration Detention Centre was opened at Scherger RAAF Base, and this facility provided accommodation for 300 single adult males, with a maximum capacity of 596 males. The centre closed in 2014.

== See also ==
- List of airports in Queensland
- List of Royal Australian Air Force installations
