= RAAF Base Learmonth =

Air Force base in Western Australia

- Near Exmouth, Western Australia in Australia

Site information
- Type: Military air base
- Owner: Department of Defence
- Operator: Royal Australian Air Force
- Website: RAAF Base Learmonth

Location
- Location in Western Australia
- Coordinates: 22°14′09″S 114°05′19″E

Site history
- In use: circa 1950s – present

Garrison information
- Occupants: 'Bare base'

Airfield information
- Identifiers: IATA: LEA, ICAO: YPLM
- Elevation: 6 metres (19 ft) AMSL
Runways
| Direction | Length and surface |
|---|---|
| 18/36 | 3,047 metres (9,997 ft) asphalt/concrete |
- Sources: Australian AIP and aerodrome chart

Commonwealth Heritage List
- Official name: Learmonth Air Weapons Range Facility
- Type: Listed place (Historic)
- Designated: 22 June 2004
- Reference no.: 105551

RAAF Base Learmonth, also known as Learmonth Airport (IATA: LEA, ICAO: YPLM), is a joint use Royal Australian Air Force base and civil airport. It is located near the town of Exmouth on the north-west coast of Western Australia. RAAF Base Learmonth is one of the RAAF's three bare bases. It is maintained by the RAAF's 25 Squadron and a small caretaker staff during peacetime.

The RAAF also operates the Learmonth Air Weapons Range which covers about 18,954 ha (46,840 acres) and is located 30 km (19 mi) south-west of the airbase.

== History ==
During World War II a little-known landing field was constructed on the western shore of Exmouth Gulf. It was code-named "Potshot" and maintained by No. 76 Operational Base Unit, in support of Operation Potshot. In the 1950s the landing field was further developed as a military base and named RAAF Learmonth in honour of Wing Commander Charles Learmonth DFC and Bar, who, while leading No. 14 Squadron, was killed in a flying accident off Rottnest Island, Western Australia on 6 January 1944.

Starting in June 1944, Qantas used Learmonth as an intermediate stop for two converted Consolidated Liberator bombers that flew a segment of the vital England–Australia air route, supplementing modified Consolidated PBY Catalinas flying The Double Sunrise route to Ceylon. The Liberators flew a shorter 4,952-kilometre (3,077 mi) over-water route from Learmonth to an airfield northeast of Colombo, and could make the journey in 17 hours with 2,500 kilograms (5,500 lb) of payload, whereas the Catalinas usually required at least 27 hours and had to carry so much auxiliary fuel that their payload was limited to only 450 kilograms (1,000 lb). The route was named Kangaroo Service and marked the first time that Qantas's now-famous kangaroo logo was used; passengers received a certificate proclaiming them as members of The Order of the Longest Hop. Qantas would again use the base, much later, during the emergency landing of Qantas Flight 72.

In the mid-1960s, the Federal Government gave its support to plans by the Chief of the Air Staff, Air Marshal Val Hancock, to redevelop Learmonth as a bare base, due to its proximity to Indonesia. Though F-111Cs could have made a round-trip to Indonesia's capital, Jakarta, from RAAF Base Darwin, the route they took would have been very much limited by range. Learmonth's relative proximity added flexibility to the routes in and out, enhancing the likelihood of a successful strike. The major work was undertaken by No. 5 Airfield Construction Squadron between 1971 and 1973.

In October 2022, Qantas announced they would be servicing Melbourne-Exmouth flights for the first time from April to October 2023.

== Climate ==
Learmonth has a hot desert climate (Köppen: BWh); with very hot summers, pleasant winters and highly erratic rainfall. The town is extremely sunny, experiencing 229.8 clear days and only 49.9 cloudy days on average per annum. Extreme temperatures have ranged from 48.9 °C (120.0 °F) on 2 January 2010 to 3.5 °C (38.3 °F) on 10 July 2017. The wettest recorded day was 28 March 2026 with 280.0 mm (11.02 in) of rainfall due to a tropical cyclone.

Climate data for Learmonth Airport (22.24°S 114.10°E) (5 m (16 ft) AMSL) (1945-2025)
| Month | Jan | Feb | Mar | Apr | May | Jun | Jul | Aug | Sep | Oct | Nov | Dec | Year |
|---|---|---|---|---|---|---|---|---|---|---|---|---|---|
| Record high °C (°F) | 48.9 (120.0) | 47.7 (117.9) | 45.9 (114.6) | 42.5 (108.5) | 37.3 (99.1) | 31.9 (89.4) | 31.7 (89.1) | 35.7 (96.3) | 41.3 (106.3) | 43.0 (109.4) | 44.2 (111.6) | 48.9 (120.0) | 48.9 (120.0) |
| Mean daily maximum °C (°F) | 38.0 (100.4) | 37.6 (99.7) | 36.6 (97.9) | 33.4 (92.1) | 28.7 (83.7) | 24.9 (76.8) | 24.4 (75.9) | 26.6 (79.9) | 29.7 (85.5) | 33.0 (91.4) | 34.6 (94.3) | 37.1 (98.8) | 32.1 (89.7) |
| Mean daily minimum °C (°F) | 23.1 (73.6) | 24.1 (75.4) | 23.1 (73.6) | 20.4 (68.7) | 16.0 (60.8) | 13.1 (55.6) | 11.4 (52.5) | 12.2 (54.0) | 13.9 (57.0) | 16.5 (61.7) | 18.5 (65.3) | 21.0 (69.8) | 17.8 (64.0) |
| Record low °C (°F) | 16.1 (61.0) | 17.4 (63.3) | 15.0 (59.0) | 11.2 (52.2) | 7.6 (45.7) | 4.9 (40.8) | 3.5 (38.3) | 4.2 (39.6) | 5.6 (42.1) | 7.9 (46.2) | 12.0 (53.6) | 14.2 (57.6) | 3.5 (38.3) |
| Average precipitation mm (inches) | 29.6 (1.17) | 38.0 (1.50) | 39.7 (1.56) | 19.4 (0.76) | 41.3 (1.63) | 43.2 (1.70) | 20.7 (0.81) | 11.8 (0.46) | 2.2 (0.09) | 1.4 (0.06) | 1.8 (0.07) | 5.6 (0.22) | 255.2 (10.05) |
| Average precipitation days (≥ 0.2 mm) | 2.5 | 3.2 | 2.4 | 1.8 | 3.6 | 5.2 | 3.5 | 2.2 | 1.0 | 0.4 | 0.5 | 0.7 | 27 |
| Average afternoon relative humidity (%) | 33 | 39 | 35 | 36 | 40 | 45 | 41 | 35 | 28 | 25 | 27 | 29 | 34 |
| Average dew point °C (°F) | 15.4 (59.7) | 17.7 (63.9) | 15.4 (59.7) | 13.6 (56.5) | 11.2 (52.2) | 10.0 (50.0) | 8.0 (46.4) | 7.0 (44.6) | 6.3 (43.3) | 7.2 (45.0) | 10.0 (50.0) | 12.5 (54.5) | 11.2 (52.2) |
Source: Bureau of Meteorology (1945-2025)

== See also ==
- List of airports in Western Australia
- List of Royal Australian Air Force installations
