= No. 285 Squadron RAAF =

Royal Australian Air Force training squadron

- No. 285 Squadron's crest
- Active: 24 August 1999 – 8 December 2017
- Allegiance: Australia
- Branch: Royal Australian Air Force
- Role: C-130J Hercules training
- Part of: No. 84 Wing
- Base: RAAF Base Richmond
- Motto: "Aspire"
- Equipment: C-130J full-flight mission simulator

No. 285 Squadron was a Royal Australian Air Force (RAAF) training squadron. Controlled by No. 84 Wing, the squadron was formed in August 1999 to train the RAAF's Lockheed Martin C-130J Hercules aircrew and ground support staff. No. 285 Squadron did not control any flying aircraft but managed the flight simulator used for converting aircrew to the C-130Js operated by No. 37 Squadron. It was also allocated decommissioned Hercules airframes for training purposes, as well as flying aircraft from No. 37 Squadron when required. Throughout its existence, No. 285 Squadron was located at RAAF Base Richmond in the western suburbs of Sydney. The squadron was disbanded in December 2017.

== Role and equipment ==
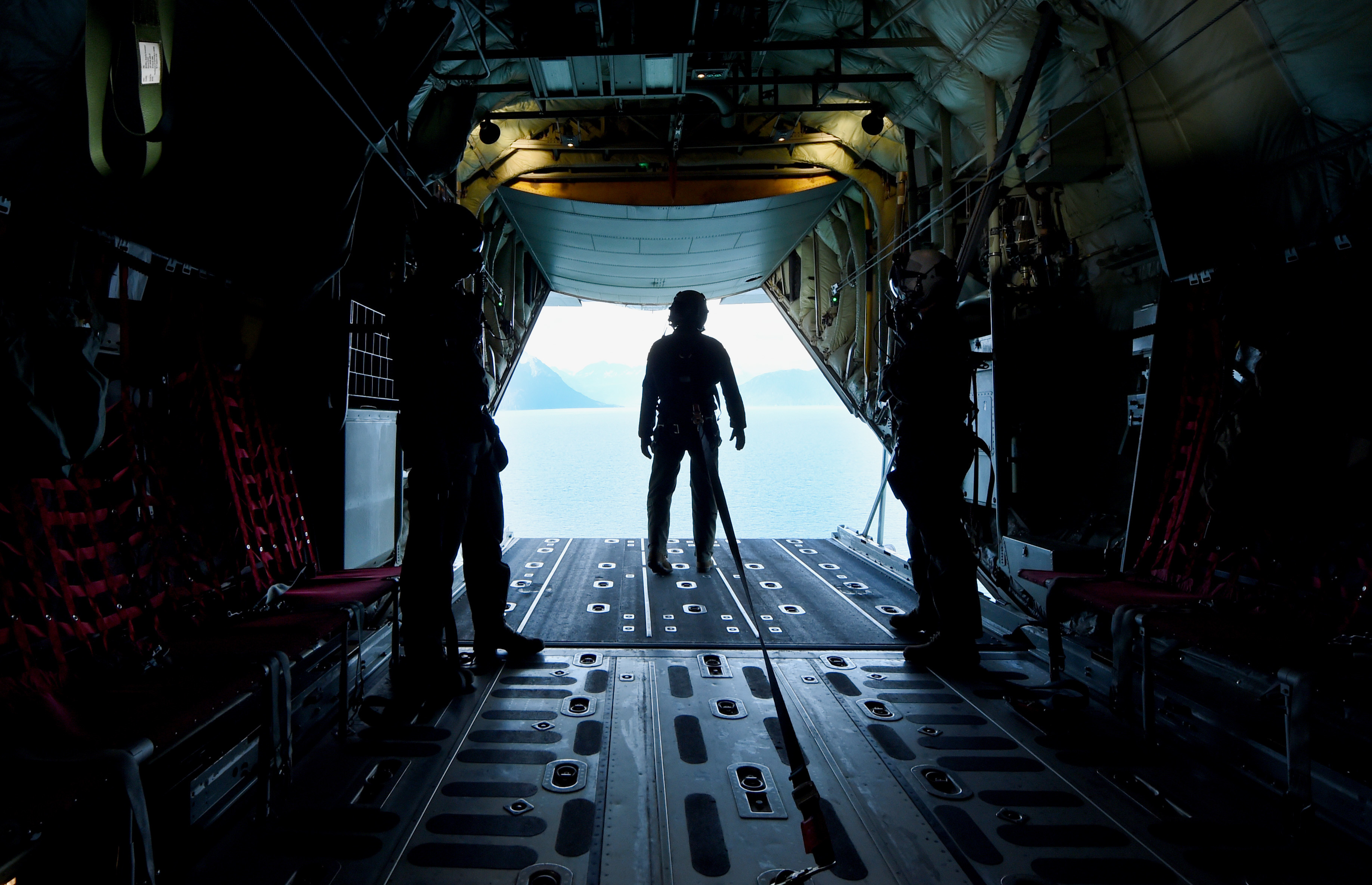
A member of No. 285 Squadron simulating a paratrooper jumping from the ramp of an RAAF C-130 Hercules, with members of No. 37 Squadron, during an exercise in August 2015

No. 285 Squadron was responsible for training aircrew and maintenance staff to operate the Lockheed Martin C-130J Hercules transport aircraft of the Royal Australian Air Force (RAAF). It was located at RAAF Base Richmond, New South Wales, and controlled by No. 84 Wing, part of Air Mobility Group. The squadron's motto was "Aspire".

Twelve C-130Js are operated by No. 37 Squadron, also based at Richmond under No. 84 Wing. The aircraft are generally crewed by two pilots and a loadmaster, and tasked with medium tactical airlift in Australia and overseas, transporting troops and cargo, and conducting medical evacuation, search-and-rescue, and airdrop missions. No. 285 Squadron managed the full-flight mission simulator (FFMS) used to convert aircrew to the C-130J, as well as decommissioned Hercules airframes used for loadmaster training. It also employed computer-based training tools and was allocated flying aircraft from No. 37 Squadron when required. As well as training aircrew new to the C-130J, the FFMS (maintained by CAE Australia) was employed for existing aircrew to maintain their currency.

No. 285 Squadron generally held two pilot and navigator conversion courses per year. Each six-month course included approximately 120 hours in the FFMS and 30 hours in flying aircraft. It culminated in an airborne operation module, which included formation flying, airdrops, night landings with night-vision goggles, and simulated combat utilising the C-130's self-defence systems to prepare the aircrew for conditions in Middle East deployments. Following this exercise, the new C-130 aircrew were posted to No. 37 Squadron. No. 285 Squadron could run 30 or more courses each year for ground support staff; these courses could last from one day to five weeks.

== History ==
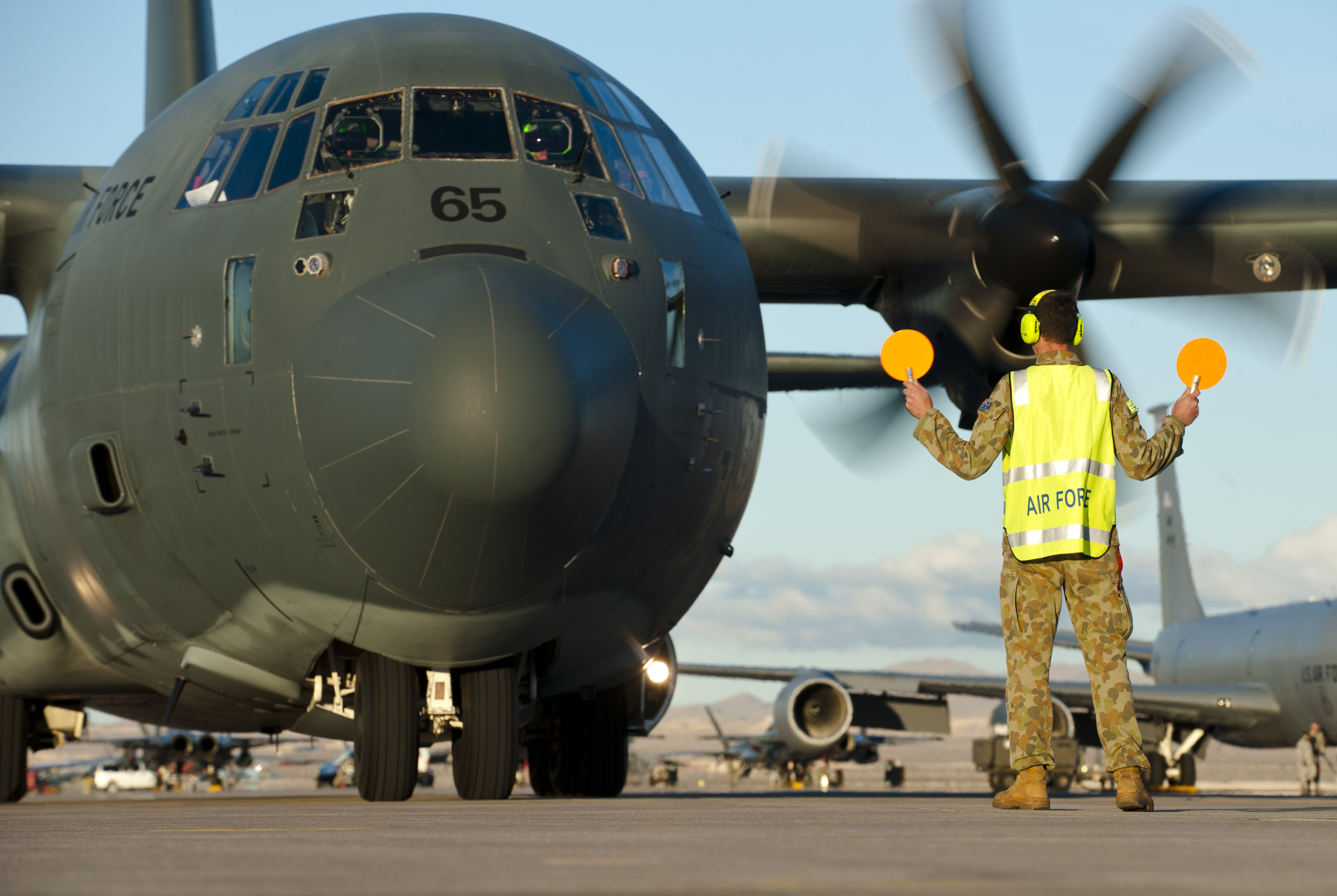
RAAF C-130J Hercules during exercise in January 2015

No. 285 Squadron was formed on 24 August 1999 at RAAF Base Richmond under the command of Squadron Leader Peter "Zip" Szypula. Coming under the control of the newly re-formed No. 85 Wing, the squadron took over the training functions of No. 33 Squadron (operating Boeing 707s), No. 36 Squadron (C-130H Hercules), No. 37 Squadron (C-130J Hercules) and No. 503 Wing (aircraft maintenance). It was equipped with three flight simulators: one 707, one C-130H and one C-130J. The squadron began operating a full-flight mission simulator (FFMS) for the C-130Hs in 2003, coinciding with the deployment of C-130Hs to the Middle East. Replacing a more basic C-130H simulator, the FFMS was used to train pilots, navigators and flight engineers. By mid-2006, No. 85 Wing had been disbanded and No. 285 Squadron was under the control of No. 84 Wing at Richmond. RAAF Hercules operations were concentrated in No. 37 Squadron in November 2006, when No. 36 Squadron transferred its C-130Hs prior to re-equipping with Boeing C-17 Globemaster III heavy airlifters and relocating to RAAF Base Amberley, Queensland.

The Boeing 707 was retired from service in June 2008. In April 2009, No. 285 Squadron was named the most proficient RAAF training unit of the previous year. No. 37 Squadron joined No. 285 Squadron under No. 84 Wing in October 2010, when it was transferred from No. 86 Wing. The C-130Hs were retired in 2012, and with them No. 285 Squadron's C-130H simulator; the simulator remained at Richmond until 2016, when it was sent to Jakarta to support training for the Indonesian Air Force's fleet of ex-RAAF C-130Hs. No. 285 Squadron was jointly responsible (with No. 33 Squadron) for training flight attendants for the RAAF's VIP jets until 2015, when No. 34 Squadron established its own training section and took over the task. The C-130J FFMS was networked to a virtual exercise in August 2015, allowing aircrew operating the simulator at No. 285 Squadron to interact for the first time with other exercise participants in Australia, the US and the UK. By February 2016, according to No. 285 Squadron's commanding officer, ninety per cent of C-130 flying training was conducted in the FFMS. In March, a commemorative cairn and garden was unveiled at Richmond in tribute to the squadron's inaugural commanding officer, "Zip" Szypula, who died in March 2001 with his partner and her daughter in an avalanche in the Himalayas, while preparing to climb Mount Everest.

No. 285 Squadron was disbanded on 8 December 2017. Its role and most of its personnel were transferred to a re-established Training Flight in No. 37 Squadron.

== See also ==
- Lockheed C-130 Hercules in Australian service
