= No. 84 Wing RAAF =

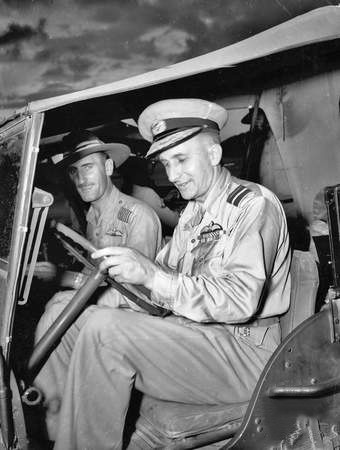
- Group Captain Bill Hely (left), Officer Commanding No. 84 Wing, with the Chief of the Air Staff, Air Vice-Marshal George Jones, at Torokina, Bougainville, in February 1945
- Active: 1944–46; 1991–current
- Country: Australia
- Branch: Royal Australian Air Force
- Role: Transport
- Part of: Air Mobility Group
- Headquarters: RAAF Base Richmond
- Motto(s): Guide and Deliver
- Aircraft: Lockheed Martin C-130J Super Hercules; Alenia C-27J Spartan
- Engagements: World War II: South West Pacific theatre; Bougainville Campaign; War in Afghanistan; War in Iraq
- Decorations: Meritorious Unit Citation

Commanders
- Notable commanders: William Hely (1944–45)

No. 84 Wing is a Royal Australian Air Force (RAAF) transport wing. Coming under the control of Air Mobility Group (AMG), it is headquartered at RAAF Base Richmond, New South Wales. The wing comprises No. 35 Squadron, operating Aliena C-27J Spartan transport Aircraft; No. 37 Squadron, operating Lockheed Martin C-130J Super Hercules medium transports; and a technical training unit, No. 285 Squadron.

Formed in 1944 for army co-operation duties in the South West Pacific theatre of World War II, No. 84 Wing operated a mix of aircraft including CAC Boomerangs, CAC Wirraways, Auster AOPs and Bristol Beauforts, before disbanding in 1946. It was re-formed in 1991 as a tactical transport wing headquartered at RAAF Base Townsville, Queensland, comprising Nos. 35 and 38 Squadrons operating de Havilland Canada DHC-4 Caribous. By 1996, it had been augmented by No. 32 Squadron, operating Hawker Siddeley HS 748 trainer-transports.

In 1998, No. 84 Wing was reorganised as a special transport wing, headquartered at Richmond. The Caribous were transferred to No. 86 Wing and No. 84 Wing took over responsibility for No. 33 Squadron, operating Boeing 707 tanker-transports, and No. 34 Squadron, operating VIP transports, in addition to controlling No. 32 Squadron. By mid-2006, No. 32 Squadron had converted to Beech King Air 350s and transferred to Air Force Training Group, while No. 84 Wing had assumed control of No. 285 Squadron and Air Movements Training and Development Unit (AMTDU). AMTDU was subsequently moved under the direct aegis of ALG, and No. 33 Squadron under No. 86 Wing, following the retirement of the 707s. No. 37 Squadron, by then the RAAF's sole Hercules unit, was transferred from No. 86 Wing to No. 84 Wing in 2010. No. 35 Squadron, which had been merged with No. 38 Squadron in 2000, was re-formed under No. 84 Wing in 2013 to operate Alenia C-27J Spartan tactical transport commencing in 2015; the squadron was detached from the wing in January 2014 but is scheduled to return as the Spartan becomes operational.

== History ==
=== Army cooperation formation ===
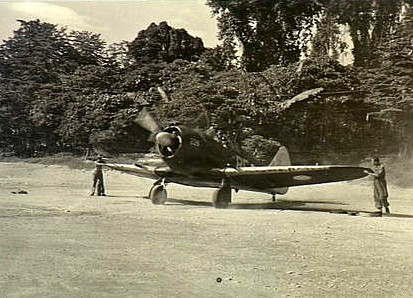
Boomerang of No. 5 Squadron on Bougainville

The Royal Australian Air Force (RAAF) established two army cooperation wings in the South West Pacific Theatre late in World War II. They were, as described by the official history of the RAAF in the Pacific, "essentially non-offensive in character", responsible for reconnaissance, artillery spotting, supply drops to ground forces, spraying DDT to combat malaria, and guiding close support aircraft to their objectives. The wing's aircraft could also carry out their own strikes on "targets of opportunity".

No. 84 (Army Cooperation) Wing was formed on 11 September 1944 in Cairns, Queensland. Commanded by Group Captain Bill Hely, it comprised No. 5 (Tactical Reconnaissance) Squadron, No. 17 Air Observation Post (AOP) Flight, No. 10 Communication Unit, and No. 39 Operational Base Unit. The wing arrived at Torokina in October to begin supporting Australian troops during the Bougainville Campaign. No. 5 Squadron, equipped with eighteen CAC Boomerangs and four CAC Wirraways, was assigned to mark targets for F4U Corsairs of the Royal New Zealand Air Force. The Austers of No. 17 AOP Flight were used for reconnaissance and courier work, becoming, in the words of the official history, "the eyes of the battalion commanders". No. 10 Communications Unit flew Avro Ansons and Bristol Beauforts on courier, reconnaissance, supply, and anti-malarial spraying missions; it was renamed No. 10 Local Air Supply Unit in March 1945. Between December 1944 and January 1945, the wing lost one Auster, one Wirraway, and one Boomerang on operations.

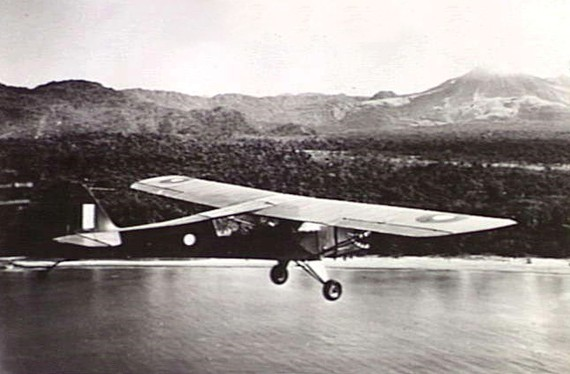
Auster of No. 17 AOP Flight over Bougainville

Despite suffering shortages of pilots and equipment, No. 84 Wing was generally able to keep pace with the army's requirements. A detachment of No. 36 Squadron, flying C-47 Dakotas, was employed to augment the wing's supply capabilities. Up until the end of June 1945, No. 5 Squadron had flown almost 2,000 sorties and No. 17 AOP Flight over 1,300, while No. 10 Local Air Supply Unit and the No. 36 Squadron detachment had accounted for almost 1,000 between them. As the navigational efficiency of the New Zealander pilots increased, demands on the Boomerangs and Wirraways lessened, and the bulk of the reconnaissance duties fell to the Austers of No. 17 AOP Flight.

When the Pacific War ended in August 1945, No. 10 Local Air Supply Unit was tasked with dropping leaflets announcing the news over Japanese positions. That month, Group Captain D.R. Chapman succeeded Hely as No. 84 Wing's commander. The end of hostilities led to morale problems owing to inactivity and the uncertainties of demobilisation; Chapman sent Northern Command headquarters a frank report to this effect, its tone earning him a rebuke from the Air Officer Commanding, Air Commodore Allan Walters. No. 17 AOP Flight was disbanded on Bougainville in December, followed a month later by No. 10 Local Air Supply Unit. No. 5 Squadron transferred to RAAF Station Pearce, Western Australia, in January 1946, and disbanded in October that year. No. 84 Wing headquarters completed "reduction to nucleus" at Bougainville on 29 January 1946. It departed Torakina and arrived in Essendon, Victoria, on 28 February, disbanding there on 6 March.

=== Transport formation ===
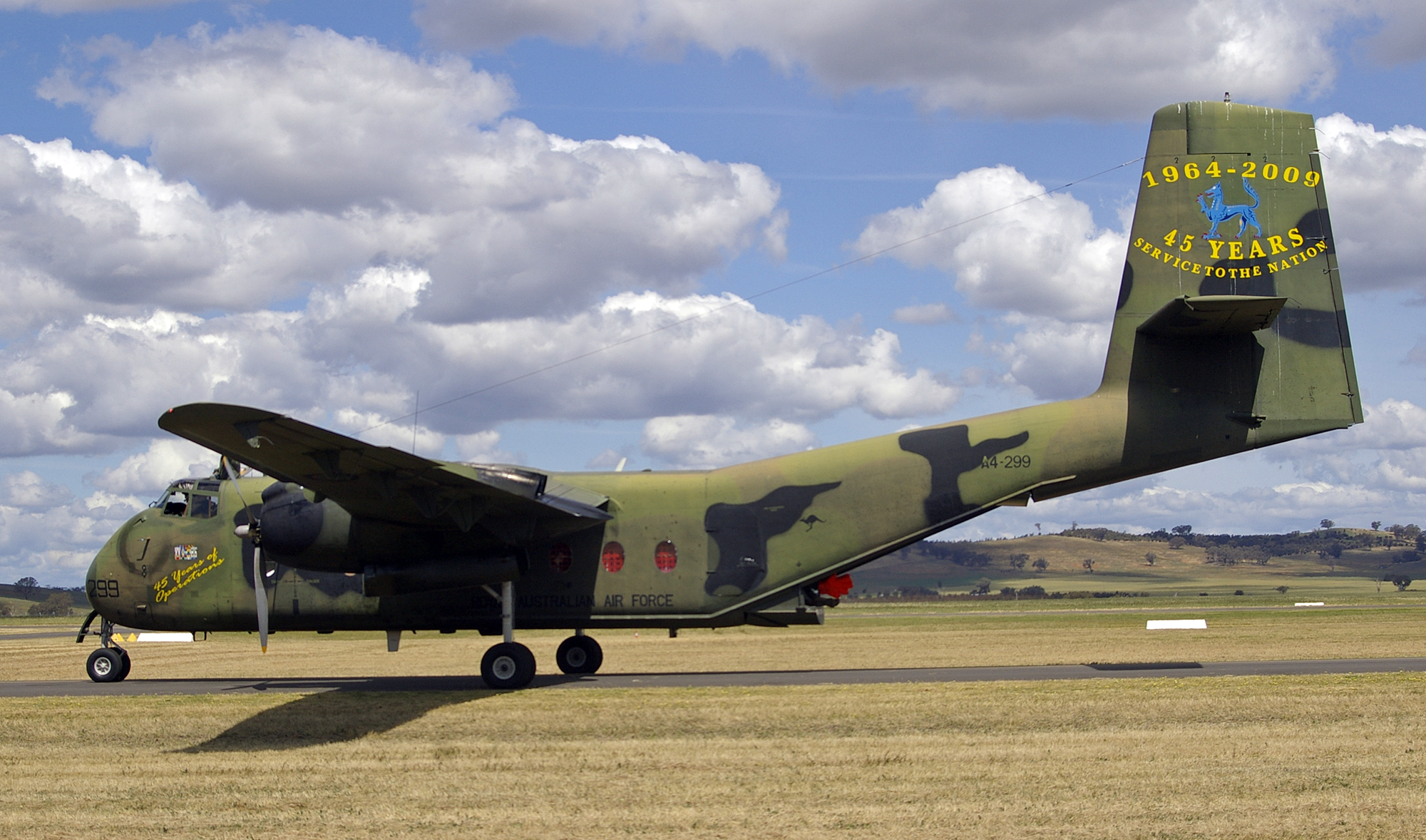
RAAF DHC-4 Caribou

No. 84 Wing was re-established as a tactical transport wing under the newly formed Operational Support Group (OSG) at RAAF Base Townsville, Queensland, in February 1991. It comprised two squadrons of de Havilland DHC-4 Caribous: No. 35 Squadron, located at Townsville, and No. 38 Squadron, located at RAAF Base Richmond, New South Wales. Prior to this, the two squadrons had been under the control of Tactical Transport Group, OSG's predecessor at Townsville. No. 84 Wing's primary purpose was to support Australian Army operations and exercises, as well as the Parachute Training School at HMAS Albatross in Nowra, New South Wales. It also maintained detachments for search-and-rescue and local transport duties at RAAF Base Darwin, Northern Territory, and RAAF Base Pearce, Western Australia. The Pearce detachment (No. 38 Squadron Detachment A) was formed from No. 2 Flying Training School's Caribou Flight on 1 March 1991. In addition to their military role, the Caribous provided assistance to the civil community in the form of disaster relief and medical evacuation. The aircraft frequently operated in Papua New Guinea, for training and humanitarian missions. No. 38 Squadron, responsible for all Caribou aircrew conversion and operations training, transferred to RAAF Base Amberley, Queensland, in October 1992. Beginning the following month, seven of the fleet's twenty-one Caribous were retired to storage at Amberley for use as spare parts. By mid-1996, No. 84 Wing was under the control of Air Lift Group (ALG), located at Richmond, and had been augmented by No. 32 Squadron, operating Hawker Siddeley HS 748s for navigational training, VIP transport, and fisheries surveillance out of RAAF Base East Sale in Victoria.

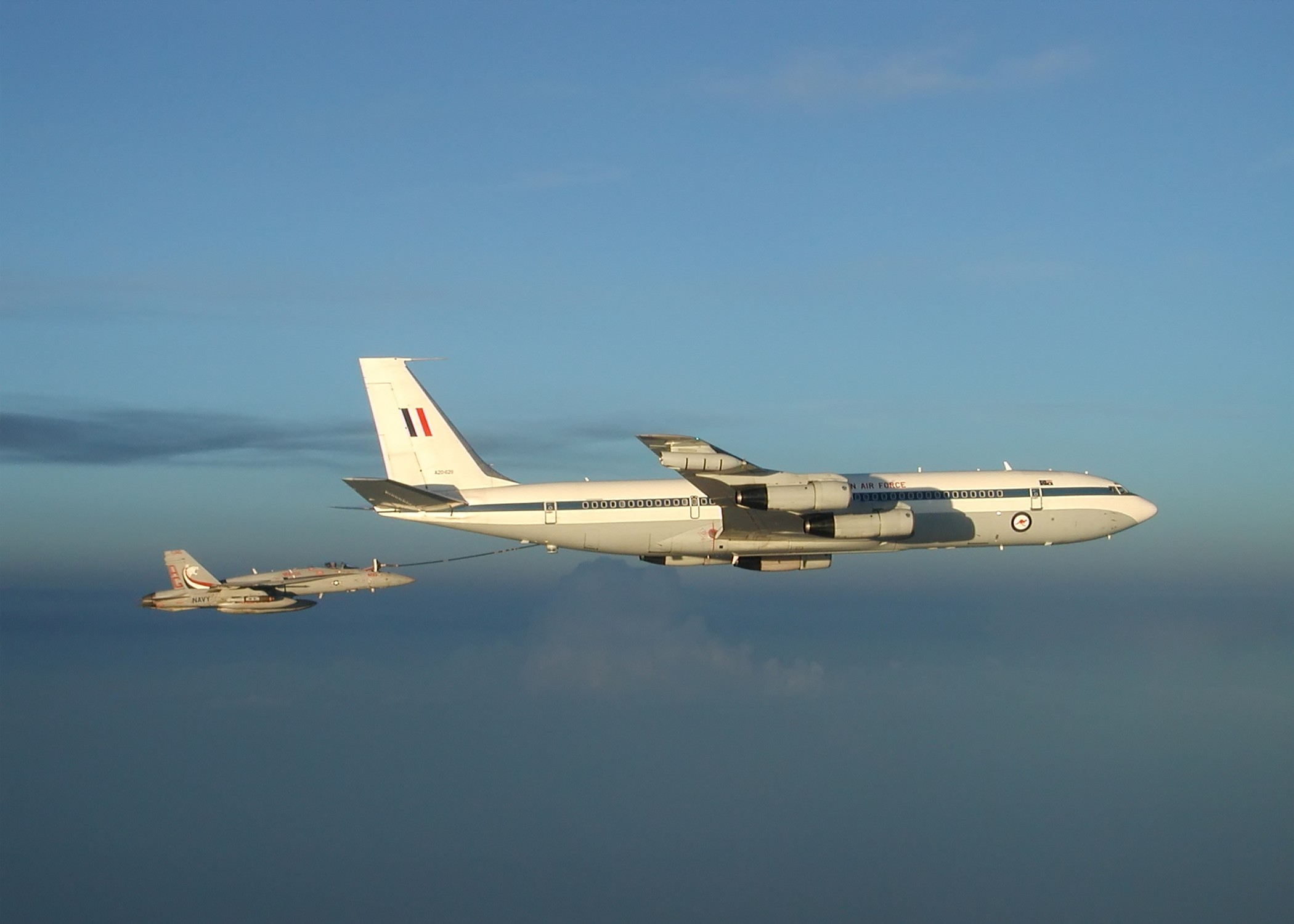
No. 33 Squadron 707 refuelling a US Navy F/A-18 Hornet during the war in Afghanistan, April 2002

In January 1998, No. 84 Wing was reorganised as a special transport wing under ALG, "special transport" meaning activities not directly related to army support, such as carrying VIPs. Its headquarters was relocated to Richmond. In addition to No. 32 Squadron, its complement included No. 33 Squadron, operating Boeing 707s for air-to-air refuelling and VIP transport out of Richmond, and No. 34 Squadron, operating Falcon 900s for VIP transport out of RAAF Base Fairbairn in Canberra. Nos. 35 and 38 Squadrons meanwhile transferred to No. 86 Wing, also headquartered at Richmond. Two of No. 33 Squadron's five 707s were soon employed to form No. 84 Wing Detachment A in Kuwait, as part of Operation Southern Watch. On 5 March, one of the 707s undertook the first operational aerial tanker mission since the squadron's re-formation in 1983, when it refuelled six Panavia Tornados of the Royal Air Force (RAF) over Saudi Arabia. The detachment subsequently refuelled US EA-6 Prowlers, F/A-18 Hornets, and AV-8 Harriers, as well as RAF Harriers, in addition to the Tornados. From March to September 2002, two 707s formed No. 84 Wing Detachment as part of Australia's contribution to the war in Afghanistan. Located at Manas Air Base in Kyrgyzstan, the 707s provided aerial refuelling to coalition aircraft operating in the theatre, their efforts earning No. 84 Wing a Meritorious Unit Citation.

No. 34 Squadron's fleet of five Falcon 900s was replaced by two Boeing 737 Business Jets and three Bombardier Challenger 604s in July 2002. The arrival of the new jets also permitted the Air Force to cease using No. 33 Squadron's 707s in the VIP transport role. In concert with the No. 84 Wing Navigation Training Aircraft Detachment, No. 32 Squadron completed its conversion from the HS 748 to the Beech King Air 350 in December 2004. By mid-2006, the squadron had been transferred to Air Force Training Group and No. 84 Wing had assumed control of two Richmond-based units from the defunct No. 85 Wing, No. 285 Squadron and the Air Movements Training and Development Unit (AMTDU). No. 285 Squadron undertook instruction of technical staff, and ground-based aircrew training using Hercules and Boeing 707 flight simulators. AMTDU was responsible for developing and disseminating new techniques in air transport operations. It was later moved under the direct control of Headquarters ALG. No. 33 Squadron retired its 707s in June 2008, and subsequently relocated to Amberley under the control of No. 86 Wing.

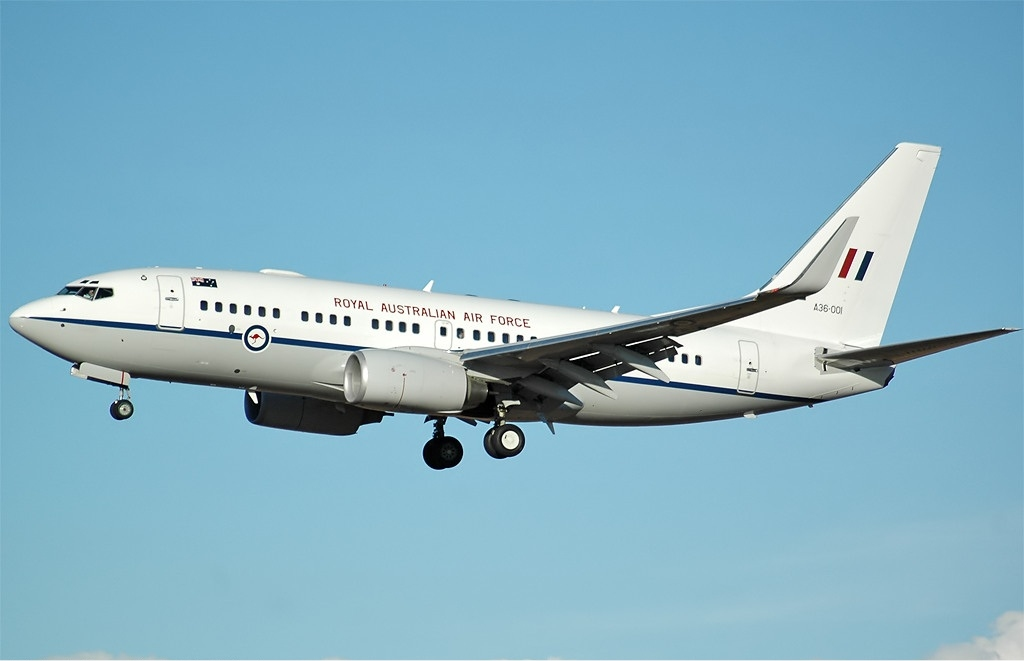
No. 34 Squadron 737 in Canberra, April 2004

No. 37 Squadron transferred from No. 86 Wing to No. 84 Wing in October 2010. It operated a mix of Lockheed C-130H Hercules and Lockheed Martin C-130J Super Hercules, No. 86 Wing having consolidated all its C-130 operations in the one squadron, prior to re-equipping No. 36 Squadron with the Boeing C-17 Globemaster III. The Hercules, along with Globemasters and King Airs, were employed for flood relief in Queensland and Victoria early in 2011. In February, Hercules and Globemasters transported medical staff and equipment to aid victims of the Christchurch earthquake. The same year, No. 34 Squadron provided VIP transport during the visits to Australia by Queen Elizabeth II and US President Barack Obama. No. 37 Squadron's C-130H Hercules were retired in November 2012; the C-130Js are expected to remain in service until about 2030. In February 2013, the RAAF marked ten years rotating a detachment of three C-130s through the Middle East Area of Operations (MEAO) to support the Australian contribution to the wars in Afghanistan and Iraq, a rotation maintained by No. 37 Squadron under the auspices of No. 84 Wing. Its operations having been absorbed by No. 38 Squadron in 2000, No. 35 Squadron was re-established under No. 84 Wing on 14 January 2013, to operate ten Alenia C-27J Spartan tactical transports out of Richmond. The squadron was transferred to the C-27J Transition Team on 21 January 2014, and is expected to return to No. 84 Wing's control upon the Spartan reaching initial operating capability; the first of the new aircraft arrived in Australia on 25 June 2015. On 1 April 2014, ALG was renamed Air Mobility Group. On 13 October 2017, No. 34 Squadron was transferred from No. 84 Wing to No. 86 Wing. This change was made to place the unit under the same headquarters as No. 33 Squadron, whose Airbus KC-30A aircraft are gaining a VIP role.
