= No. 86 Wing RAAF =

- No. 86 Wing's crest
- Active: 1945–64; 1987–current
- Country: Australia
- Branch: Royal Australian Air Force
- Role: Heavy air lift Light transport Air-to-air refuelling
- Part of: Air Mobility Group
- Headquarters: RAAF Base Amberley
- Motto: Precision
- Aircraft: Boeing C-17 Globemaster III; Airbus KC-30; Boeing 737; Bombardier Challenger 604

Commanders
- Notable commanders: Angus Houston (1994–95)

No. 86 Wing is a Royal Australian Air Force (RAAF) transport and air-to-air refuelling wing. Coming under the command of Air Mobility Group, it is headquartered at RAAF Base Amberley in Queensland. The wing comprises No. 33 Squadron operating Airbus KC-30 tanker-transports, No. 34 Squadron operating Boeing 737 Business Jets and Dassault Falcon 7Xs, No. 36 Squadron operating Boeing C-17 Globemaster III heavy transports, and the Australian Army's 68 Ground Liaison Section. Its aircraft support Australian military and humanitarian operations worldwide.

Formed in the last year of World War II to undertake ground attack missions with de Havilland Mosquitos and Bristol Beaufighters in the South West Pacific theatre, No. 86 Wing was reorganised in 1946 as a transport formation headquartered at RAAF Station Schofields, New South Wales, flying Douglas C-47 Dakotas. It relocated to RAAF Base Richmond, New South Wales, in 1949 and began operating Lockheed C-130 Hercules in 1958. Disbanded in 1964, the wing was re-established at Richmond in 1987, flying Boeing 707 tanker-transports as well as the Hercules. No. 36 Squadron converted to Globemasters in 2006. No. 33 Squadron retired its 707s in 2008, and did not become operational with the KC-30 until 2013. The Hercules were transferred to No. 84 Wing in 2010. No. 86 Wing headquarters relocated from Richmond to Amberley in January 2012. In 2017, No. 34 Squadron was transferred from No. 84 Wing to No. 86 Wing.

== History ==
=== Attack formation (1945–46) ===
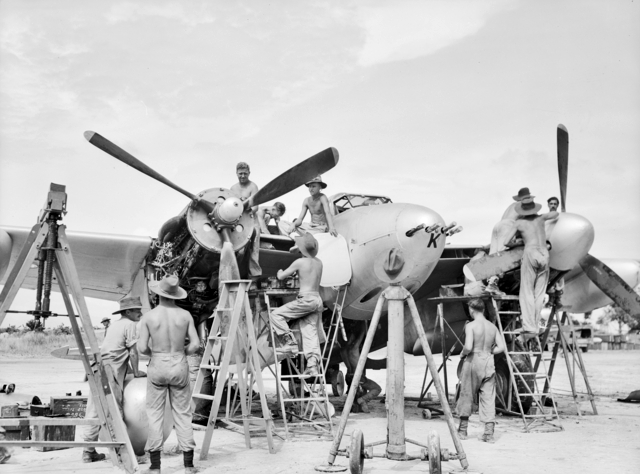
No. 1 Squadron Mosquito, Labuan, August 1945

Established in March 1945 under the command of Group Captain J.M. Whyte, No. 86 (Attack) Wing comprised two flying units, No. 1 Squadron operating de Havilland Mosquitos and No. 93 Squadron operating Bristol Beaufighters. The wing was initially based on the island of Morotai in the South West Pacific theatre, as part of the Australian First Tactical Air Force. Its order of battle for Operation Oboe Six, the assault on north-west Borneo commencing in June, included Nos. 1 and 93 Squadrons, No. 84 Operational Base Unit, No. 30 Air Stores Park, No. 29 Medical Clearing Station, and No. 1 Repair and Servicing Unit—a total of over 1,400 personnel. Delays getting the aircraft operational at their forward base on Labuan meant that the wing only completed three combat missions before the end of the Pacific War, conducting rocket and machine-gun attacks on targets in Sarawak during August 1945. No. 1 Squadron took part in one operation and No. 93 Squadron in two; each unit lost one aircraft in action.

No. 86 Wing was originally to have been augmented by a third combat unit, No. 94 Squadron, flying Mosquitos. Formed in May 1945, the squadron was still undergoing training when the war ended, and it was disbanded at RAAF Station Richmond, New South Wales, in January 1946. In December 1945, shortly after the end of the Pacific War, the commanding officer of No. 93 Squadron, Squadron Leader D.K.M. Gulliver, crashed his Beaufighter on takeoff at Labuan, colliding with two P-51 Mustangs of No. 77 Squadron parked at the airfield; Gulliver and five people on the ground died in the accident, including the then-Officer Commanding No. 86 Wing, Group Captain L.C.M. Holswich. Between January and March 1946, the Beaufighters escorted Mustangs of No. 81 Wing to Japan for service as part of the British Commonwealth Occupation Force. In August that year, Nos. 1 and 93 Squadrons disbanded at Narromine, New South Wales.

=== Initial transport formation (1946–64) ===
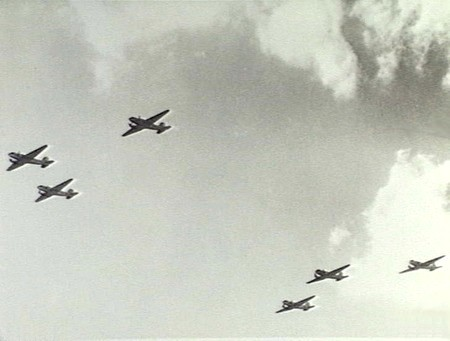
No. 86 Wing Dakotas during a fly-past in 1952

Re-formed at RAAF Station Schofields, New South Wales, in July 1946, No. 86 (Transport) Wing was assigned control of Nos. 36, 37, and 38 Squadrons, flying Douglas C-47 Dakotas. The wing was augmented by No. 386 (Base) Squadron and No. 486 (Maintenance) Squadron, formed in August. The Dakotas initially flew supply missions to the Australian-administered Territory of Papua and New Guinea, as well as three-times weekly courier flights to Japan in support of the British Commonwealth Occupation Force. The latter schedule continued until December 1947, when the service was taken over by Qantas Avro Lancastrians. No. 37 Squadron disbanded in February 1948. In August that year, crews from Nos. 36 and 38 Squadrons departed for Europe to take part in the Berlin Airlift, a commitment that lasted almost a year. The Australians were responsible for delivering over 16 million tons of supplies, and almost 8,000 passengers. No. 386 Squadron disbanded in March 1949 and re-formed as Station Headquarters at Schofields.

On 22 June 1949, No. 86 Wing, comprising Nos. 36, 38 and 486 Squadrons, relocated from Schofields to the nearby RAAF Station Richmond. The return of crews from Berlin allowed the wing to release No. 38 Squadron and its Dakotas to participate in the Malayan Emergency, under the control of No. 90 (Composite) Wing, commencing in June 1950. After airlifting more than 17,000 passengers and evacuating over 300 injured troops, the squadron left Malaya in November 1952 and returned to No. 86 Wing at Richmond. A month earlier, the wing's Dakotas had flown supply and observation flights in connection with the British atomic test on Montebello in Western Australia. No. 36 Squadron disbanded at Richmond on 9 March 1953, re-forming the next day from No. 30 Transport Unit at Iwakuni, Japan. Here it was part of No. 91 (Composite) Wing, which controlled the RAAF's units during the Korean War and its immediate aftermath. The squadron returned to Australia and the aegis of No. 86 Wing two years later, when No. 91 Wing disbanded.

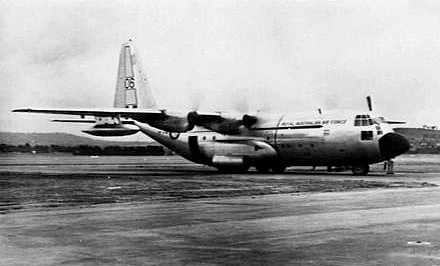
RAAF C-130A Hercules of No. 36 Squadron

In 1954, No. 86 Wing relocated to Canberra to help satisfy the Federal government's VIP transport needs. It returned to Richmond four years later, leaving behind its VIP contingent, No. 34 Flight, which in July 1959 was re-formed as No. 34 Squadron and left the control of No. 86 Wing to become an independent unit directly administered by Home Command and tasked by RAAF Canberra. Having earlier augmented its complement of Dakotas with Convair 440 Metropolitans, in December 1958 the wing began operating Lockheed C-130 Hercules medium transports, when No. 36 Squadron took delivery of the first of twelve C-130As. They remained in service for twenty years, clocking up 147,000 accident-free flying hours.

The official history of the post-war Air Force described the Hercules as "probably the biggest step-up in aircraft capabilities" the RAAF ever received, considering it roughly four times as effective as the Dakota, taking into account the improvements in payload, range, and speed. When No. 78 (Fighter) Wing and its two CAC Sabre squadrons deployed to RAAF Base Butterworth between October 1958 and February 1959, seven Dakotas were required to ferry the staff and equipment of No. 3 Squadron from Australia to Malaya, compared to two Hercules for No. 77 Squadron. In 1962, Air Movements and Training Flight (AMTF), previously under No. 38 Squadron and responsible for developing and imparting new techniques in aerial transport, came directly under the control of No. 86 Wing headquarters. That December, the Hercules carried troops into a combat zone for the first time, when one of No. 36 Squadron's C-130s joined a Commonwealth airlift from Singapore to Borneo at the beginning of the Konfrontasi between Indonesia and Malaysia; similar missions were undertaken for another five years.

No. 38 Squadron received the RAAF's first de Havilland Canada DHC-4 Caribou tactical transports in April 1964, replacing its Dakotas. The first six Caribous were despatched that August to South East Asia for service in the Vietnam War as RAAF Transport Flight Vietnam (RTFV). The same month, No. 86 Wing was disbanded. Because the Caribous were primarily for support of the Australian Army, an overarching wing headquarters for the Caribous and Hercules was now considered inappropriate. No. 486 Squadron was also disbanded and its equipment and staff divided between Nos. 36 and 38 Squadrons, which along with AMTF became independently operating units under the command of Headquarters RAAF Base Richmond. Following the re-establishment at Richmond of No. 37 Squadron in February 1966, flying C-130E Hercules, No. 486 Squadron was re-formed to provide maintenance for both Hercules squadrons. As No. 36 Squadron's tasking was mainly tactical and No. 37 Squadron's strategic (owing to the longer range of its C-130Es), forming the Hercules units into a new wing was not deemed necessary. Still based at Richmond, the Hercules provided long-range transport and medical evacuation services to and from South East Asia during the Vietnam War. No. 36 Squadron's C-130As were replaced by C-130H models in 1978. RTFV was re-formed as No. 35 Squadron in June 1966, and continued to serve in Vietnam until Australian forces were withdrawn in 1972; it was then based in Richmond until 1976, when it relocated to RAAF Base Townsville, Queensland. No. 38 Squadron meanwhile continued to operate Caribous out of Richmond until 1992, when it transferred to RAAF Base Amberley, Queensland. In the Vietnam and post-Vietnam eras, along with their military transport duties, the Hercules and Caribou undertook disaster relief operations throughout Australia and the Pacific.

=== Current transport formation (1987–) ===
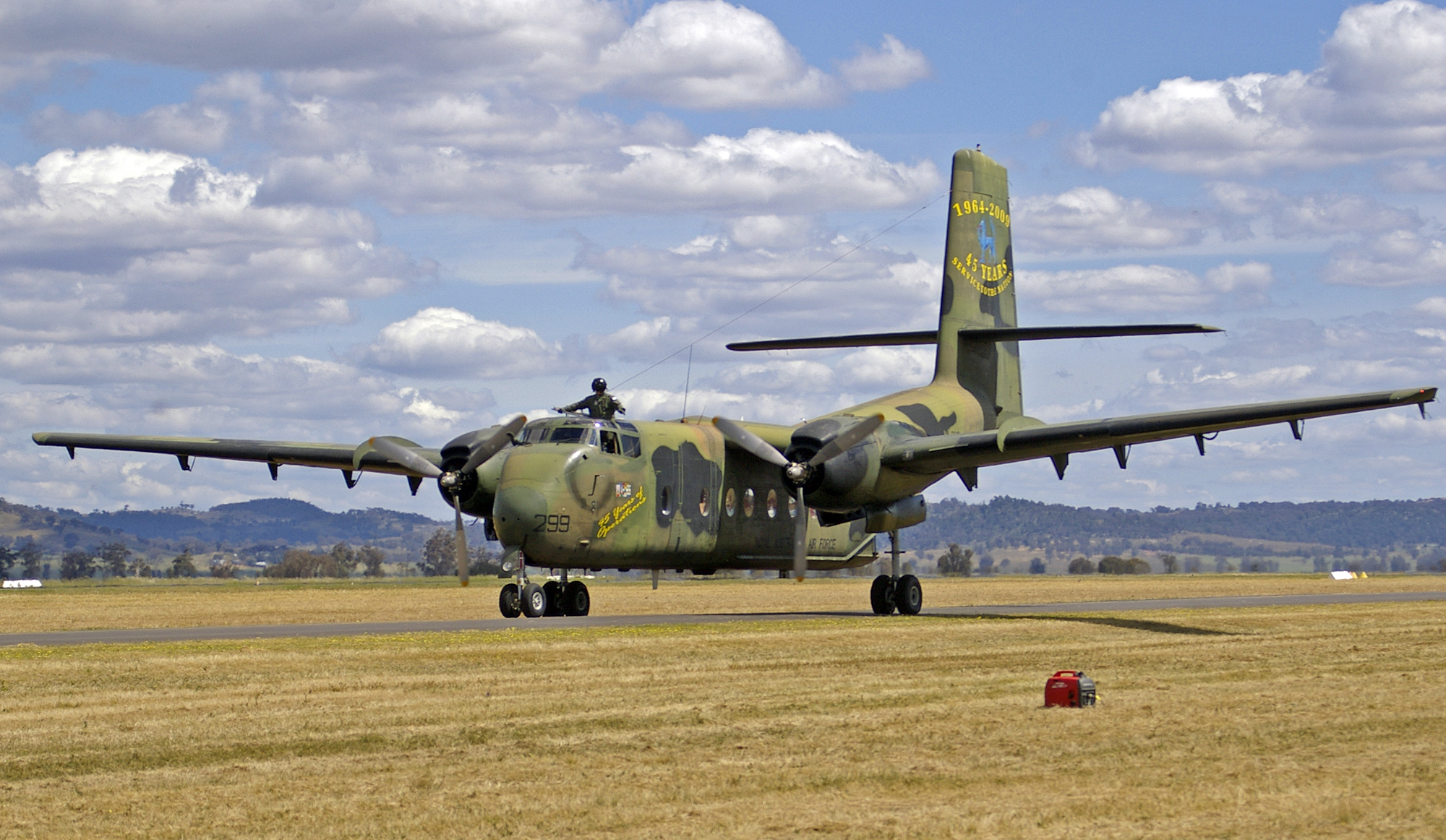
RAAF DHC-4 Caribou, October 2009

No. 86 Wing re-formed at Richmond on 2 February 1987, under the newly established Air Lift Group (ALG), which replaced Headquarters RAAF Base Richmond. Commanded by Group Captain G.I. Lumsden, the wing's flying units consisted of No. 33 Squadron, operating Boeing 707 tanker-transports, and Nos. 36 and 37 Squadrons, operating C-130H and C-130E Hercules, respectively; No. 486 Maintenance Squadron and Air Movements Training and Development Unit (AMTDU), which had evolved from AMTF in 1965, were also under its control. No. 486 Squadron was responsible for day-to-day maintenance of the 707s as well as the Hercules. No. 34 Squadron, the VIP transport unit based at RAAF Base Fairbairn in Canberra, and No. 32 Squadron, flying Hawker Siddeley HS 748 air navigation trainers at RAAF Base East Sale in Victoria, became part of No. 86 Wing in June 1988 and July 1989, respectively. In 1992, the Hercules of Nos. 36 and 37 Squadrons clocked up a grand total of 500,000 accident-free flying hours; Lockheed presented No. 86 Wing with a trophy to commemorate the milestone. During 1994–95, the wing was commanded by Group Captain (later Air Chief Marshal) Angus Houston, who in 2005 was appointed Chief of the Defence Force, only the third RAAF officer to be raised to the top position in the Australian armed services.

By mid-1996, No. 32 Squadron had been transferred to No. 84 Wing, which was also controlled by ALG. In 1998, No. 86 Wing received the Duke of Gloucester Cup as the most proficient wing in RAAF Air Command. No. 486 Squadron was disbanded in October that year, after transferring its functions to Nos. 36 and 37 Squadrons. By then, Nos. 35 and 38 Squadrons, flying Caribous out of RAAF Bases Townsville and Amberley, respectively, had joined the Hercules squadrons and AMTDU under the aegis of No. 86 Wing, while Nos. 33 and 34 Squadrons had been transferred to No. 84 Wing, now also headquartered at Richmond. Later, AMTDU became part of No. 85 Wing at Richmond. No. 37 Squadron's C-130Es were replaced by C-130J models in 1999. No. 35 Squadron transferred its Caribous to No. 38 Squadron in 2000, and was "formally deactivated" in March 2002. RAAF C-130 operations were concentrated in No. 37 Squadron in November 2006, when No. 36 Squadron transferred its C-130Hs prior to re-equipping with the Boeing C-17 Globemaster III heavy transports and relocating to Amberley. No. 38 Squadron's Caribous were retired at the end of 2009, and replaced by Beech King Air 350 light transports. No. 37 Squadron was transferred to No. 84 Wing in October 2010.

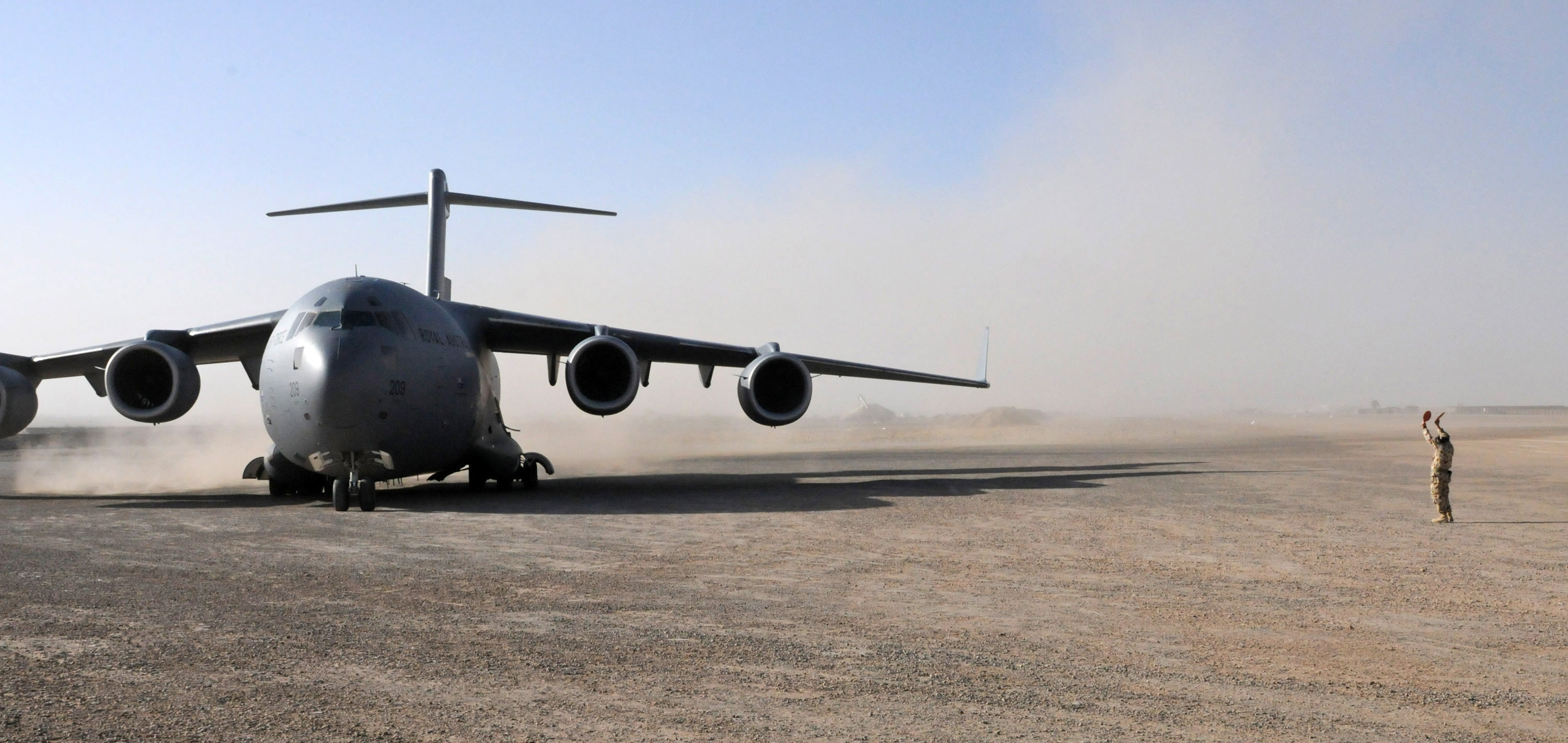
RAAF C-17 Globemaster taxiing at Tarin Kowt airfield in Afghanistan, December 2010

The aircraft operated by No. 86 Wing became well known to the general public through their involvement in disaster relief and emergency transport in Australia and the region, along with their participation in overseas peacekeeping efforts. Hercules and 707s were employed by the Federal government to provide air transport during the pilots' dispute that curtailed operations by the two domestic airlines in 1989, evacuated Australian nationals from the Middle East during the first Gulf War in 1990–91, and transported Australian troops to and from Somalia as part of Operation Solace in 1993. Since the end of the Vietnam War, much of the RAAF's transport tasking had been relatively routine in nature, or involved humanitarian relief; the Somalia operation marked the beginning of a shift for No. 86 Wing towards a more combat-ready or "operational" focus. Six Hercules evacuated over 450 civilians from Cambodia following the coup in July 1997. Two detachments from the wing, one of Hercules and one of Caribous, supported INTERFET operations in East Timor between September 1999 and February 2001. Wing operations staff accompanied Hercules of Nos. 36 and 37 Squadrons on relief efforts following the Bali Bombings in October 2002.

In February 2003, a rotating detachment of three Hercules deployed to the Persian Gulf to support the Australian contribution to the wars in Afghanistan and Iraq; over the next seven years they amassed 20,000 operational flying hours. From July 2003 to July 2004, Caribous undertook reconnaissance and transport missions during the Solomon Islands intervention. No. 36 Squadron Hercules took part in Operation Sumatra Assist in the wake of the 2004 Boxing Day tsunami. The RAAF's contribution to Operation Papua New Guinea Assist, following Cyclone Guba in November 2007, included a Globemaster, two Hercules, and three Caribous. In September 2008, a Globemaster undertook the type's first aeromedical evacuation in RAAF service, transporting five injured Australian troops to Amberley from Tarin Kowt in Afghanistan. Globemasters, Hercules and King Airs were all employed for flood relief in Queensland and Victoria early in 2011. In February that year, Globemasters and Hercules transported medical staff and equipment to New Zealand to aid victims of the Christchurch earthquake. The following month, a Globemaster flew 23 sorties in Japan supporting relief efforts after the Tōhoku earthquake and tsunami, while two other Globemasters delivered a water cannon to help contain damage at the Fukushima Daiichi Nuclear Power Plant.

On 1 January 2012, No. 86 Wing headquarters relocated from Richmond to Amberley. ALG was renamed Air Mobility Group on 1 April 2014. By the end of 2015, No. 86 Wing's complement was: No. 33 Squadron, which became operational with the Airbus KC-30 tanker-transport after receiving the fourth of its aircraft in March 2013; No. 36 Squadron, which took delivery of its eight and last Globemaster in November 2015; No. 38 Squadron, operating King Airs; and the Australian Army's 68 Ground Liaison Section. All units were based at Amberley, with the exception of No. 38 Squadron, located at Townsville. On 13 October 2017, No. 34 Squadron was transferred from No. 84 Wing to No. 86 Wing. The Governor-General, David Hurley, presented No. 86 Wing with the Queen's Squadron Standard at Amberley on 21 November 2019 to recognise twenty-five years of service.
