= No. 37 Squadron RAAF =

Royal Australian Air Force transport squadron

- No. 37 Squadron's crest
- Active: 1943–1948; 1966–current
- Allegiance: Australia
- Branch: Royal Australian Air Force
- Role: Medium tactical airlift
- Part of: No. 86 Wing (1946–1948, 1987–2010); No. 84 Wing (2010–current)
- Garrison/HQ: RAAF Base Richmond
- Motto: "Foremost"
- Engagements: World War II; Vietnam War; Operation Solace; Operation Warden; War in Afghanistan; 2003 invasion of Iraq; War against the Islamic State

Commanders
- Current commander: Wing Commander Dianne Bell
- Notable commanders: Darren Goldie (2012–2015)

Aircraft flown
- Transport: C-60 Lodestar (1943–1945); C-47 Dakota (1945–1948); C-130E Hercules (1966–2000); C-130H Hercules (2006–2012); C-130J Hercules (1999–current)

No. 37 Squadron is a Royal Australian Air Force (RAAF) medium tactical airlift squadron. It operates Lockheed Martin C-130J Hercules aircraft from RAAF Base Richmond, New South Wales. The squadron has seen active service flying transport aircraft during World War II, the Vietnam War, the wars in Afghanistan and Iraq, and the military intervention against ISIL. It has also supported Australian humanitarian and peacekeeping operations around the world, including in Somalia, East Timor, Bali, Papua New Guinea, and the Philippines.

The squadron was formed at RAAF Station Laverton, Victoria, in July 1943, and equipped with Lockheed C-60 Lodestars that it operated in Australia, New Guinea and the Dutch East Indies. Towards the end of the war it began flying Douglas C-47 Dakotas. It became part of No. 86 (Transport) Wing, headquartered at RAAF Station Schofields, New South Wales, in 1946 but was disbanded two years later. In response to Australia's increasing air transport needs during the Vietnam War, the squadron was re-formed at Richmond in February 1966, and equipped with the C-130E Hercules. It began converting to the C-130J model in 1999, and between 2006 and 2012 also operated C-130Hs formerly of No. 36 Squadron. No. 37 Squadron came under the control of a re-formed No. 86 Wing from 1987 until 2010, when it was transferred to No. 84 Wing.

== Role and equipment ==
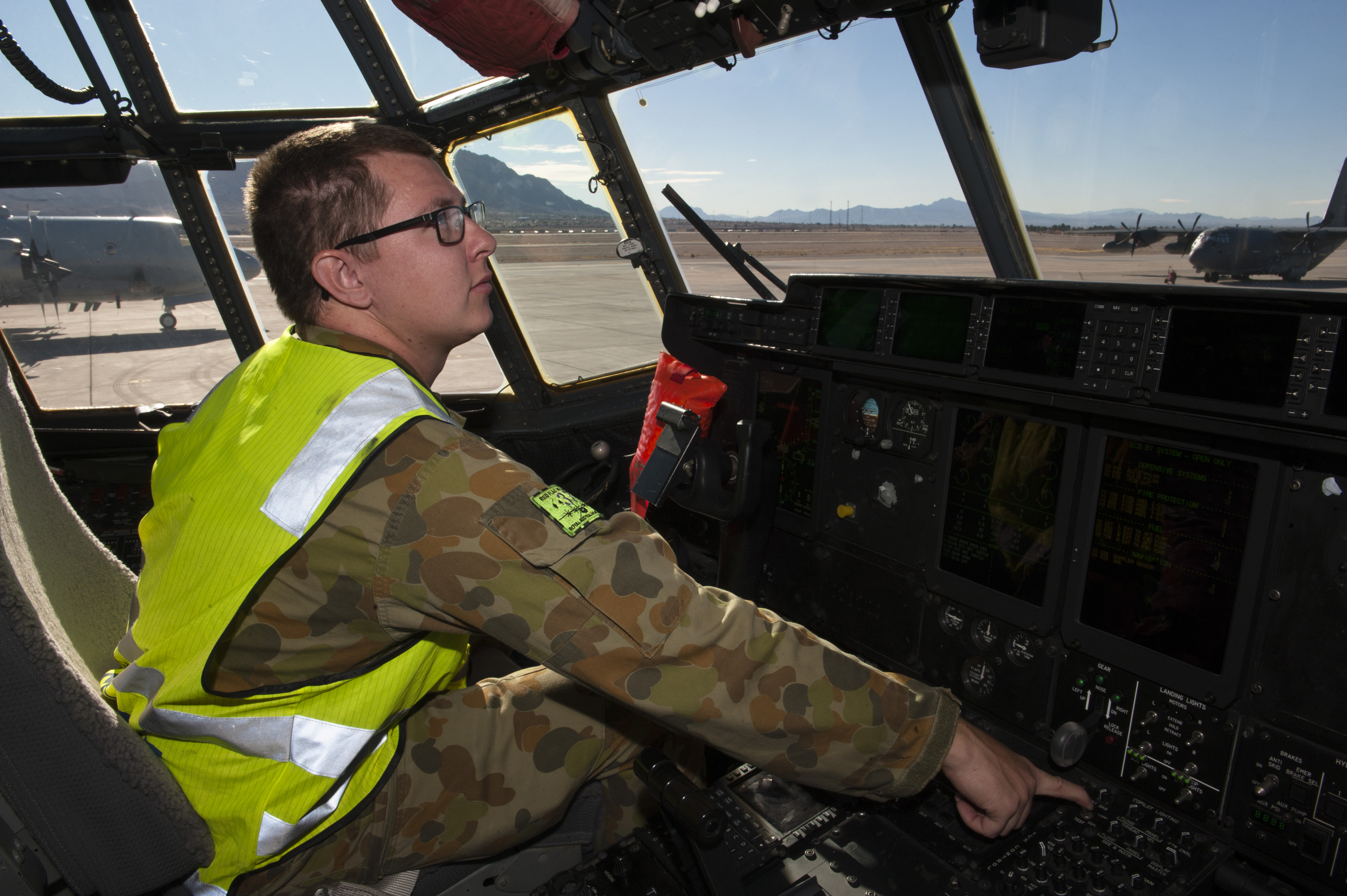
Ground crewman of No. 37 Squadron in a C-130J Hercules during a US exercise in February 2015

No. 37 Squadron is tasked with medium tactical airlift in Australia and overseas, transporting troops and cargo, and conducting medical evacuation, search-and-rescue, and airdrop missions. It is located at RAAF Base Richmond, New South Wales, and controlled by No. 84 Wing, which is part of Air Mobility Group. As of July 2013, the squadron comprised more than 400 personnel organised into four flights of aircrew, an administrative and operational section, and a maintenance section responsible for day-to-day aircraft servicing as well as regular maintenance cycles of six weeks' duration. Intermediate and heavy maintenance is contracted to Airbus Group Australia Pacific (airframe) and StandardAero (engines). No. 37 Squadron's motto is "Foremost".

The squadron operates twelve Lockheed Martin C-130J Hercules, which entered service in 1999. The aircraft are generally crewed by two pilots and a loadmaster, the latter being responsible for the loading, carriage and unloading of cargo and passengers. The C-130J can carry 19,500 kilograms (43,000 lb) of cargo, or 120 passengers. It has a range of over 6,800 km (4,200 miles) without payload, and is able to operate from short and unsealed airstrips. From 1999 to 2017, No. 285 Squadron operated a C-130J flight simulator at Richmond to train No. 37 Squadron's aircrew and maintenance personnel; its role and most of its personnel were subsequently transferred to No. 37 Squadron's Training Flight. No. 37 Squadron maintains a detachment of two aircraft at Al Minhad Air Base in the United Arab Emirates to support operations in the Middle East Region under Operation Accordion. The C-130Js are expected to remain in RAAF service until 2030.

== History ==
=== World War II and aftermath ===
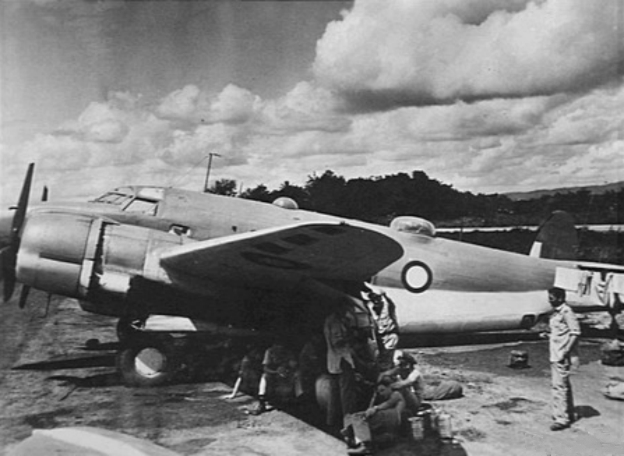
Lockheed Lodestar of No. 37 Squadron at Merauke, Dutch New Guinea, in December 1944

No. 37 (Transport) Squadron was formed on 15 July 1943 at RAAF Station Laverton, Victoria, with a staff of two officers and thirteen airmen. Its first commanding officer, Squadron Leader Neville Hemsworth (late of No. 34 Squadron), arrived on 21 July, and its first aircraft, a single-engined Northrop Delta (also formerly of No. 34 Squadron), was delivered on 2 August. The squadron was allocated the first of a batch of ten twin-engined Lockheed C-60 Lodestar transports on 23 August. The Delta was written off following an accident on 30 September. By then the squadron's staff numbered 190, including forty-five officers. It was declared operational on 11 October 1943, undertaking regular courier flights across Australia to destinations including Perth, Western Australia; Darwin and Alice Springs, Northern Territory; Adelaide, South Australia; Maryborough, Queensland; and Launceston, Tasmania.

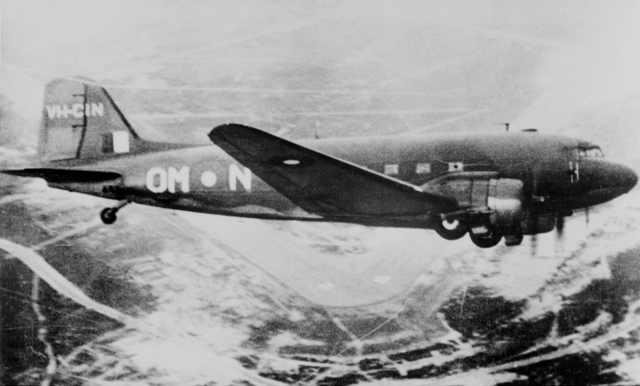
Douglas Dakota A65-71 of No. 37 Squadron that flew the late Prime Minister John Curtin to burial in July 1945

By mid-1944, the squadron had expanded its operations to New Guinea, making courier flights to Merauke initially, and later Wewak, Noemfoor and Hollandia. It transferred to Essendon, Victoria, on 1 September. The unit was now one of eight Australian transport squadrons, all of which operated under the control of RAAF Headquarters, Melbourne. Their primary duty was supporting the Australian military, though they could also be released for urgent requests by General Douglas MacArthur's South West Pacific Area headquarters. A Lodestar crashed and burned on takeoff at Merauke on 26 January 1945 but all aboard escaped injury; it was the only hull loss suffered by the type in Australian service. No. 37 Squadron received its first three Douglas C-47 Dakotas the following month, and by the end of March had a complement of eighteen aircraft: nine Dakotas, seven Lodestars, a Douglas DC-2, and a de Havilland Tiger Moth. The next month it began operating detachments out of Parafield, South Australia, and Morotai in the Dutch East Indies. On 6 July 1945, one of the squadron's Dakotas transported the body of Prime Minister John Curtin from Canberra to Perth for burial. By September 1945, No. 37 Squadron's strength was 357 staff, including 111 officers, sixteen Dakotas, two Lodestars, a DC-2, and a Tiger Moth.

Following the end of hostilities, No. 37 Squadron repatriated former prisoners of war from Singapore to Australia. On 27 July 1946, it moved to RAAF Station Schofields, New South Wales, where it came under the control of No. 86 (Transport) Wing along with Nos. 36 and 38 Squadrons, also operating Dakotas. Another unit of No. 86 Wing, No. 486 (Maintenance) Squadron, was responsible for servicing the Dakotas. On 30 September 1946, No. 37 Squadron was assigned the regular courier service to Japan that had previously been flown by No. 36 Squadron, to support the British Commonwealth Occupation Force. In January 1947, No. 37 Squadron handed over the Japan courier run to No. 38 Squadron, and the following month took over the Lae courier service previously flown by No. 36 Squadron; the Rabaul courier run was added in April. By the end of 1947, No. 37 Squadron's personnel numbered fifty-six, including twenty-four officers, and it had an average of ten Dakotas on strength. The unit was disbanded at Schofields on 24 February 1948.

=== Re-establishment ===
On 27 September 1965, Minister for Air Peter Howson announced that No. 37 Squadron was to be re-raised to operate twelve Lockheed C-130E Hercules transport aircraft that had been purchased by the Federal government; the new aircraft would allow the RAAF to support Australian deployments in South East Asia while continuing to meet its domestic commitments. The squadron was formed at RAAF Base Richmond on 21 February 1966, under the command of Wing Commander Ron McKimm. It joined No. 36 Squadron, which had been operating C-130A Hercules since 1958. No. 486 Squadron, disbanded in 1964, was re-formed at Richmond to provide maintenance for both Hercules squadrons; major repairs and upgrades to the C-130s were the responsibility of No. 2 Aircraft Depot (later No. 503 Wing). As the C-130E had a longer range and could carry a greater payload than the C-130A, No. 37 Squadron was generally assigned strategic tasks, while No. 36 Squadron's responsibilities were primarily tactical in nature. No. 37 Squadron began taking delivery of its C-130Es in August, and by the end of September its staff numbered eighty-six, including twenty-one officers. In February 1967, the squadron commenced long-range missions in support of Australian forces in the Vietnam War, including aero-medical evacuations conveying wounded soldiers back to Australia, generally via RAAF Base Butterworth, Malaysia. Initially both C-130A and E models were employed for such evacuations, but only C-130Es were assigned to this task from May 1967, as they offered more comfortable conditions and were capable of flying directly between South Vietnam and Australia if required. By the end of February 1968, No. 37 Squadron had a strength of 207 personnel: eighty-five aircrew, including fifty-one officers, and 122 ground staff, including three officers. The squadron transported the last Australian forces out of Vietnam in December 1972, following the Federal government's decision to withdraw from the conflict.

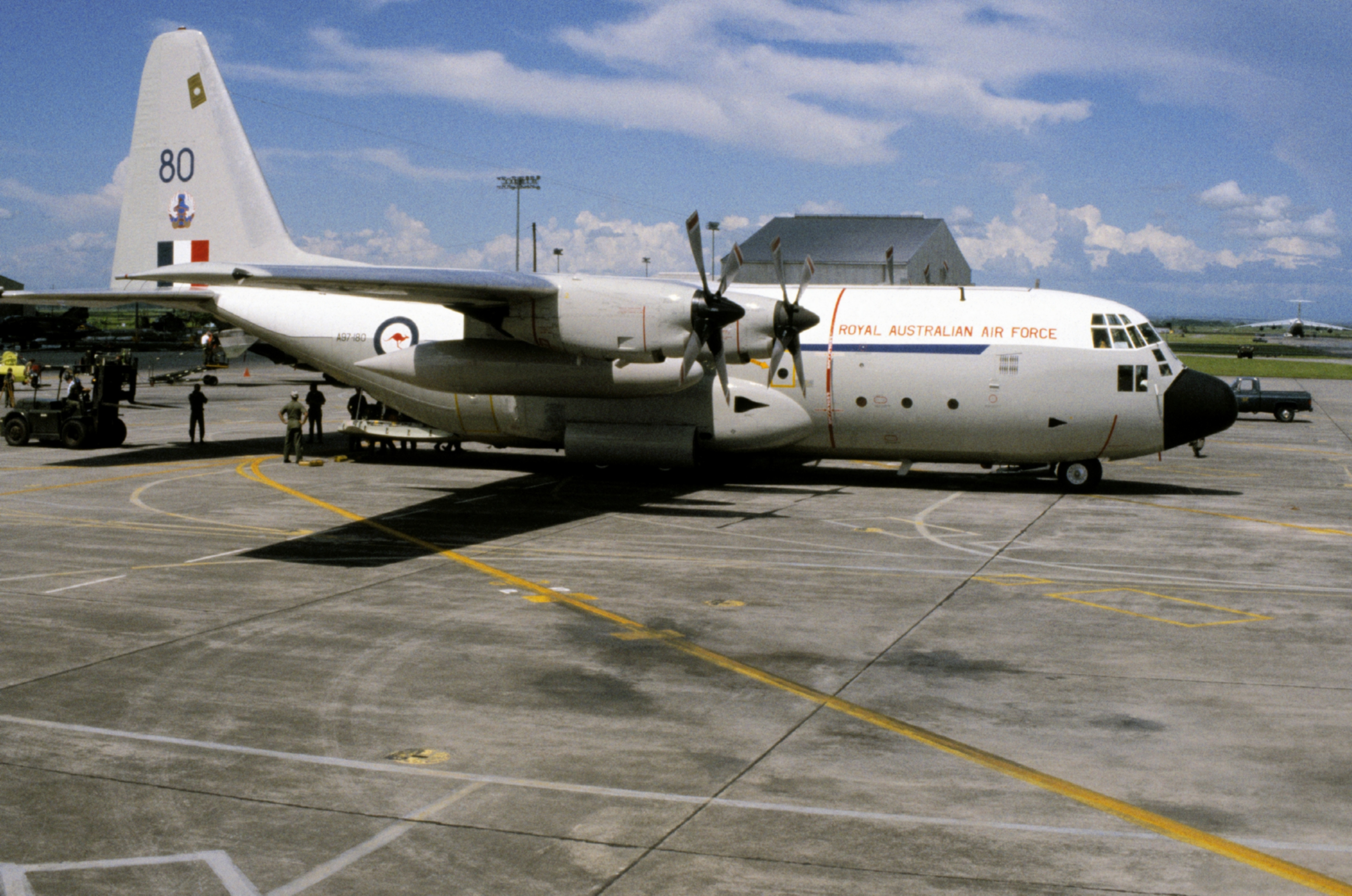
C-130E Hercules of No. 37 Squadron at Clark Air Base, Philippines, in November 1981

As well as participating in military exercises and overseas peacekeeping commitments, the Hercules became a familiar sight in the Southern Pacific, called on for relief operations following many natural disasters including tsunamis in New Guinea, cyclones in the Solomons and Tonga, and fires and floods throughout Australia. It played a major role in the evacuation of civilians following Cyclone Tracy in Darwin in 1974–75; a No. 37 Squadron C-130E was the first aircraft to touch down in Darwin following the disaster. The squadron contributed eleven aircraft to the relief effort, carrying 4,400 passengers and 1,300,000 pounds (590,000 kg) of cargo. No. 37 Squadron aircraft took part in Operation Babylift, the US-led effort to evacuate the orphaned children of American servicemen from Vietnam in April 1975. Later that month, two of the squadron's aircraft were assigned to the United Nations (UN) to transport supplies throughout South East Asia; the C-130s' Australian roundels were painted over with UN symbols to signify the mission's neutrality. Commencing operations in May, the aircraft flew supplies into Laos and transported cargo between Thailand, Butterworth, Hong Kong and Singapore, completing ninety-one sorties by the time the mission ended in early June. The Hercules also evacuated Australian embassy personnel from Saigon, South Vietnam, and Phnom Penh, Cambodia, following the end of the Vietnam War. No. 37 Squadron was awarded the Gloucester Cup by the Governor General in June 1976 for its performance in 1974–75.

In January–February 1979, two No. 37 Squadron C-130Es evacuated Australian and other foreign embassy staff from Tehran, shortly before the collapse of royal rule during the Iranian Revolution. The same year, the squadron began operations with two ex-Qantas Boeing 707s, handing them over to No. 33 Flight (later No. 33 Squadron) at the beginning of 1981. No. 37 Squadron transported the Popemobiles on John Paul II's 1986 tour of Australia; its other unusual cargoes have included a stud bull presented to the Chinese government, kangaroos and sheep to Malaysia, and an exhibition of China's Entombed Warriors. In February 1987, the unit again joined No. 36 Squadron, along with No. 33 Squadron, as part of a re-formed No. 86 Wing under the newly established Air Lift Group (later Air Mobility Group). The following year, No. 37 Squadron achieved 200,000 accident-free flying hours on the Hercules. The Australian public had the experience of flying in the C-130s when the aircraft were employed by the Federal government to provide transport during the 1989 Australian pilots' dispute that curtailed operations by the two domestic airlines. In December 1990 and January 1991, a detachment of C-130s from Nos. 36 and 37 Squadrons flew missions to Dubai in support of Australia's naval contribution to the Gulf War. No. 37 Squadron transported Australian troops to Somalia as part of Operation Solace in January 1993, and provided a shuttle service between Kenya and Somalia during May. No. 486 Squadron was disbanded in October 1998, having transferred its C-130 maintenance functions to Nos. 36 and 37 Squadrons. No. 37 Squadron began re-equipping with new-model C-130J Hercules in September 1999. Its aircraft formed part of a detachment of C-130s supporting INTERFET forces in East Timor between September 1999 and February 2000, under Operation Warden. The last C-130Es were taken out of service in November 2000. No. 37 Squadron was awarded the Gloucester Cup in 2001, the same year it took delivery of its twelfth and final C-130J. Five C-130s of Nos. 36 and 37 Squadrons participated in relief efforts following the Bali bombings in October 2002.

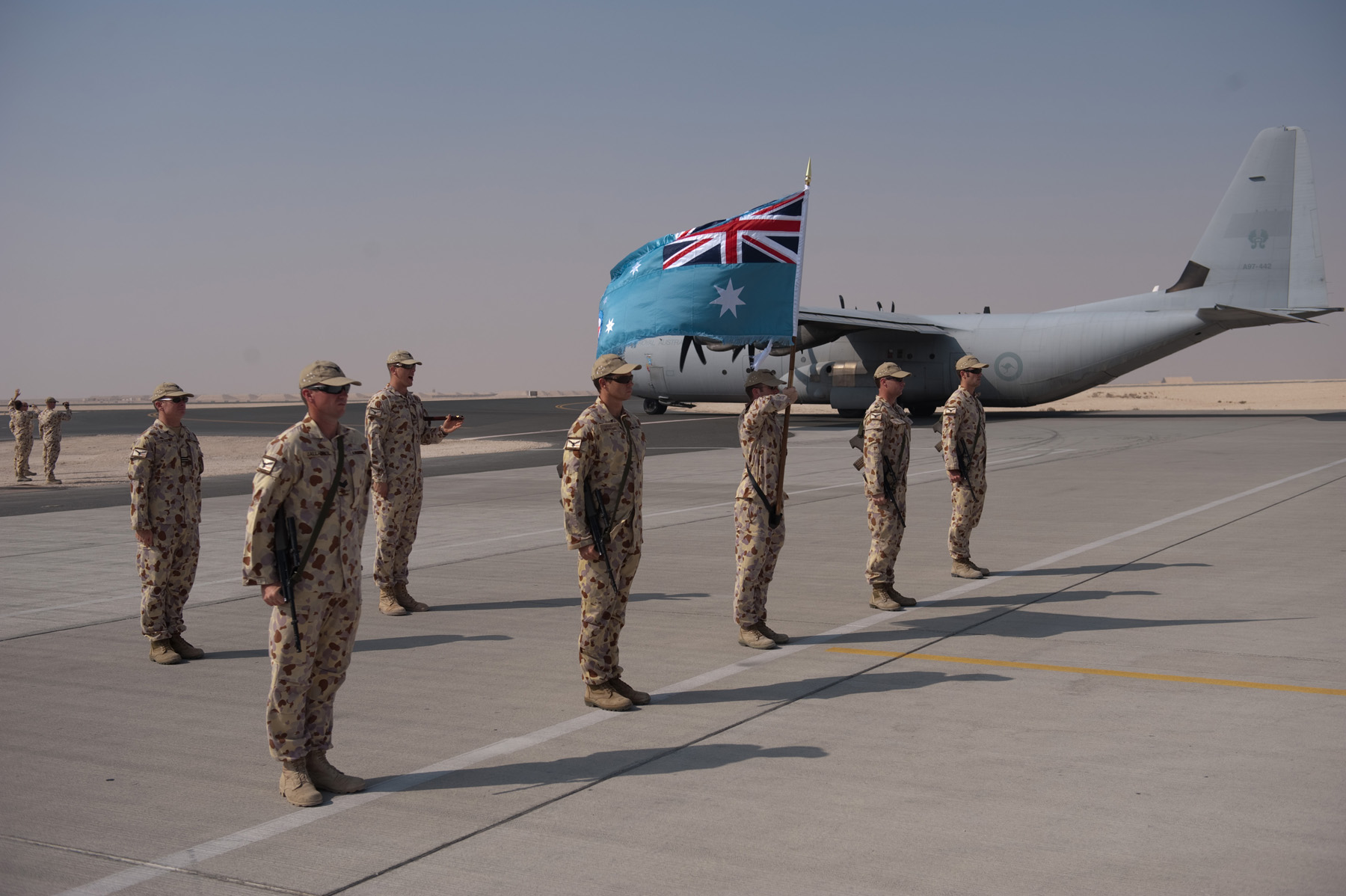
C-130J Hercules and personnel of No. 37 Squadron in the Middle East during 2009

In September 2004, aircraft from No. 37 Squadron joined the rotating detachment of C-130s established by No. 36 Squadron in the Middle East Area of Operations (MEAO) in February 2003, following the invasion of Iraq; the C-130Js were required to be fitted with self-protection equipment before deploying to the MEAO. No. 37 Squadron was strengthened to create a "super squadron" on 17 November 2006, when its force of twelve C-130Js was augmented by No. 36 Squadron's twelve C-130Hs, prior to the latter re-equipping with Boeing C-17 Globemasters and relocating to RAAF Base Amberley, Queensland. Two of the C-130s joined DHC-4 Caribous from No. 38 Squadron as part of the RAAF's initial contribution to Operation Papua New Guinea Assist following Cyclone Guba in November 2007. No. 37 Squadron took over full responsibility for the Hercules detachment to the MEAO in mid-2008, and in March 2010 one of its C-130Js completed the detachment's 20,000th hour of flying operations. The squadron was transferred from No. 86 Wing to No. 84 Wing on 1 October 2010, as part of a restructure of Air Lift Group. It was presented with the Gloucester Cup for its proficiency in 2011 at a ceremony on 31 May 2012. The C-130Hs were retired the same year, the last pair at Richmond on 30 November. In January 2013, No. 37 Squadron undertook a successful search-and-rescue mission for Alain Delord, a missing round-the-world yachtsman who was found approximately 500 nautical miles (930 km) south of Tasmania. Crews located Delord adrift in a life raft before airdropping supplies, maintaining watch and ultimately guiding in a rescue vessel fifty-eight hours later.

No. 37 Squadron was awarded the Gloucester Cup for proficiency in March 2013. It celebrated its 70th anniversary on 17 July, undertaking a two-ship flight over Sydney and the Blue Mountains. That November, the squadron deployed to the Philippines to participate in humanitarian relief operations in the wake of Typhoon Haiyan. In August 2014, aircraft from No. 37 Squadron based in the Middle East were involved in the airdrop of humanitarian supplies to civilians in Iraq following an offensive by Islamic State forces. The first drop occurred on the night of 13/14 August, when one of the squadron's C-130Js took part in a 16-aircraft mission including US C-17s and C-130Hs and a British C-130J that delivered supplies to Yezidi civilians trapped on Mount Sinjar. According to the Australian Department of Defence, it was the RAAF's "most complex operational humanitarian air drop mission in more than a decade". A second drop was conducted to deliver supplies to isolated civilians in the northern Iraqi town of Amirli. By September 2014, the RAAF's C-130Js had accumulated over 100,000 flying hours. Later that month, a C-130J took part in the airlift of arms and munitions to forces in Kurdish-controlled northern Iraq; the involvement of RAAF transport aircraft in operations in Iraq is ongoing. From 7 to 10 December 2015, a C-130J of No. 37 Squadron flying out of Guam joined American and Japanese aircraft in Operation Christmas Drop, a humanitarian aerial supply operation in the west Pacific and Micronesia. No. 37 Squadron was awarded the Meritorious Unit Citation in the Queen's Birthday Honours on 13 June 2016 for "sustained outstanding service in warlike operations throughout the Middle East Area of Operations over the period January 2002 to June 2014". The squadron commemorated sixty years of RAAF Hercules operations in December 2018, and twenty years of C-130J operations in September 2019. One of the C-130s flew from Australia to Antarctica in February 2020, the first time a RAAF Hercules had done so since 1983, to provide equipment for the Australian Antarctic Division near Casey Station. The squadron was awarded the RAAF Maintenance Trophy in April 2023. On 8 September 2024, the Squadron carried Pope Francis and a Papal delegation on a mission in Papua New Guinea.

== See also ==
- Lockheed C-130 Hercules in Australian service
