= Meritorious Unit Citation =

- Left: insignia worn if a member of the unit when earned Right: insignia worn if joined after
- Type: Unit Citation
- Awarded for: sustained outstanding service in warlike operations
- Presented by: Australia
- Eligibility: Australian military units
- Status: Currently awarded
- Established: 15 January 1991
- First award: 4 November 1991
- Final award: 2023 Special Honours

Highlights
- Total: 31
- Total recipients: See Recipients section below
- Award streamer
- Related: Commendation for Distinguished Service

The Meritorious Unit Citation is a collective group decoration awarded to members of Australian military units. It recognises sustained outstanding service in warlike operations. The Meritorious Unit Citation was created in 1991, along with the Unit Citation for Gallantry.

== Description ==
The insignia of a Meritorious Unit Citation is a rhodium plated sterling silver frame measuring 32 by 15 millimetres (1.26 in × 0.59 in), with a design of flames emanating from the edge to the centre. The frame surrounds a ribbon bar of old gold, which may display a rhodium plated, 7-millimetre (0.28 in) diameter, sterling silver Federation Star on its centre.

Members attached to the unit when the citation is awarded wear it with the Federation Star, and continue to wear this after leaving the unit. Members who subsequently join the unit wear the citation without the Federation Star, and discontinue wearing it after leaving the unit.

== Recipients ==
- HMAS Brisbane – 4 November 1991
  - For meritorious operational service in the Persian Gulf during enforcement of sanctions in support of United Nations Security Council Resolutions and the subsequent period of hostilities against Iraq to liberate Kuwait in 1990–91.
- HMAS Sydney – 4 November 1991
  - For meritorious operational service in the Persian Gulf during enforcement of sanctions in support of United Nations Security Council Resolutions and the subsequent period of hostilities against Iraq to liberate Kuwait in 1990–91.
- Clearance Diving Team 3 – 4 November 1991
  - For meritorious service in clearing Kuwaiti ports of mines, explosive devices and ordnance during the period 27 January to 11 May 1991.
- 3 Squadron, Special Air Service Regiment – 25 March 2000
  - For sustained outstanding service in warlike operations of the Special Air Service Regiment of the Response Force for Operation Warden.
- No. 2 Airfield Defence Squadron – 25 March 2000
  - For sustained outstanding service in warlike operations in support of the International Force for East Timor on Operations Operation Warden and Operation Stabilise.
- Task Group 645.1.1 – 25 March 2000
  - For sustained outstanding service in warlike operations in support of the International Force for East Timor during Operation Stabilise.
- 10th Force Support Battalion – 26 January 2002
  - For sustained outstanding service in the provision of logistic support to warlike operations in East Timor.
- No. 84 Wing Detachment Manas – 29 September 2002
  - For outstanding service during warlike operations over the Afghanistan area of operation from March to September 2002 during Operation Slipper.
- No. 3 Squadron RNZAF – 15 November 2002
  - For sustained outstanding service in the support of the peacekeeping operations whilst deployed in East Timor.
- Special Air Service Regiment – 19 December 2002
  - For sustained outstanding service in warlike operations in Afghanistan in support of the International Coalition against Terrorism.
- HMAS Anzac – 27 November 2003
  - For sustained outstanding service in warlike operations in the Middle East Area of Operations between February and May 2003 whilst deployed on Operation Falconer.
- HMAS Kanimbla – 27 November 2003
  - For meritorious service in warlike operations in the war against weapons of mass destruction, Iraq, during Operation Bastille and Operation Falconer between February and May 2003.
- Clearance Diving Team 3 – 27 November 2003
  - For sustained outstanding service in warlike conditions during Operation Bastille and Operation Falconer against Iraq between February and May 2003.
- No. 75 Squadron RAAF – 27 November 2003
  - For sustained outstanding service during warlike operations, in the Middle East Area of operations, over Iraq during Operation Falconer.
- No. 1 Combat Communications Squadron – 27 November 2003
  - For sustained outstanding service in warlike operations in providing expeditionary communication and information systems support during Operations Bastille and Operation Falconer.
- Task Group 633.4.2 – 14 September 2004
  - For sustained outstanding service in warlike operations in providing air traffic control at Baghdad International Airport during Operation Falconer and Operation Catalyst.
- Australian Medical Detachment (Balad) – 12 June 2006
  - For meritorious service and outstanding professional competency in the provision of health care in support of the United States Air Force Theatre Hospital, Balad, Iraq during Operation Catalyst between 4 May 2005 and 28 September 2005.
- HMAS Parramatta – 26 January 2007
  - For meritorious operational service in the Northern Arabian Gulf during Operation Catalyst from 1 November 2005 to 25 March 2006 while conducting maritime security operations in support of the Australian Government's contribution to the rehabilitation and rebuilding of Iraq.
- Australian Medical Detachment (Balad) – 26 January 2007
  - For sustained outstanding service and professional competency in the provision of health care in support of the United States Air Force Theatre Hospital, Balad, Iraq during Operation Catalyst from 1 September 2004 to 3 May 2005 inclusive and from 29 September 2005 to 31 December 2005 inclusive.
- 5th Aviation Regiment – 27 November 2007
  - For sustained meritorious service during warlike and peace support missions in support of Operation Warden, Operation Tanager and Operation Slipper.
- Mentoring Task Force-1 – 13 June 2011
  - For sustained outstanding service in warlike operations on Operation Slipper in Uruzgan Province, Afghanistan, between 20 January and 30 October 2010.
- 92 Wing RAAF – 11 Jul 2013
  - For sustained outstanding service in warlike operations on Operation Falconer, Operation Catalyst and Operation Slipper from 2003 to 2012.
- Force Communications Unit, Australian Defence Force – 26 January 2014
  - For sustained outstanding service in warlike operations through the provision of communications support to the United Nations Transitional Authority in Cambodia from 15 March 1992 to 7 October 1993.
- 1st Joint Movement Group – 26 January 2015
  - For sustained and outstanding warlike operational service in the Middle East Area of Operations over the period November 2001 to June 2014.
  - The 1st Joint Movement Group was continuously deployed for 13 years and provided sustained and outstanding service to the Australian Defence Force and supporting Australian government agencies by successfully enabling the force projection, sustainment and re-deployment of all force elements to and from the Middle East as part of Operations FALCONER, BASTILLE, CATALYST, SLIPPER, KRUGER, RIVERBANK and PALATE.
- Task Force 66 (Special Operations Task Groups IV – XX) – 26 January 2015
  - For sustained and outstanding warlike operational service in Afghanistan from 30 April 2007 to 31 December 2013, through the conduct of counter insurgency operations in support of the International Security Assistance Force.
  - Over a six-year period, Task Force 66 rendered outstanding service on operations in Afghanistan where it conducted highly successful counter insurgency operations within Uruzgan and surrounding provinces in support of the International Security Assistance Force. The Task Force's outstanding performance against an unrelenting, cunning and ruthless enemy, in an unforgiving environment, was achieved through the collective efforts of every member of the contingent over the duration of the commitment. The superior combat operations results of Task Group 66 further emphasised the Group's exceptional courage and commitment.
    - Acting on a recommendation of the Brereton War Crimes inquiry, Chief of the Defence Force General Angus Campbell wrote to the Governor-General David Hurley recommending that this award be revoked. In April 2021, Defence Minister Peter Dutton revoked this decision, but stated that those who have a conviction, or a finding of inappropriate behaviour, will have their citation revoked.
- No. 5 Flight RAAF – 13 June 2016
  - For sustained outstanding service in warlike operations through the provision of Intelligence, Surveillance and Reconnaissance capability on Operation SLIPPER, over the period January 2010 to November 2014.
- No. 36 and No. 37 Squadron RAAF – 13 June 2016
  - For sustained outstanding service in warlike operations throughout the Middle East Area of Operations over the period January 2002 to June 2014.
- Australian Service Contingents 1 and 2 – 25 July 2019
  - For sustained outstanding service in warlike operations as part of the United Nations Assistance Mission in Rwanda II on Operation TAMAR, over the period July 1994 to March 1996.
- HMAS Tobruk – 20 November 2023
  - For sustained outstanding service in warlike operations on Operation SOLACE in support of United Nations Security Council Resolution 794 to end hostilities in Somalia and establish a secure environment for the distribution of humanitarian aid in 1993.
- 1st Battalion, Royal Australian Regiment – 20 November 2023
  - For sustained outstanding service in warlike operations as part of the Unified Task Force on Operation SOLACE in Somalia, over the period December 1992 to May 1993.
- Australian Service Contingents I, II, III and IV – 20 November 2023
  - For sustained outstanding service in warlike operations as part of the first and second United Nations Operations in Somalia on Operation IGUANA, over the period October 1992 to November 1994.

== See also ==
- Australian Honours Order of Precedence
