= No. 94 Squadron RAAF =

Royal Australian Air Force squadron

- Active: 1945–1946
- Country: Australia
- Branch: Royal Australian Air Force
- Type: Heavy fighter

Aircraft flown
- Fighter: Mosquito

No. 94 Squadron was a Royal Australian Air Force fighter squadron of World War II. The unit did not complete its training before the end of the war and was disbanded eight months after formation.

== Squadron history ==
No. 94 Squadron was formed at Castlereagh, New South Wales, on 30 May 1945. It was planned to equip the squadron with de Havilland Mosquito aircraft and assign it to No. 86 Wing. Its personnel were housed at RAAF Base Richmond until 29 June when they moved to Castlereagh.

The squadron commenced training at Castlereagh in July. During this month 73.35 hours of flight training were conducted in Mosquito aircraft and No. 9 Airfield Construction Squadron built hard standings to protect the aircraft from waterlogged ground. Representatives from Rolls-Royce and de Havilland's propeller division also lectured No. 94 Squadron's ground and air crew. Delivery of the squadron's Mosquitos was slow, however, and this greatly hampered its training program.

No. 94 Squadron was informed on 18 September 1945 that it would cease to function from 20 September. The remnants of the squadron departed Castlereagh for Richmond on 7 January 1946 and it was disbanded there on 24 January.
