= No. 38 Squadron RAAF =

Royal Australian Air Force unit

- No. 38 Squadron's crest
- Active: 1943–2018
- Country: Australia
- Branch: Royal Australian Air Force
- Role: Light transport and conversion training Ground surveillance
- Part of: No. 86 Wing
- Garrison/HQ: RAAF Base Townsville
- Nickname: "Dingo Airlines"
- Motto: "Equal to the Task"
- Engagements: World War II; Malayan Emergency
- Battle honours: Malaya 1948–1960

Aircraft flown
- Transport: Hudson (1943–1944); Dakota (1944–1964); Caribou (1964–2009); King Air 350 (2009–2018)

No. 38 Squadron was a Royal Australian Air Force (RAAF) transport and training unit active between 1943 and 2018. It was formed on 15 September 1943 and saw service during World War II transporting supplies and personnel between Australia and the combat zones in New Guinea and Borneo, using Douglas Dakota aircraft. Following the war, the squadron conducted regular courier flights between Australia and Japan in 1947 and 1948. No. 38 Squadron was deployed to Singapore from 1950 to 1952, supplying Commonwealth forces engaged in the Malayan Emergency and undertaking courier flights across Asia. In 1954 it became responsible for training RAAF personnel to operate Dakotas.

After being re-equipped with de Havilland Canada DHC-4 Caribou in 1964, No. 38 Squadron served as the RAAF's operational conversion unit for the type and also conducted transport tasks within Australia and its territories. Throughout Australia's involvement in the Vietnam War, it prepared aircrew for operational service with No. 35 Squadron, and maintained a detachment in Papua and New Guinea to provide pilots with experience flying in tropical conditions. A Caribou was deployed to Pakistan from 1975 to 1978 to support United Nations peacekeepers, and detachments were established within Australia during the 1980s to provide search and rescue capabilities and work with Australian Army units. From 1999 until 2001, a detachment was deployed to East Timor as part of the Australian-led peacekeeping force in the newly independent nation. No. 38 Squadron continued to operate Caribou after No. 35 Squadron was disbanded in 2000, though the age of the aircraft increasingly affected its operations.

Following the retirement of the Caribou from service in 2009, No. 38 Squadron was re-equipped with eight Beechcraft King Air 350 aircraft. The squadron was stationed at RAAF Base Townsville, Queensland, and was responsible for training RAAF pilots to operate King Airs, and performing light transport and tasks. It was also believed to have a ground surveillance capability. The squadron disbanded on 29 November 2018, its aircraft and roles being transferred to No. 32 Squadron.

== History ==
=== World War II ===
No. 38 Squadron was formed as a transport unit at RAAF Base Richmond near Sydney on 15 September 1943. Equipped with Lockheed Hudsons, the squadron conducted its first operation on 17 December, when one of its aircraft flew from Richmond to RAAF Base Darwin. During the period No. 38 Squadron was equipped with Hudsons, it operated only within Australia.

The squadron's activities expanded in early 1944, when its obsolescent Hudsons were replaced with more capable Douglas Dakota transports. It received its first Dakota on 3 March 1944, and was completely equipped with the type by the end of May. While the squadron continued to fly to locations within Australia after receiving Dakotas, it also began transporting supplies to Allied forces fighting the Japanese in western New Guinea. During return flights from New Guinea, the Dakotas typically carried wounded personnel to Australia for treatment. In October 1944, No. 38 Squadron was given the additional task of supporting the RAAF's Paratroop Training Unit at Richmond. The squadron moved to RAAF Station Archerfield near Brisbane in early December 1944, but continued to maintain a detachment at Richmond. By this time No. 38 Squadron was mainly tasked with transporting supplies to the battle zone in New Guinea, which included making supply drops to Australian Army units in the field and evacuating casualties to the mainland. From 17 July 1945, the squadron maintained a detachment at Morotai Island, dropping supplies to Army units fighting in Borneo. No. 38 Squadron's only loss during World War II was a Dakota that crashed on a mountain in western New Guinea while flying between Biak and Morotai; the wreckage of this aircraft was not located until 1970.

After the war, No. 38 Squadron flew into Singapore, Bangkok and locations in Borneo to evacuate released Australian prisoners of war. The squadron also transported other service personnel back to Australia until 1946 as part of the demobilisation of the Australian military. During May 1946, three of No. 38 Squadron's Dakotas were assigned the unusual task of flying 25 tonnes of pig bristles from Chongqing in China to Hong Kong, from where the bristles were shipped to Australia. This mission, which was designated "Operation Pig Bristle", took two weeks and sought to rectify a shortage of paint brushes that was hindering the Australian construction industry.

=== Asian deployments ===
No. 38 Squadron relocated to RAAF Station Schofields near Sydney on 15 August 1946. It became part of No. 86 Wing, along with Nos. 36 and 37 Squadrons, which also operated Dakotas, and No. 486 (Maintenance) Squadron, which serviced the wing's flying units. Commencing on 22 January 1947, one of No. 38 Squadron's main responsibilities was to conduct thrice-weekly courier flights to Japan to support the Australian element of the British Commonwealth Occupation Force. These flights were the longest regular air route serviced by twin-engined aircraft at the time, and took several days. The courier flights continued until 13 January 1948, after which chartered Qantas aircraft were used to support the force in Japan. In August 1948, five of No. 38 Squadron's air crews were dispatched to Europe where, as members of the RAAF Squadron Berlin Air Lift, they participated in the international efforts to fly supplies into Berlin during the Soviet blockade of the city. These personnel remained in Europe for 12 months, and their absence greatly disrupted No. 38 Squadron's operations. Overall, twenty members of No. 86 Wing were sent to Europe; the resulting shortage of personnel forced Nos. 36 and 38 Squadrons to operate for a period as a single unit, all flying hours being attributed to No. 38 Squadron in official records. No. 86 Wing moved to Richmond between 22 June and 1 July 1949.

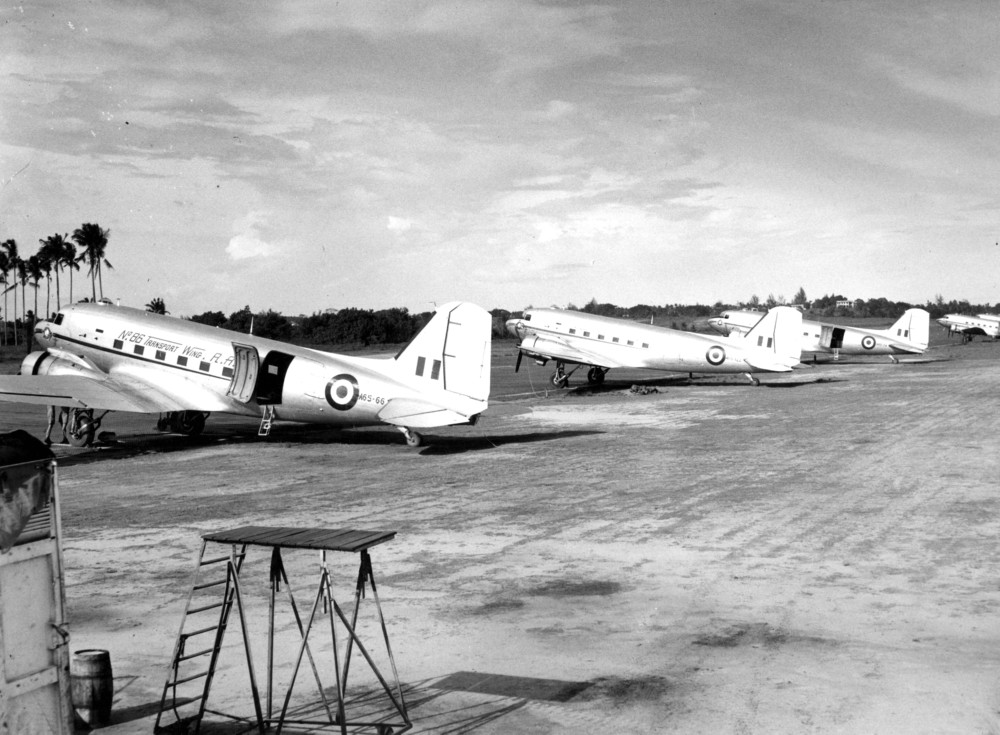
No. 38 Squadron Dakotas at RAF Changi in 1950

In 1950, No. 38 Squadron was selected to form part of the Australian force assigned to the Commonwealth Far East Air Force. As an element of this force, the Australian Government agreed for the unit to be tasked with courier flights across Asia and providing support for the British-led counterinsurgency operations in Malaya. The squadron's advance party arrived at RAF Changi in Singapore on 19 June 1950, and all of its personnel and eight Dakotas were operational there by 6 July. While in Malaya the squadron came under the command of No. 90 (Composite) Wing, along with the Avro Lincoln-equipped No. 1 Squadron. Half the squadron's aircrew were veterans of the Berlin Airlift, but none had any direct experience of tropical environments. No. 38 Squadron began flying transport missions in Malaya in early July, with British and New Zealand pilots accompanying its aircrews during the first two weeks of operations to help them become familiar with local conditions. From July 1950 until February 1951, No. 38 Squadron's main task was to conduct courier flights to Borneo, Ceylon, Hong Kong, Indonesia, Japan and the Philippines, and these remained an important responsibility throughout the period it was based at Singapore. Following the outbreak of the Korean War, the squadron flew British troops and supplies from Singapore to Japan and Korea, and four of No. 38 Squadron's Dakotas were transferred to No. 30 Communication Unit in Japan during November 1950.

After losing half its strength, No. 38 Squadron remained at Changi and conducted supply and aeromedical evacuation flights throughout Malaya to support the British-led forces there. The squadron's aircraft were also occasionally used to mark targets ahead of bombing raids and to drop propaganda leaflets. From April to July 1951, No. 38 Squadron and an attached flight from No. 41 Squadron RNZAF was stationed at RAF Kuala Lumpur, and was the main unit tasked with dropping supplies to Commonwealth forces in the field. The squadron made another deployment to Kuala Lumpur between November 1951 and February 1952. In February 1952, No. 38 Squadron successfully parachuted 54 personnel from the British 22nd Special Air Service Regiment into a remote area near the Malaya-Thailand border.

Supporting the Australian units in Korea placed heavy demands on the RAAF's transport force, which was too small to fully meet its domestic and international responsibilities, and it became increasingly difficult to sustain the four Dakotas in Malaya during 1952. As a result, the Australian Government decided in September that year to return the squadron to Australia. No. 38 Squadron left Changi for Richmond on 8 December. The squadron's only fatality during the deployment was an airman who was killed when the No. 110 Squadron RAF Dakota he was co-piloting crashed during a flight between Changi and Saigon on 31 August 1950.

=== Operational conversion unit ===
After returning to Richmond, No. 38 Squadron was mainly tasked with routine transport duties. The squadron also occasionally provided aircraft for CSIRO rainmaking experiments. During the 1950s and early 1960s, No. 38 Squadron developed a reputation as a "cowboy" unit with lax flying standards. The squadron did not conduct proper conversion courses, and new Dakota pilots received only ad-hoc instruction on the type while serving as the co-pilot during operational tasks. On 8 March 1953, No. 38 Squadron absorbed No. 36 Squadron's Dakotas, after which No. 30 Transport Unit (previously No. 30 Communication Unit) in Japan was renamed No. 36 Squadron. From late March until September 1954, No. 38 Squadron conducted VIP flights out of RAAF Station Canberra. In November that year, it was renamed the Transport Training Squadron and became responsible for instructing new Dakota crews and RAAF air movements personnel. It resumed its previous name on 13 June 1963.

No. 38 Squadron was re-equipped with new de Havilland Canada DHC-4 Caribou tactical transport aircraft during 1964. In January 1964 the unit's commanding officer, five other pilots and three navigators undertook conversion training on the type in Canada. At the completion of this course the personnel flew the RAAF's first three Caribous from Toronto to RAAF Base Richmond between 17 March and 22 April. The process of fully converting No. 38 Squadron to Caribous was delayed by the government's decision to deploy several of the aircraft to Vietnam; at the time this decision was made, in June 1964, the squadron had received six of its planned allocation of nine aircraft, and the next batch of three aircraft was sent directly to Vietnam. No. 38 Squadron was the last operational RAAF squadron to fly Dakotas, though several other units did so until the 1990s. After receiving its Caribous, No. 38 Squadron's main role was to train aircrews for operational service with the RAAF Transport Flight Vietnam (later redesignated No. 35 Squadron). On 1 July 1964, one of the squadron's Caribous suffered severe damage when it made a crash landing at HMAS Albatross; this aircraft was subsequently written off and its fuselage used for training purposes by the Army's 1st Commando Regiment. The squadron became an independent unit under Headquarters RAAF Base Richmond in August that year, following the disbandment of No. 86 Wing. On 13 October 1965, Detachment A of No. 38 Squadron began operations from Port Moresby in the Territory of Papua and New Guinea, equipped with two Caribous. One of the detachment's tasks was to give Caribou pilots experience in tropical and mountainous conditions, and all aircraft captains were required to complete at least one two-month deployment to Port Moresby before serving with No. 35 Squadron in Vietnam. In addition to its training role, No. 38 Squadron undertook transport flights in and around Australia, taking part when required in relief efforts following natural disasters.

=== Peacekeeping deployments ===
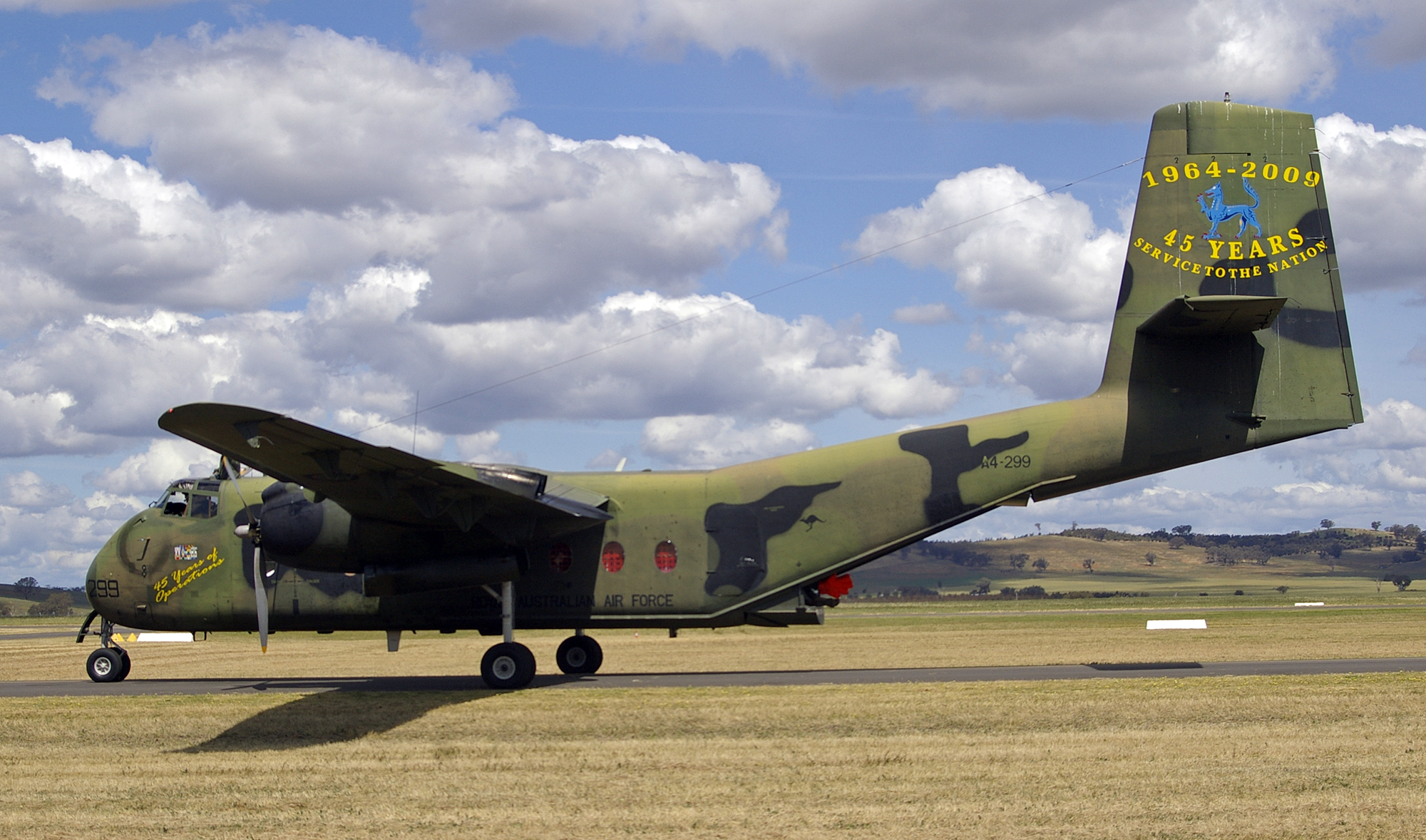
No. 38 Squadron Caribou in 2009

The squadron undertook two operational deployments during the mid-1970s. From March 1975 until November 1978 Detachment B, comprising a single Caribou and support staff, was stationed at Rawalpindi, Pakistan, and transported personnel and supplies for the United Nations Military Observer Group in India and Pakistan. From August to October 1975, a No. 38 Squadron Caribou was assigned to transport Red Cross supplies and personnel from Darwin to East Timor after a civil war broke out in that country. On 4 September that year this aircraft was hijacked by East Timorese soldiers, who forced the pilot to fly 54 refugees to Darwin; it remains the only RAAF aircraft ever to have been hijacked. Detachment A was no longer required after Papua New Guinea achieved independence from Australia and established its own defence force, and the unit was disbanded on 17 January 1976. Three Caribous were lost while operating with the detachment; A4-202 crashed near Porgera on 3 June 1965, A4-147 was written off after it landed short of the runway at Tapini Airport on 6 October 1968 and A4-233 was destroyed when it crashed at Kudjeru Gap on 28 August 1972. The last of these crashes caused the deaths of 25 aircrew and passengers, making it the RAAF's worst peacetime disaster; 21 of the people killed were high school students returning from an army cadet camp. Following the end of its permanent presence at Port Moresby, No. 38 Squadron continued to fly periodic training sorties in Papua New Guinea. During the 1980s, detachments of No. 38 Squadron were established at RAAF Base Darwin and RAAF Base Pearce near Perth to provide these regions with a search-and-rescue capability and to exercise with Army units. The Pearce detachment was nicknamed "Blackduck Airlines".

No. 38 Squadron moved from Richmond to RAAF Base Amberley, west of Brisbane, in October 1992. At this time the squadron continued to be responsible for all Caribou conversion training, as well as conducting tactical transport operations. The permanent detachment of No. 38 Squadron aircraft to RAAF Base Pearce ceased in 1999, and Detachment B of the squadron was established at RAAF Base Townsville in North Queensland during 2000. From 1999 until early 2001, elements of No. 38 Squadron, designated No. 86 Wing Detachment C, were stationed in East Timor and supported the international peacekeeping force which had been deployed there to end the violence that had broken out following a successful referendum on independence conducted in August 1999. At its peak strength, four Caribous were assigned to the detachment. The air and ground crew deployed to East Timor endured difficult living conditions until their accommodation and recreation facilities were upgraded in mid-2000, and the pilots were regularly required to fly into poorly maintained air strips. Despite the age of the Caribous and shortages of spare parts, Detachment C's ground crew managed to maintain a high aircraft serviceability rate. In 2000 No. 35 Squadron was deactivated, leaving No. 38 Squadron the RAAF's sole Caribou operator. By September 2002, No. 38 Squadron was equipped with 14 Caribous. In July 2003, two aircraft were deployed to the Solomon Islands as part of the Regional Assistance Mission to Solomon Islands peacekeeping force. Both Caribous were based at Honiara International Airport, and a detachment remained in the country until July 2004. All of No. 38 Squadron moved to RAAF Base Townsville during 2008.

=== Light transport and surveillance ===
By the late 2000s the Caribous were becoming difficult to maintain, and were no longer capable of operating in war zones as they lacked electronic warfare systems and other forms of self-protection. As a result, it was decided in late 2008 to retire the aircraft and replace them with Beechcraft King Air 350s on an interim basis until another tactical transport entered service. The Caribous were gradually retired from May 2009, the last leaving service on 27 November that year when A4-140 was flown to Canberra and handed over to the Australian War Memorial for preservation. By the time the aircraft were retired, No. 38 Squadron had been operating Caribous for 45 years.

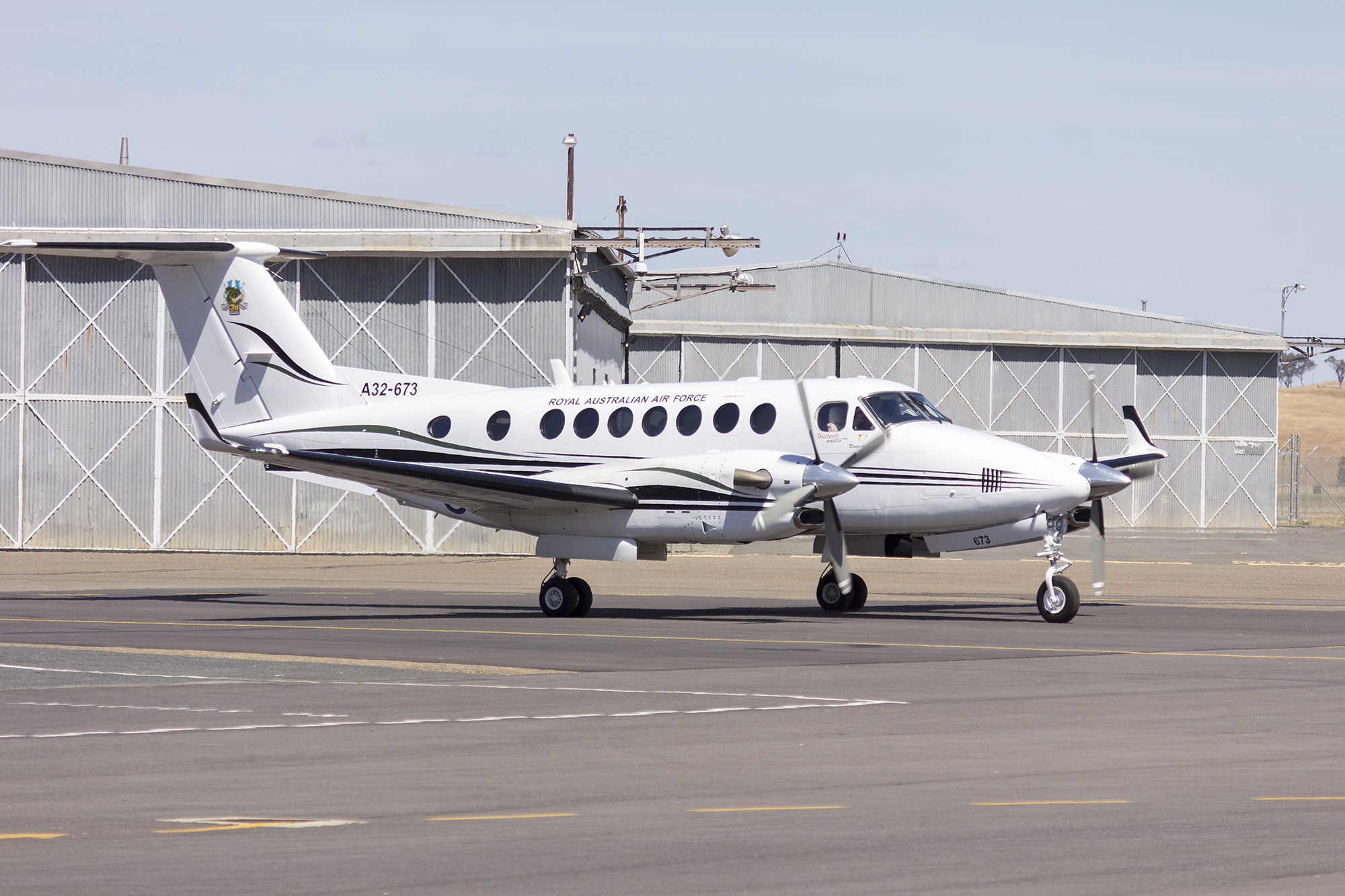
No. 38 Squadron King Air in 2013

Three King Air 350s were transferred to No. 38 Squadron from the Army's 173rd Surveillance Squadron on 20 November 2009, and deliveries of a further five newly built aircraft were completed in July 2010. At least one of the Army aircraft is believed to have been fitted with ground surveillance sensors, and this capacity was retained after it was transferred to the Air Force. No. 38 Squadron's King Airs were initially operated by Army personnel, who were given the choice of transferring to the RAAF or converting to helicopters at the end of their posting. The other No. 38 pilots were converted to the type at the Army's Oakey Army Aviation Centre, but the squadron began conducting its own conversion courses after the second batch of five aircraft were delivered. No. 38 Squadron marked its 70th anniversary in 2013.

In March 2015 two No. 38 Squadron King Airs were deployed to Vanuatu as part of Australia's aid effort following Cyclone Pam. The aircraft were used to conduct flights over the affected areas to assess the extent of the damage, and also evacuated Australian and New Zealand citizens. All of the RAAF's King Airs were grounded from 30 June 2016 after the hazardous chemical strontium chromate was detected in the aircraft; in the period immediately before the grounding No. 38 Squadron had been involved in flying politicians during the 2016 federal election. The King Airs began to return to service on 4 August that year after being cleaned. As part of its budget for the 2016–17 financial year, the Australian Government announced that Intelligence, Surveillance, Target Acquisition, Reconnaissance, Electronic Warfare equipment would be acquired for three of No. 38 Squadron's King Airs. This equipment comprised roll-on/roll-off kits, and was scheduled to be delivered during the financial year.

In February 2016 it was reported that the RAAF was considering consolidating its two squadrons equipped with King Airs into a single squadron located at RAAF Base East Sale. No. 38 Squadron began to be reduced in size during that year. In February 2018 the Department of Defence announced that No. 38 Squadron would relocate to RAAF Base East Sale later that year. The September 2018 edition of Australian Aviation reported that No. 38 Squadron was to be disbanded in November 2018.

No. 38 Squadron was disbanded at a ceremony at RAAF Base Townsville on 29 November 2018. This marked the end of 75 years continuous service, the longest period for any RAAF squadron. Its aircraft and role, including the Intelligence, Surveillance, Target Acquisition, Reconnaissance, Electronic Warfare function, was transferred to No. 32 Squadron.

== Role prior to disbandment ==
In its final role, No. 38 Squadron was responsible for providing conversion training on the King Air and conducting light transport operations. As of 2014, the unit had a strength of 60 RAAF personnel as well as 25 aircraft maintenance contractors from Hawker Pacific. It was organised into two flights; A Flight undertook transport operations, and B Flight was responsible for delivering training courses. As of 2018, the squadron's Intelligence, Surveillance, Target Acquisition, Reconnaissance, Electronic Warfare capabilities were classified, but were reported to include a communications relay function. The aircraft had also been used as a platform for aerial photography after being transferred to the RAAF; this has included taking photographs to be used in map making. Along with Nos. 33 and 36 Squadrons, No. 38 Squadron formed part of No. 86 Wing.

The RAAF was satisfied with the King Air's performance in the light transport role, though the aircraft could not be deployed into combat areas. No. 38 Squadron often operated with the Army's Townsville-based 3rd Brigade, as well as the 51st Battalion, Far North Queensland Regiment, which conducts operational patrols across Far North Queensland during peacetime. The unit was also frequently tasked with transporting senior politicians and other VIPs. The King Airs often operated in Papua New Guinea, as well as other parts of the Asia-Pacific region.
