= No. 35 Squadron RAAF =

Royal Australian Air Force squadron

- No. 35 Squadron's crest
- Active: 1942–1946; 1966–2000; 2013–current
- Branch: Royal Australian Air Force
- Role: Tactical transport
- Part of: No. 84 Wing
- Garrison/HQ: RAAF Base Amberley
- Nickname: "Wallaby Airlines"
- Motto: "Adept"
- Aircraft: C-27J Spartan
- Engagements: World War II; Vietnam War
- Decorations: Republic of Vietnam Cross of Gallantry with Palm Unit Citation

Insignia
- Callsign: Wallaby

No. 35 Squadron is a Royal Australian Air Force (RAAF) transport unit. Formed in 1942, 35 Squadron operated during World War II, transporting cargo and passengers around Australia, New Guinea and the Netherlands East Indies, with a variety of aircraft including the Douglas Dakota. The squadron disbanded in 1946, but was re-raised in the 1960s for service during the Vietnam War, flying transportation and resupply operations with DHC-4 Caribous in support of Australian and US forces. The squadron was relocated to Australia in 1972 and subsequently augmented in 1977 with rotary-wing aircraft, operating UH-1 Iroquois in both the transportation and gunship roles, until returned to a solely fixed-wing transport role in 1989. Ceasing operations in 2000, 35 Squadron was re-raised in January 2013, preparatory to re-equipping with C-27 Spartan transports and commencing operations in 2015.

== History ==
=== World War II ===
No. 35 Squadron was formed at RAAF Station Pearce, Western Australia, on 11 March 1942, under the command of Flight Lieutenant Percival Burdeu, as a transport unit. After moving to Maylands, the squadron's operations were restricted to flying only within Western Australia as it was equipped with just one de Havilland Dragon and a de Havilland Fox Moth. Later in the year, the squadron was augmented with an assortment of aircraft including de Havilland Moth Minors, Fairey Battles, de Havilland Tiger Moths, an Avro Anson, a de Havilland Dragon Rapide and a Northrop Delta. In August 1943, the squadron was moved back to Pearce, where it was re-equipped with Douglas Dakotas; following this its operations were extended to cover all of Australia.

During the later years of the war the squadron provided air transport to the Australian military throughout the South West Pacific area, operating out of Guildford, Western Australia, Brisbane, Queensland, and Cape York. In the final years of the war, detachments operated out of Darwin, Northern Territory, Townsville, Queensland, and later Morotai Island. Following the Japanese surrender in August 1945, No. 35 Squadron flew Australian soldiers and ex-prisoners of war home. In early 1946, it supported the movement of No. 81 (Fighter) Wing to Japan as part of the British Commonwealth Occupation Force. The squadron was disbanded at Townsville on 10 June 1946.

=== Vietnam War ===
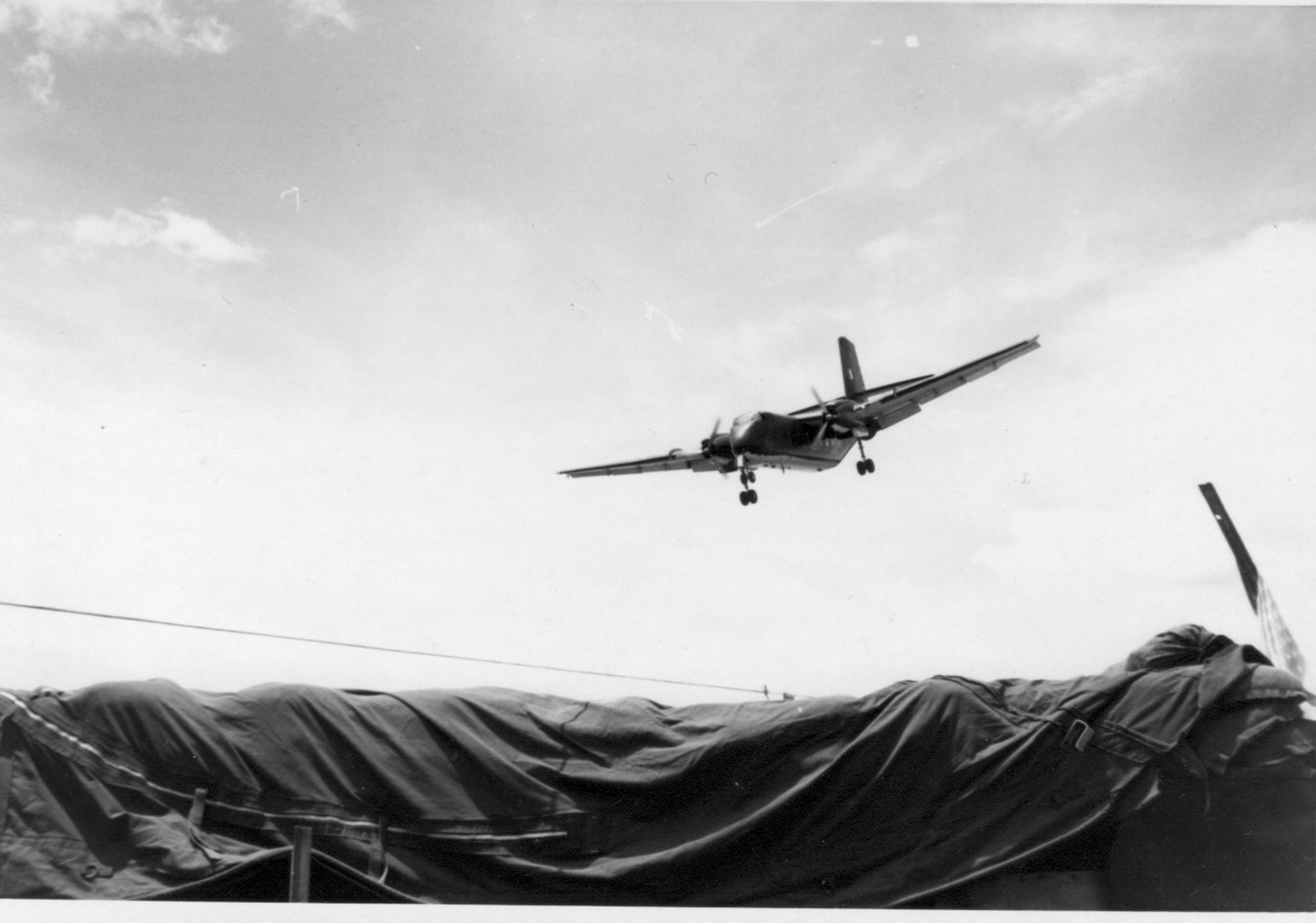
No. 35 Squadron Caribou on approach to land during the Vietnam War, 1971

On 1 June 1966, the RAAF Transport Flight Vietnam (RTFV), which had been formed for operations in Vietnam in July 1964, was redesignated No. 35 Squadron at Vung Tau Air Base in South Vietnam. Assigned to the 834th Air Division, Seventh Air Force, and operating DHC-4 Caribous, the re-formed squadron flew cargo, passenger and medevac flights throughout South Vietnam in support of Australian, South Vietnamese and United States forces. During its time in Vietnam the squadron was nicknamed "Wallaby Airlines", in reference to its callsign "Wallaby". Despite not being employed in an offensive role, the squadron's aircraft were regularly called upon to fly into dangerous areas of the conflict zone, often at low level, and on several occasions the Caribous were fired upon and aircrew wounded.

By June 1971, the squadron's complement of aircraft was reduced from seven to four as a part of the drawdown of Australia's forces in Vietnam; as a result of requirements for maintenance, however, only two aircraft were operational at any one time after this. No. 35 Squadron flew its last mission on 13 February 1972 and departed South Vietnam for RAAF Base Richmond in Australia on 19 February 1972; it was the last RAAF unit to leave following the decision to withdraw. During the five years that it was deployed, the squadron lost two aircraft destroyed in accidents, the result of poor weather and the difficult nature of some of the landing grounds that the Caribous were required to use when supporting isolated garrisons. Another aircraft was destroyed from Viet Cong mortar fire, struck while conducting a resupply mission at Thất Sơn in 1970.

Although its work was not glamorous, the squadron developed a good reputation among the US air commanders as an efficient and effective unit, achieving a record that prompted US commanders to send personnel to the squadron to study their techniques. For their involvement in operations in Vietnam, members of the squadron received several honours and decorations including two appointments to the Member of the Order of British Empire, eight Distinguished Flying Crosses, one Distinguished Flying Medal, one British Empire Medal, and 36 Mentions in Despatches.

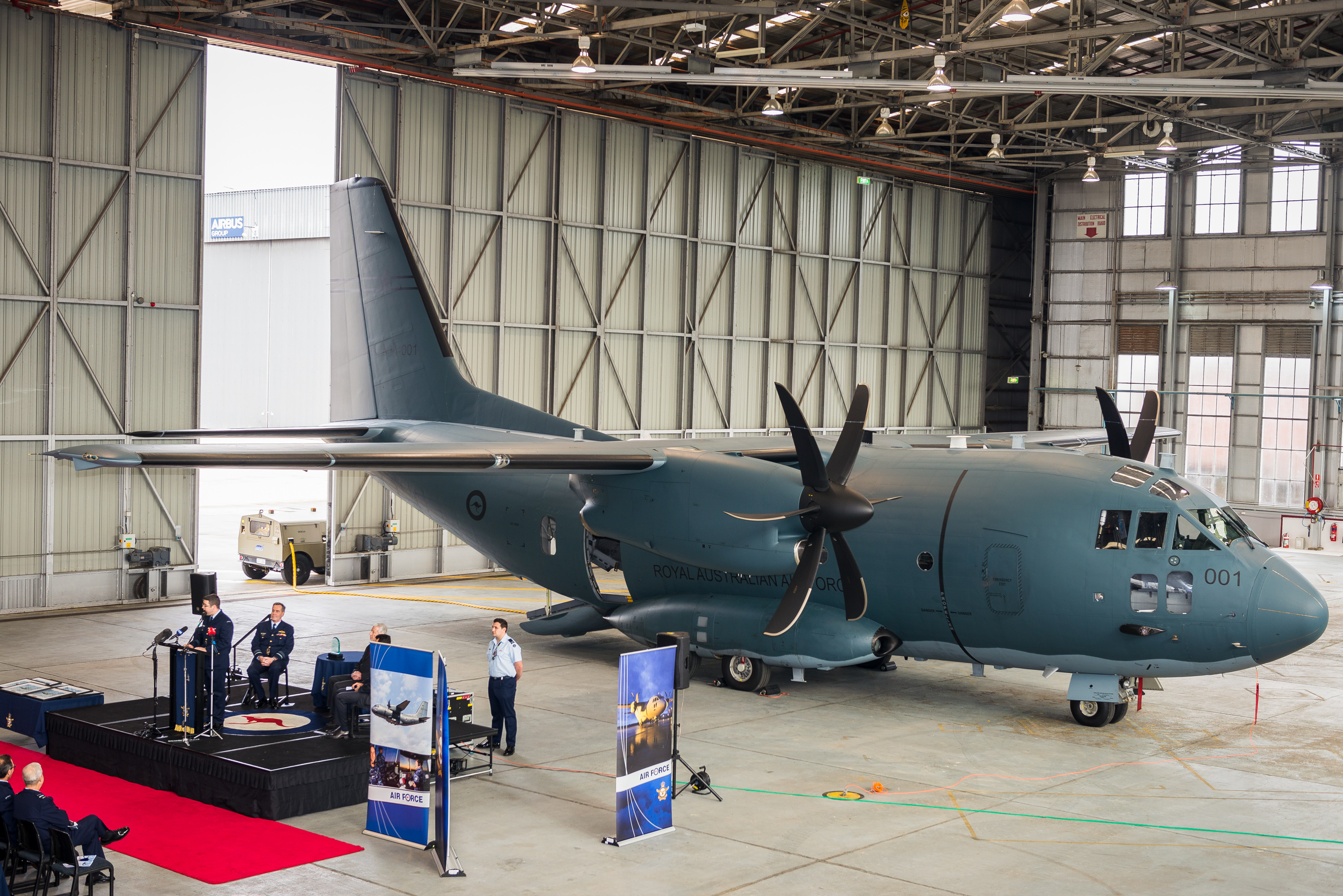
First RAAF Alenia C-27J Spartan arrives at RAAF Base Richmond for No. 35 Squadron, 2015

=== 1972–2000 ===
In 1976, No. 35 Squadron was relocated north to RAAF Base Townsville, where it operated in support of Army units based in Northern Australia. In early 1977 the squadron's role was expanded when it was equipped with four UH-1 Iroquois helicopters as well as its Caribous, making it the only RAAF squadron to ever be simultaneously equipped with rotary- and fixed-wing aircraft. These aircraft were employed in a multitude of roles including support to the local community in the form of flood relief, medevac and search and rescue operations. No. 35 Squadron's role was further expanded in November 1986 when it was issued with gunship variants of the UH-1, which it received when No. 9 Squadron RAAF converted to flying Sikorsky UH-60 Black Hawk.

In November 1989, No. 35 Squadron reverted to a purely fixed-wing role when responsibility for flying the UH-1 helicopters was transferred to the Australian Army. Operating eight Caribous, the squadron continued to provide tactical transport to Army units based in Northern Australia until 2000, when it was reduced to "paper only" status and its aircraft transferred to No. 38 Squadron.

=== 2013–current ===
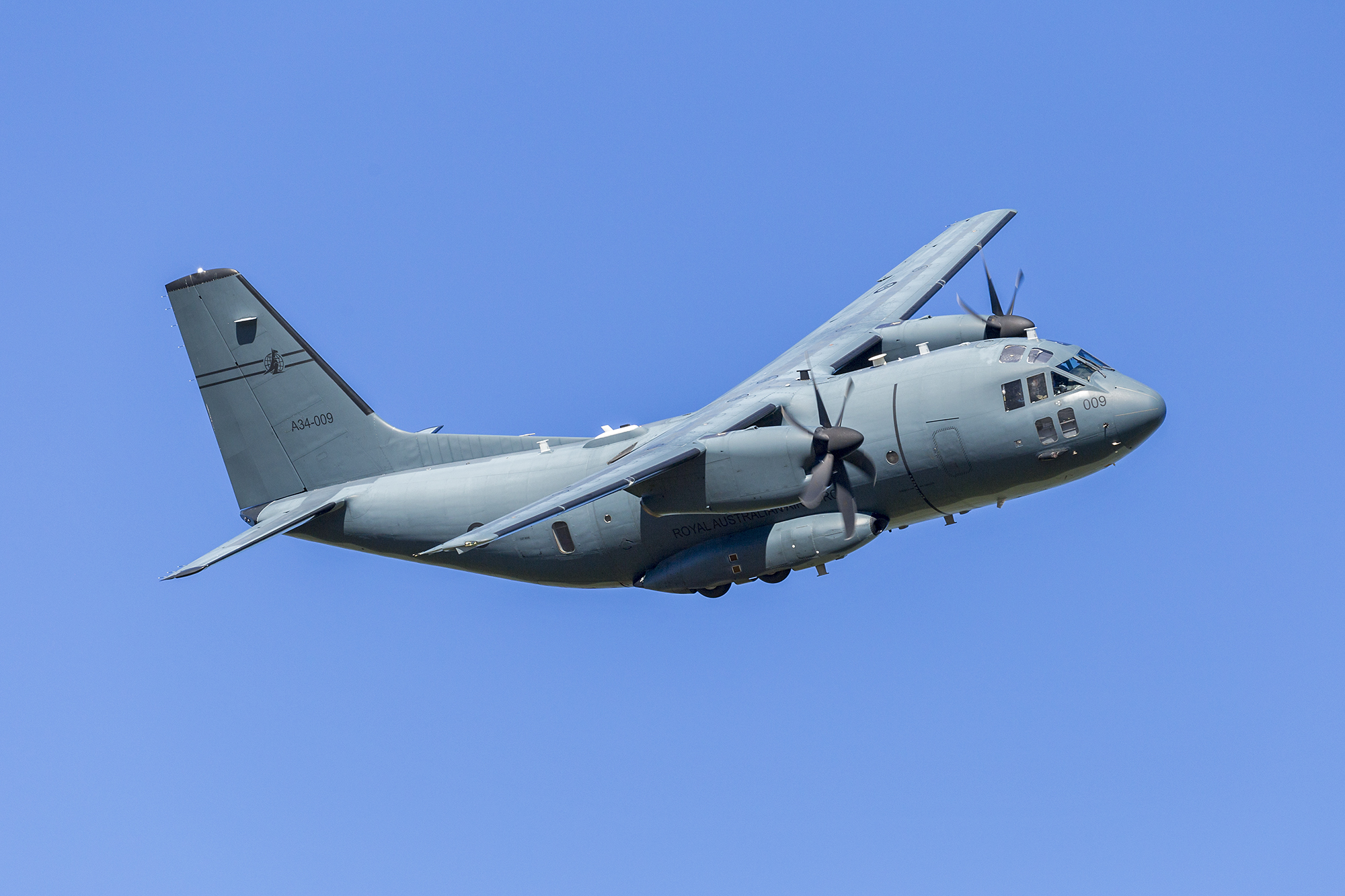
No. 35 Squadron Alenia C-27J Spartan flying over Wagga Wagga Airport in 2019

On 14 January 2013, No. 35 Squadron was re-raised under the command of Wing Commander Brad Clarke as an element of No. 84 Wing. A skeleton organisation, the squadron was expected to expand to approximately 250 personnel by 2015, when it was scheduled to begin operating the RAAF's ten Alenia C-27J Spartan transport aircraft. The squadron is based at RAAF Base Richmond. On 21 January 2014 No. 35 Squadron was temporarily transferred from No. 84 Wing to the C-27J Transition Team. The squadron returned to No. 84 Wing mid 2016 once 35 Squadron was nearing Initial Operating Capability. The RAAF's first C-27J arrived in Australia on 25 June 2015, and No. 35 Squadron began operating the aircraft from RAAF Base Richmond. The squadron planned to move to RAAF Base Amberley prior to achieving full operational capability in early 2019. The unit reached initial operating capacity in December 2016. It received its tenth and final aircraft on 2 April 2018.

In July 2021, the RAAF changed the operational role of the C-27J from Battlefield Airlifter to Light Tactical Fixed Wing due to its missile approach warning system which had to be either upgraded or replaced. The RAAF was the sole operator of the C-27J in the US Joint Cargo Aircraft configuration with its self-protection system installed by L-3 Integrated Systems in the United States. In its reduced role the C-27J was to provide "support for humanitarian disaster relief, crisis response and regional engagements". In 2026, Defence announced in the 2026 National Defence Strategy that the C-27J fleet would be retired and that it would be replaced with a commercial aircraft fleet.

== Aircraft operated ==
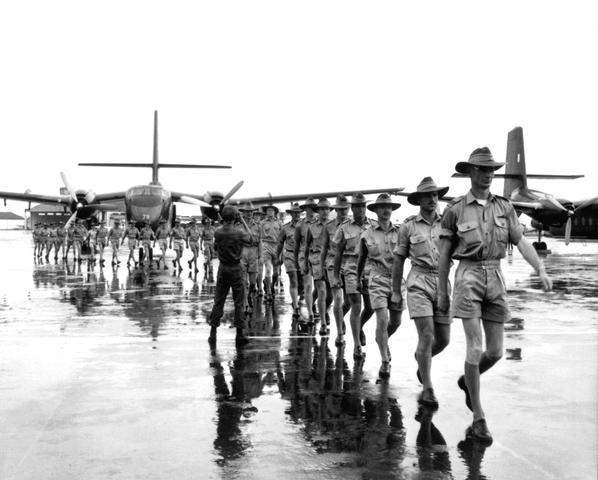
Personnel and aircraft of RAAF Transport Flight Vietnam arriving in South Vietnam in August 1964; the unit was later redesignated No. 35 Squadron.

No. 35 Squadron operated the following aircraft:

- de Havilland Fox Moth (1942–1943);
- de Havilland Dragon (1942–1943);
- de Havilland Moth Minor (1942–1943);
- Fairey Battle (1942–1943);
- de Havilland Tiger Moth (1942–1943);
- Avro Anson (1942–1943);
- de Havilland Dragon Rapide (1942–1943);
- Northrop Delta (1942–1943);
- Douglas Dakota (1943–1946);
- de Havilland Canada DHC-4 Caribou (1966–2000);
- Bell UH-1 Iroquois (1977–1989) and
- C-27J Spartan (2015–present)
