= No. 85 Wing RAAF =

85WG
- Active: March 10, 1945
- Branch: RAAF
- Role: Air Lift Group training
- Part of: Air Lift Group
- Garrison/HQ: RAAF Base Richmond

Commanders
- Notable commanders: Robyn Clay-Williams

No. 85 Wing is a Royal Australian Air Force wing. The wing is responsible for planning and coordinating training for the RAAF's Air Lift Group.

== History ==
No. 85 Wing was formed on 10 March 1945 at RAAF Base Amberley as a heavy bomber wing. It commanded the B-24 Liberator-equipped No. 12 Squadron and No. 99 Squadron, as well as No. 31 Air Stores Park and No. 85 Operational Base Unit, until it was disbanded on 19 November 1945. No. 85 Wing was reformed on 1 August 1999 at RAAF Base Richmond to command several training units.
