= Air Mobility Group RAAF =

Force element group of the Royal Australian Air Force

Air Mobility Group
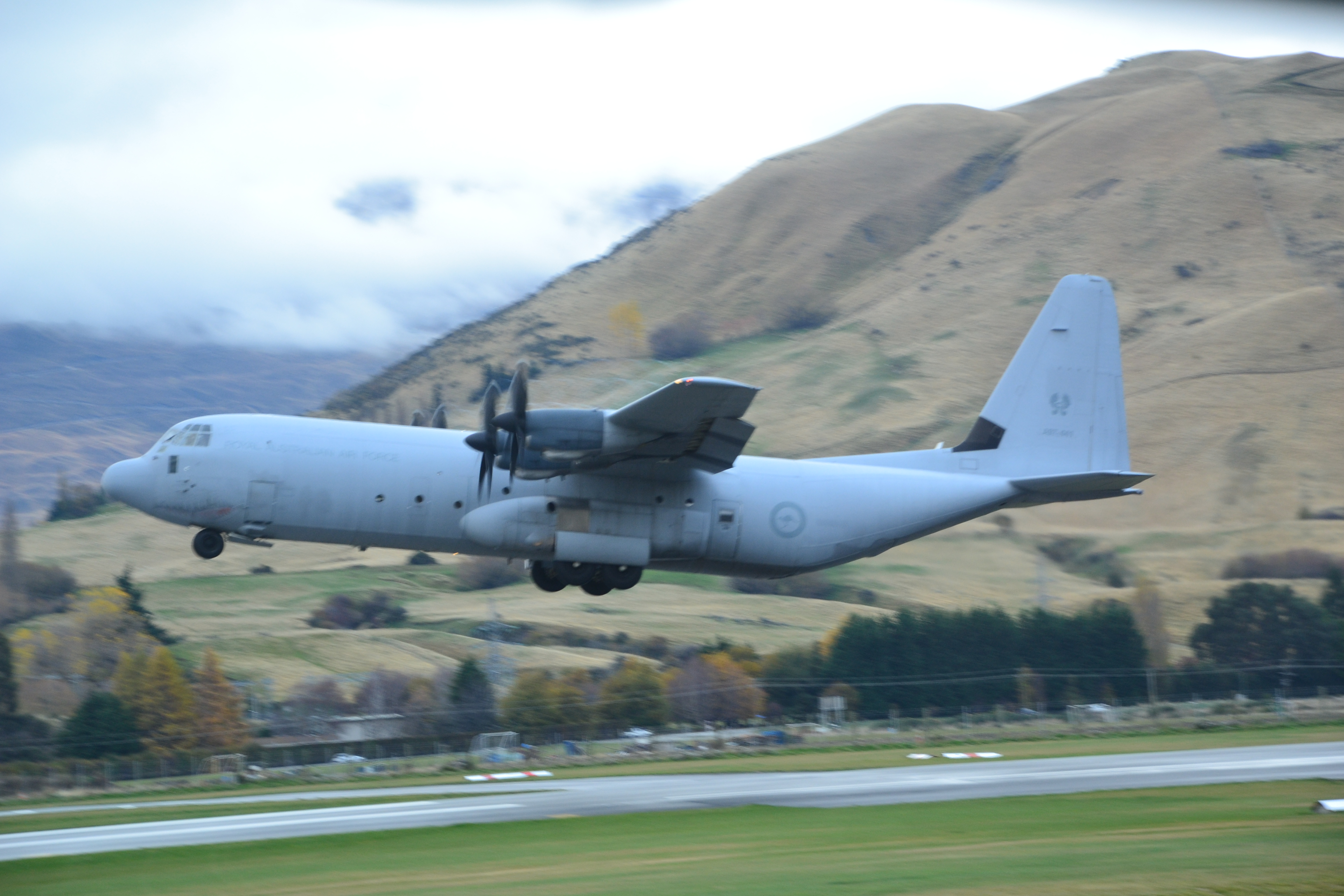
- One of the twelve C-130J Hercules operated by Air Mobility Group's No. 37 Squadron
- Active: 1987–current
- Country: Australia
- Branch: Royal Australian Air Force
- Part of: Air Command
- Garrison/HQ: RAAF Base Richmond
- Motto(s): "Mobility and reach"

Air Mobility Group (AMG) is one of six force element groups in the Royal Australian Air Force (RAAF). It is responsible for airlift and air-to-air refuelling operations.

== Establishment and evolution ==
Air Mobility Group (AMG) was formed as Air Lift Group (ALG) in February 1987. Its name was changed to Air Mobility Group on 1 April 2014.

== Responsibilities and bases ==
Airlift capabilities can be classified as:

- Strategic airlift (long-distance transport between theatres, areas of operations or communication zones)
- Tactical airlift (rapid and responsive movement within an area of operation)

Roles of airlift include:

- Airborne operations
- Air logistics support
- Special operations support
- VIP transport
- Aeromedical evacuation

Air-to-air refuelling is classified as a force multiplier, and is also the responsibility of AMG.
