= Lockheed C-130 Hercules in Australian service =

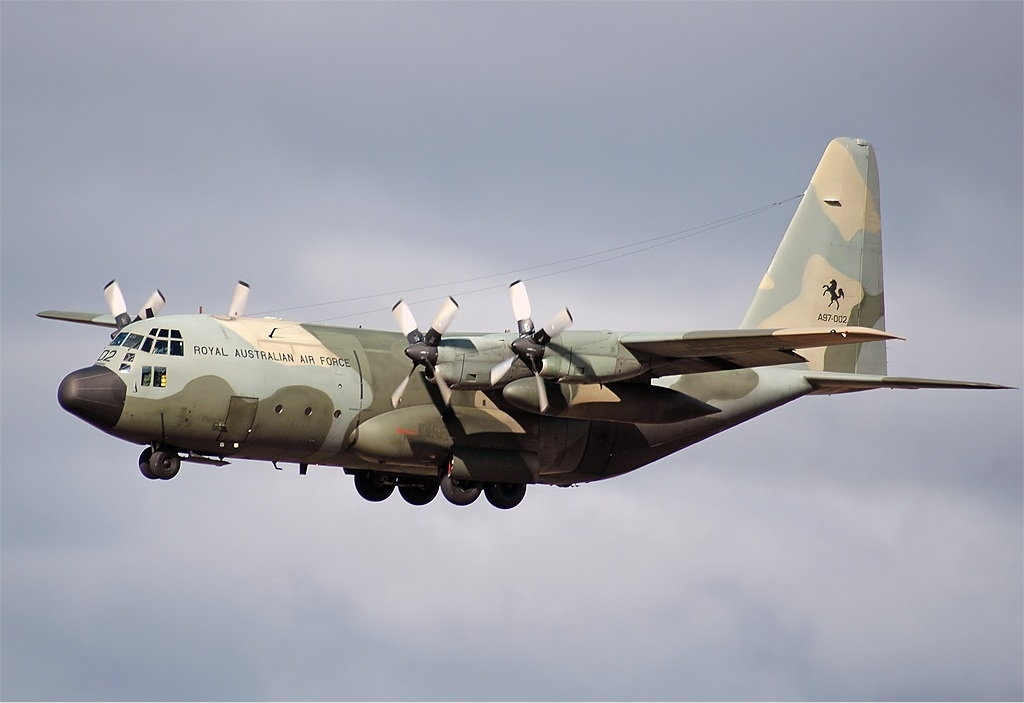
- One of the RAAF's C-130H Hercules in 2004

General information
- Type: Military transport aircraft
- Manufacturer: Lockheed and Lockheed Martin
- Primary user: No. 36 Squadron (1958–2006); No. 37 Squadron (1966–current)

History
- In service: 1958–current

The Royal Australian Air Force (RAAF) has operated forty-eight Lockheed C-130 Hercules transport aircraft. The type entered Australian service in December 1958, when No. 36 Squadron accepted the first of twelve C-130As, replacing its venerable Douglas C-47 Dakotas. The acquisition made Australia the first operator of the Hercules after the United States. In 1966 the C-130As were joined by twelve C-130Es, which equipped No. 37 Squadron. The C-130As were replaced by twelve C-130Hs in 1978, and the C-130Es by twelve C-130J Super Hercules in 1999. No. 37 Squadron became the RAAF's sole Hercules operator in 2006, when No. 36 Squadron transferred its C-130Hs before converting to Boeing C-17 Globemaster III heavy transports. The C-130Hs were retired in November 2012, leaving the C-130J as the only model in Australian service. A further twenty C-130Js will be ordered to replace the current fleet.

The RAAF's first strategic airlifter, the Hercules has frequently been used to deliver disaster relief in Australia and the Pacific region, as well as to support military deployments overseas. The aircraft saw extensive service during the Vietnam War, transporting troops and cargo to Southeast Asia and undertaking aeromedical evacuation. Nineteen of the RAAF's fleet of twenty-four C-130s took part in relief efforts in 1974–75 after Cyclone Tracy struck Darwin. Since then, the Hercules have been involved in humanitarian missions to New Guinea, Ethiopia, Rwanda, Cambodia, Bali, Sumatra, and New Zealand. They have also seen service during the Iranian Revolution in 1979, the Fijian coups in 1987, operations in Somalia in 1993, INTERFET operations in East Timor in 1999–2000, and the wars in Afghanistan and Iraq from 2001 to 2021. In over fifty years of Australian service, the Hercules have accumulated more than 800,000 flying hours.

== Acquisition ==
=== Initial selection and purchase ===
At the end of World War II, the RAAF's prime transport aircraft was the twin-engined Douglas C-47 Dakota. In 1946, C-47 operations were concentrated under No. 86 Wing and its three flying squadrons, Nos. 36, 37, and 38, based initially at RAAF Station Schofields, New South Wales. Despite the robustness and versatility of the Dakota, by the early 1950s the Air Force was looking for a replacement with greater cargo capacity and longer range, to better facilitate the deployment and supply of Australian forces. In 1954, the RAAF embarked on a major re-equipment drive, following a shift in defence funding that favoured the Air Force. The Air Officer Commanding Home Command, Air Vice Marshal Alister Murdoch, led a mission overseas to examine potential new fighter, bomber, transport and training aircraft.

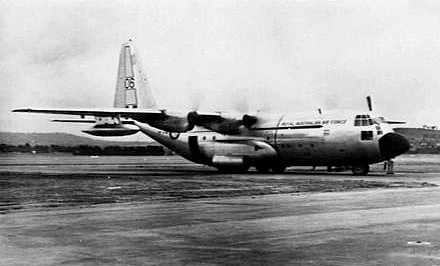
C-130A Hercules of No. 36 Squadron

Four British transports were considered: the Blackburn Beverley, Bristol 179B, Bristol 195 and Short PD 16/1. The mission also assessed the American Fairchild C-119G Flying Boxcar, Fairchild C-123 Provider and Lockheed C-130A Hercules. Of these types, the mission assessed that the Beverley, C-123 and C-130 could potentially meet the RAAF's requirements. Following further consideration of the options after their return to Australia, in early 1955 the members of the mission unanimously recommended that Hercules be procured, as the other two types did not meet some of the most important elements of the requirement. At this time the Australian Government was reluctant to fund any new equipment for the RAAF, and a decision to acquire twelve C-130s was not made until mid-1957. A contract for these aircraft was signed in October that year. The Australian C-130As were to be similar to those in service with the United States Air Force (USAF), the main difference being the use of TF56-A-11 engines in the place of the usual TF56-A-1 and TF56-A-9s; these engines provided almost the same power, but were modified to meet Australian fuel requirements. The total cost for the aircraft, initial crew training and support equipment was $US36 million (equivalent to about 16 million Australian pounds).

The Hercules represented a huge improvement over the C-47 in payload, range, speed and manoeuvrability, as well as offering cabin pressurisation, short-takeoff-and-landing capability, and bulk loading and despatch via its rear cargo door. The Government expressed concern over the price, at one stage proposing the purchase of only three aircraft, but eventually the Air Force won approval for the twelve that it wanted. Described by the official history of the post-war RAAF as second only to the General Dynamics F-111C as the "most significant" acquisition by the Air Force, the Hercules gave the Australian military its first strategic airlift capability, which in years to come would provide a "lifeline" for deployments to Malaya, Vietnam, and other parts of Southeast Asia. Australia was the first country other than the United States to operate the Hercules. The RAAF's C-130As were also the last of this variant to be built.

RAAF crews began training on the Hercules in mid-1958 at Sewart Air Force Base in Nashville, Tennessee. Much of the training took place on a simulator, augmented by approximately fifty hours flying time in the aircraft. To cope with the Hercules' complexities, the aircrew category of flight engineer, absent from the RAAF since World War II, was reinstated. A new category, that of loadmaster, was also instituted; airmen performing similar duties on Dakotas had done so on an ad hoc rather than a permanent basis, without a distinct category having been formalised. A specialist crew member was needed to make weight-and-balance calculations and oversee loading and despatch for the Hercules' 20-tonne freight capacity (compared to three-and-a-half tonnes in a Dakota) and for its range of cargo-delivery systems. A large hangar previously used to service seaplanes at RAAF Base Rathmines was disassembled and re-erected at RAAF Base Richmond, New South Wales, where the C-130s would be based.

=== C-130E and C-130H acquisition ===
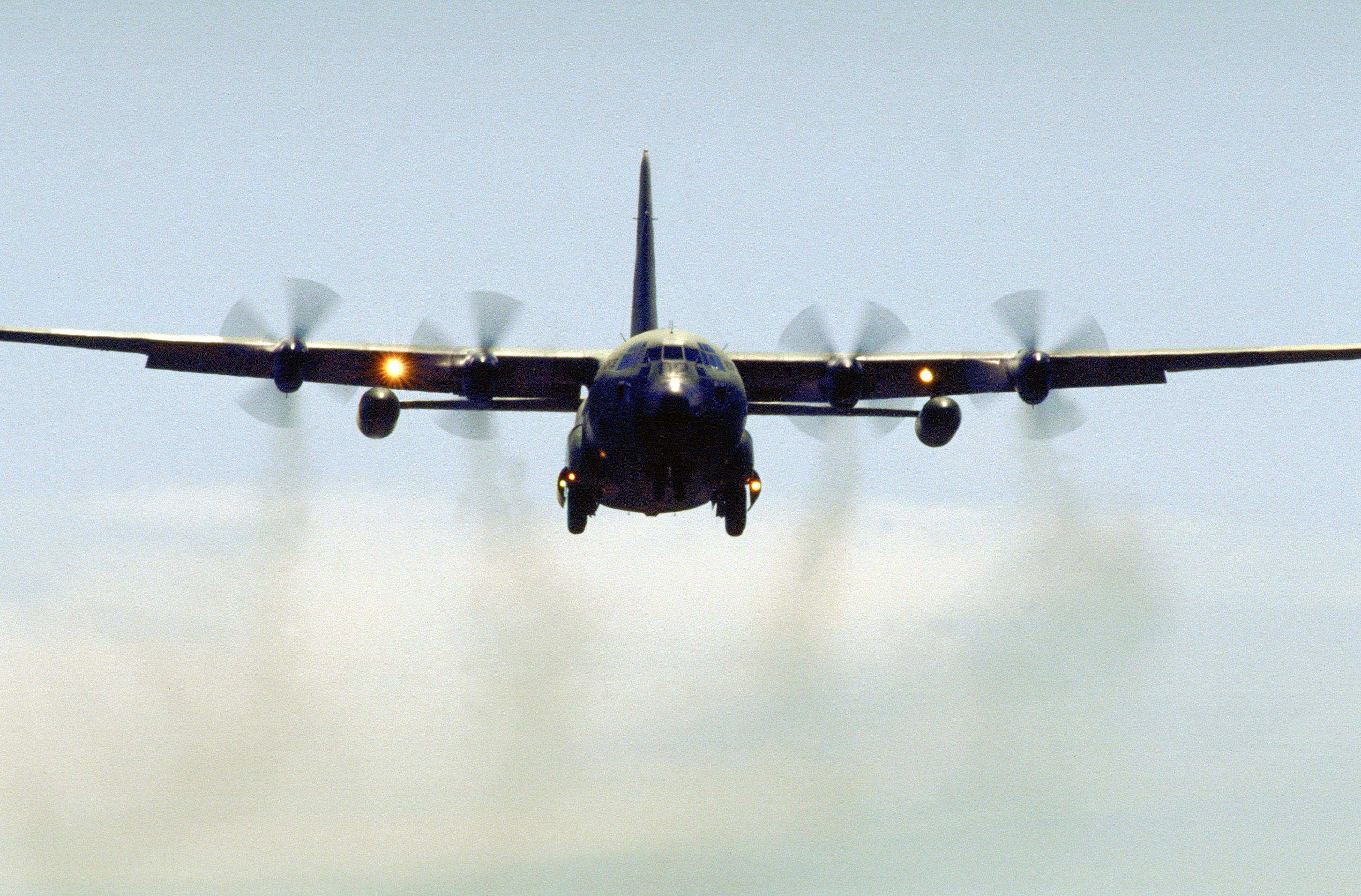
RAAF C-130H in 1994

A decision to purchase another twelve C-130s was announced in November 1964. At this time the C-130As were being used to supply the Australian forces engaged in the Vietnam War. This task demonstrated that the RAAF had insufficient long-ranged transport aircraft to simultaneously support overseas deployments and meet the force's domestic requirements in Australia. As a result, the Government decided to order twelve C-130E Hercules as part of a package of acquisitions for the RAAF and Royal Australian Navy (RAN) that also included ten Lockheed P-3 Orion and fourteen Grumman S-2 Tracker maritime patrol aircraft, as well as twelve Hawker Siddeley HS 748 transports. The 14.7-million-pound contract for the new C-130s was signed on 9 February 1965. In contrast to the concerns raised by the government over the cost of purchasing the C-130As, this expansion of the Hercules force gained ready agreement, due in no small part to the benefits for the armed services, particularly the Australian Army, demonstrated by the first twelve aircraft. The long-serving C-130As were replaced by new Hercules in the late 1970s; twelve C-130Hs were ordered in June 1976 for a cost of $A86 million, and deliveries took place between July and October 1978.

The RAAF's early model Hercules received several repairs and modifications during their service lives. During the early 1960s all of the C-130As were flown to the United States to receive new wing fuel tanks after the original tanks were affected by corrosion caused by tropical fungi and bacteria. Later that decade these aircraft received new panels on the upper surface of their wings after the original ones were found to be faulty. The C-130Es were also fitted with strengthened wing centre boxes in the early 1970s after equivalent USAF aircraft were found to be suffering from greater-than-expected wing stress during operations in Vietnam. During 1964 the C-130As received new doppler navigation systems, and the C-130Es and Hs were fitted with ring laser gyroscope inertial navigation systems from 1989. In 1994, four of No. 36 Squadron's C-130Hs were equipped with Electronic Warfare Self Protection packs, including radar and missile warning systems, and counter measures such as chaff and flares. Later in the decade, one of the C-130Hs was fitted with extensive signals intelligence equipment under the classified "Project Peacemate"; this aircraft was crewed by RAAF and Defence Signals Directorate personnel and its existence was never publicly confirmed by the Government. The modified C-130H was reported to still be active in the signals intelligence role in 2008. The C-130Hs were also among the first Australian military aircraft to be modified to allow aircrew to operate them while wearing night vision goggles.

=== C-130J acquisition and planned fleet expansion ===
The Australian Government ordered twelve C-130J Super Hercules in December 1995 and deliveries began during 1999. As part of the deal negotiated with Lockheed Martin, seven of the RAAF's C-130Es were transferred to the company in return for a reduced price on the new aircraft. At the time the order for the twelve C-130Js was placed, the Government also took out options for a further twenty-seven Super Hercules, but these were not taken up; the options included seven airborne early warning and control and eight aerial refuelling variants, as well as up to eight transports for the Royal New Zealand Air Force. The RAAF was the first operator of this C-130 variant, which was larger than earlier models and had a crew of only three (two pilots and a loadmaster) eliminating the navigator and flight engineer roles employed in earlier models. The aircraft initially suffered from serious mechanical and software problems as well as a shortage of spare parts, and were assessed as "experiencing significant operational shortfalls" in a 2002 Australian National Audit Office report. The Defence Science and Technology Organisation undertook considerable research into the C-130J design and developed improvements to the aircraft that addressed problems with excessive vibration. The 2009 Defence white paper Defending Australia in the Asia Pacific Century: Force 2030 called for the acquisition of two more C-130Js to partially replace the H variants. This purchase did not go ahead, as the government instead ordered a fifth Boeing C-17 Globemaster III.

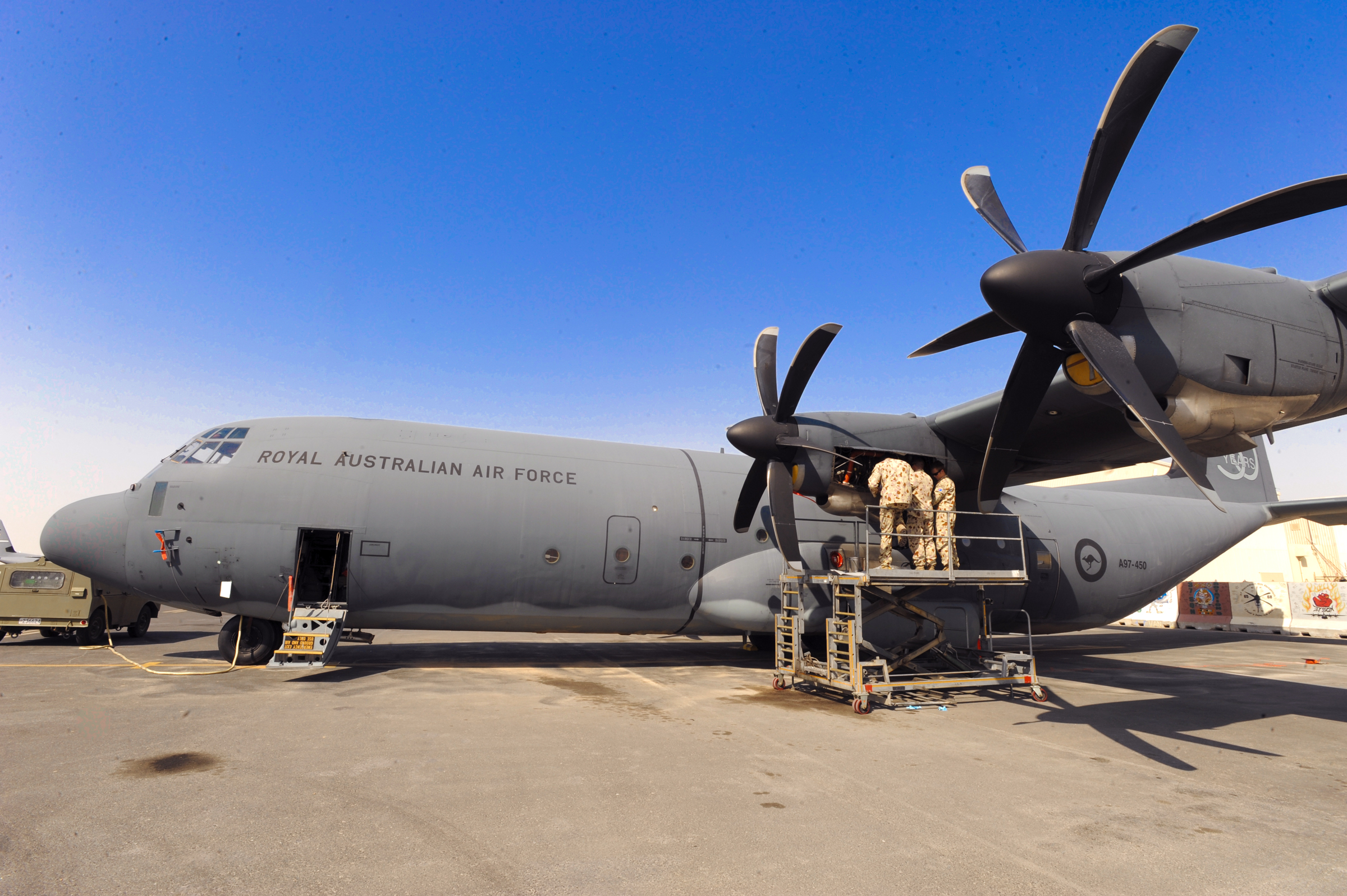
RAAF personnel undertaking preventive maintenance on a C-130J in the Middle East during January 2009

The C-130Js have been updated since entering service. All of the aircraft were fitted with radar warning receivers by the end of 2012, and it is planned to equip the Hercules with Large Aircraft Infrared Countermeasures systems by 2016. As of 2015, the Hercules' communications capabilities were also to be updated by fitting the aircraft with satellite communications equipment and the equipment necessary to allow them to use the Link 16 data exchange network. At this time the C-130s were also to be fitted with new high-speed airdrop ramps at the rear of their cabin, and will be cleared to drop larger loads. The C-130J's operating software has also been upgraded over time, leading to improved performance. The RAAF is participating in the development of further software enhancements. During 2016 all of the C-130Js were fitted with advanced satellite communications systems that allowed the aircraft, and embarked troops, to be retasked while in flight. As part of this modification the aircraft were fitted with an additional crew station, and they carry a fourth crew member when necessary to handle complex communications tasks. In 2019 the RAAF was reported to be considering fitting Litening targeting pods to Hercules to improve crew situational awareness and allow aircraft to collect imagery as part of transport flights. Flight trials of a Hercules fitted with a Litening targeting pod began in early 2020 and were continuing in 2022, one of the C-130Js being modified to carry a variety of systems as part of the trial.

In March 2015 Australian Aviation reported that, as part of the process of developing a new Defence White Paper, the Australian Government was considering purchasing two LC-130J Hercules fitted with landing skis and other equipment needed to allow the aircraft to operate in Antarctica. Such an acquisition would have supported the Australian Antarctic Division's operations following the closure of the Wilkins Runway near Casey Station. The 2016 Defence White Paper stated that the Hercules fleet would be maintained at twelve upgraded C-130J aircraft. A C-130J flew from Australia to Antarctica in February 2020, the first time a RAAF Hercules had done so since 1983.

The ADF's 2020 Force Structure Plan identified a need to replace the C-130J Hercules with an expanded fleet of transport aircraft. In 2021 the RAAF requested information from Lockheed Martin about how it could supply 24 new C-130J-30s as well as six KC-130J aerial refuelling variants. The RAAF also approached Airbus, Embraer and Kawasaki for information about the transport aircraft each company produces. On 1 November 2022 the Department of Defence announced that, after evaluating a range of designs, it had concluded that only an expanded fleet of newly built C-130Js would meet the RAAF's needs. The variant selected is the C-130J-30, which is 4 metres (13 ft) longer than the standard C-130J and is the variant currently in RAAF service. Approval was to be sought from the government in 2023 for this purchase, up to 24 C-130Js potentially being acquired. Ahead of Australian Government approval, the US State Department agreed to the potential sale of up to 24 C-130Js and associated equipment to Australia in November 2022. The Australian Defence Business Review reported that this acquisition may also be used to replace the RAAF's fleet of Alenia C-27J Spartans. In July 2023 the government announced that 20 C-130Js would be ordered to replace the current Hercules fleet. The first of the new C-130s is scheduled to be delivered in 2027.

== Operational service ==
=== Introduction into service ===
The RAAF's twelve C-130As were picked up by their newly trained Australian pilots from the Lockheed factory at Dobbins Air Force Base, Georgia, and ferried to Australia in three groups between December 1958 and March 1959. No. 36 Squadron, located at RAAF Base Richmond, became the first unit to operate the new aircraft. Almost immediately they established regular courier services within Australia and to RAAF Base Butterworth in Malaya. These flights primarily involved transporting cargo, as Chief of the Air Staff Frederick Scherger directed in 1959 that the RAAF would continue to rely on chartered civil airliners to move military personnel on the grounds that these aircraft were better suited to the task and in wartime all the C-130s would be needed to supply troops near the front lines. In February 1960 a Hercules flew the RAAF's first AIM-9 Sidewinder missiles from the United States to Butterworth to equip the CAC Sabre fighters based there. Crew training was rigorous, and from mid-1960 involved the use of a simulator. Only seasoned transport pilots flew the Hercules in its early years of service, generally having undertaken a tour of duty with No. 38 Squadron's Dakotas. The official history of the post-war Air Force described the Hercules as "probably the biggest step-up in aircraft capabilities" the RAAF had ever received, considering it roughly four times as effective as the Dakota, taking into account the improvements in payload, range, and speed. When No. 78 (Fighter) Wing and its two squadrons of CAC Sabres deployed to Butterworth between October 1958 and February 1959, seven Dakotas were required to ferry the staff and equipment of No. 3 Squadron from Australia to Malaya, compared to two Hercules for No. 77 Squadron. The Hercules were the first turboprop aircraft operated by the RAAF. They were serviced by No. 486 Maintenance Squadron, deeper maintenance and upgrades being carried out by No. 2 Aircraft Depot (No. 2 AD), both units being based at Richmond. The availability of spare parts from the US caused problems early on, grounding one C-130A for almost a year.

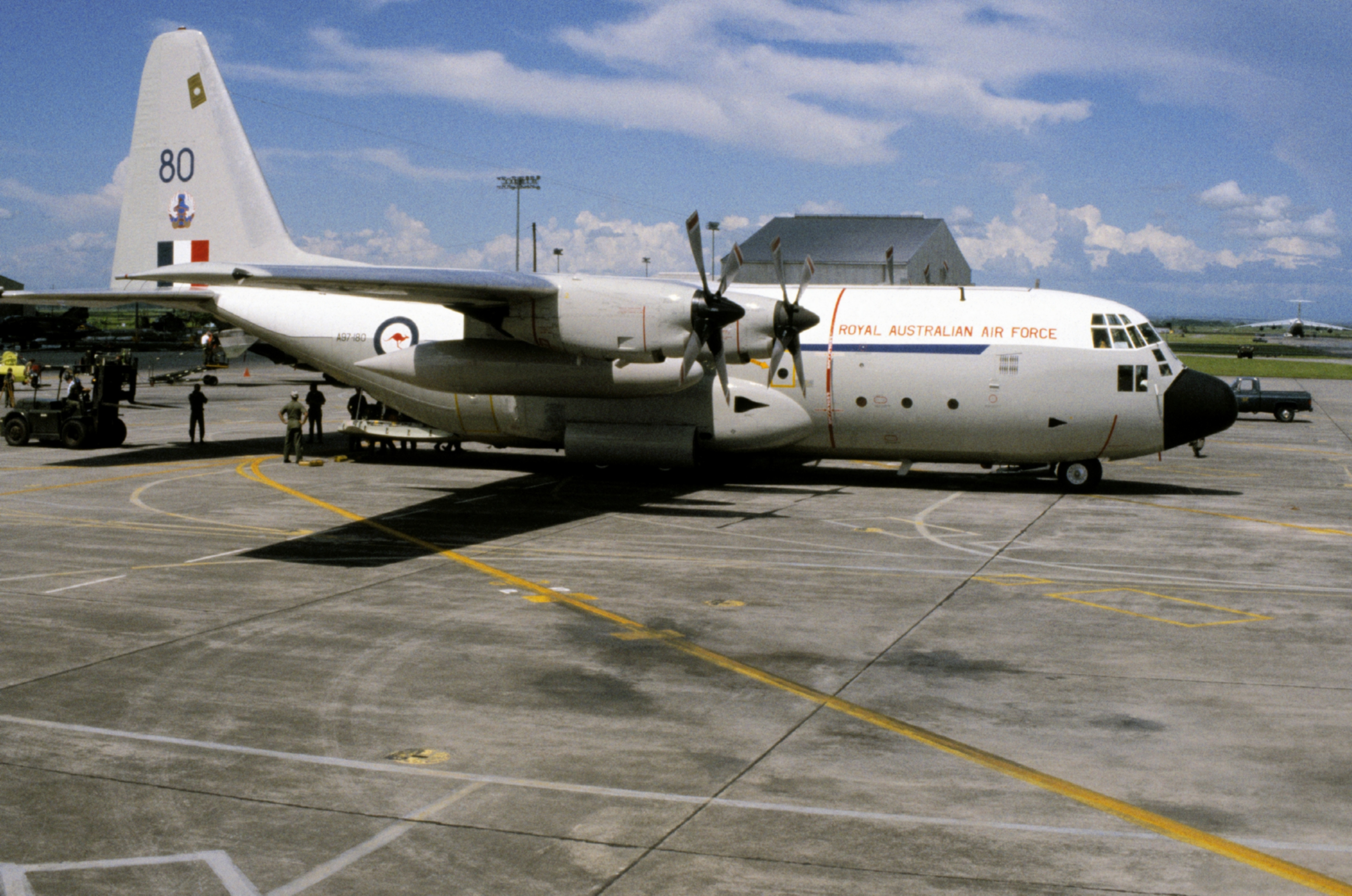
C-130E of No. 37 Squadron at Clark Air Base, Philippines, November 1981

No. 36 Squadron commenced parachute trials with the Hercules in September 1960. Beginning in May 1962, RAAF forces based at Ubon, Thailand, under SEATO arrangements were supplied by a regular Hercules service. In December that year, the Hercules made their first troop-carrying flights into a combat zone, when one of No. 36 Squadron's C-130s joined a Commonwealth airlift from Singapore to Borneo at the commencement of the Konfrontasi between Indonesia and Malaysia; similar missions would be undertaken for a further five years. In 1964, the first two Dassault Mirage III fighters to be assembled in Australia were flown in pieces from France to the Government Aircraft Factories at Avalon, Victoria, by RAAF Hercules. The same year, following the entry into Australian service of the de Havilland Canada DHC-4 Caribou with No. 38 Squadron, No. 486 Squadron was disbanded and its equipment and staff divided between Nos. 36 and 38 Squadrons. The RAAF's force of twelve C-130A Hercules was augmented by twelve C-130Es commencing in August 1966. No. 37 Squadron, disbanded in 1948, was re-formed at Richmond to operate the new models. No. 486 Squadron was also re-formed to provide maintenance for both Hercules squadrons. No. 36 Squadron's tasking was mainly domestic and tactical in nature; No. 37 Squadron's was overseas and strategic, owing to the longer range of its C-130Es. In May 1967, three Hercules of No. 37 Squadron supported Operation Fast Caravan, the deployment of 23 Mirages of No. 75 Squadron to Butterworth.

=== Vietnam War era ===
During the late 1960s, forty-two per cent of Hercules flying hours were devoted to Australian Army operations. The C-130s undertook long-range missions to support Australian forces fighting in the Vietnam War from 1965 until 1972. Following the deployment of the 1st Battalion, Royal Australian Regiment to South Vietnam in early 1965, the RAAF began fortnightly C-130 flights into the country from June that year. These flights were initially conducted by C-130As, and carried high-priority cargo and passengers from Richmond to Vung Tau in South Vietnam via either Butterworth or Singapore. The scale of the supply flights into South Vietnam expanded in 1967 when No. 2 Squadron RAAF, which was equipped with English Electric Canberra bombers, was deployed to Phan Rang. A large airlift codenamed Winter Grip was also conducted in mid-1967 to replace two Australian Army battalions, which had completed their year-long tour of duty, with a pair of fresh battalions. The Hercules were called upon to support the withdrawal of the 1st Australian Task Force (1 ATF) from South Vietnam, and Nos. 36 and 37 Squadrons undertook many sorties to fly equipment and personnel out of the country during 1971. In late 1972, C-130s were used to withdraw the last remaining Australian force in South Vietnam, the Australian Army Training Team Vietnam; the final elements of this force departed aboard two Hercules on 20 December 1972.

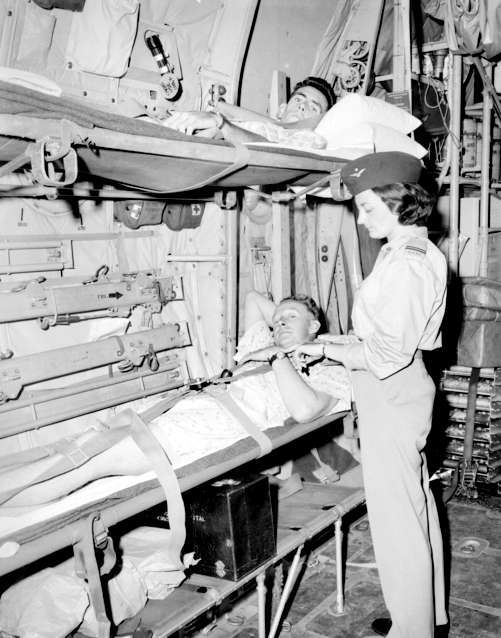
RAAF nurse tending injured personnel aboard a C-130A during an aeromedical evacuation flight out of South Vietnam in 1966

As well as transport operations, the Hercules flew many evacuation flights out of Vietnam to transfer wounded or sick personnel to Australia, via Butterworth, for further treatment. These flights were initially conducted as part of the regular courier service, and the patients and RAAF nurses had to endure uncomfortable conditions as the aircraft had only rudimentary facilities for personnel on stretchers. Separate evacuation flights began on 1 July 1966, and continued at fortnightly intervals until 1972; more flights were made during periods in which 1 ATF suffered heavy casualties. Although the operation was generally successful, only C-130Es were assigned to this task from May 1967 after an article criticising the use of noisy C-130As to transport wounded personnel was published in The Medical Journal of Australia. The C-130Es provided much more comfortable conditions and were capable of flying directly between South Vietnam and Australia when required. A total of 3,164 patients had been transported to Australia by the time the C-130 evacuation flights ended in early 1972. The Hercules also returned the bodies of servicemen killed in Vietnam to Australia.

Many of the RAAF's C-130s were redeployed to South Vietnam shortly before the end of the war in 1975. The rapid North Vietnamese advance during the Spring Offensive displaced hundreds of thousands of South Vietnamese civilians, and the Australian Government deployed a detachment of Hercules to Saigon in March 1975 as part of an international aid effort coordinated by the United States. This force, which was designated Detachment S, had an average strength of seven C-130s and about one hundred air and ground crew, and was initially used to transport civilian refugees away from the front lines. After South Vietnamese soldiers were reported to have been transported alongside civilians, Prime Minister Gough Whitlam directed that the Hercules were to only carry humanitarian cargo. As the North Vietnamese advanced on Saigon, Detachment S was moved to Bangkok in Thailand, but continued to fly into South Vietnam each day. Overall, Detachment S had carried 1,100 refugees and 900 tonnes of supplies by the end of the war. On 4 and 17 April, aircraft of the detachment flew 271 orphaned children to Bangkok as part of the US-led Operation Babylift. In late April, two of No. 37 Squadron's C-130Es were assigned to the United Nations to transport supplies throughout Southeast Asia; this force was designated Detachment N. The C-130Es began operations on 3 May, and were mainly used to fly supplies into Laos. The aircraft transported cargo between Thailand, Butterworth, Hong Kong and Singapore; by the time this mission ended in early June, the two Hercules had conducted 91 sorties for the UN. Aircraft of Detachment S evacuated Australian embassy personnel from Phnom Penh in Cambodia, as well as Saigon, shortly before they fell to Khmer Rouge and North Vietnamese forces in April 1975, after which the force returned to Australia. Detachment N also evacuated the Australian embassy in Vientiane, Laos, during early June 1975.

=== Post-Vietnam tasks ===
In the years after the end of the Vietnam War, the Hercules continued to take part in military exercises and support overseas peacekeeping commitments. They also became well known in the Southern Pacific after being called on for relief following natural disasters, including tsunami in New Guinea, cyclones in the Solomon Islands and Tonga, and fires and floods in Australia. The Hercules played a significant part in the evacuation of civilians following Cyclone Tracy in 1974–75; a No. 37 Squadron C-130E was the first aircraft to touch down in Darwin following the disaster. Eight of No. 36 Squadron's aircraft were involved in the relief effort, flying over 550 hours, and carrying 2,864 passengers and almost 800,000 lbs of cargo; No. 37 Squadron contributed 11 aircraft, flying 700 hours, and carrying 4,400 passengers and 1,300,000 lbs of cargo. On 19 January 1978 a C-130E returning to Australia from Butterworth was used to intercept a drug-smuggling aircraft near Darwin; the smuggler eventually landed at Katherine, and was arrested. After clocking up 147,000 accident-free flying hours over the course of 20 years, No. 36 Squadron's C-130As were replaced in 1978 by C-130H models. The C-130Hs were primarily used as tactical air lifters throughout their service with the RAAF, and worked closely with the Army's special forces units.

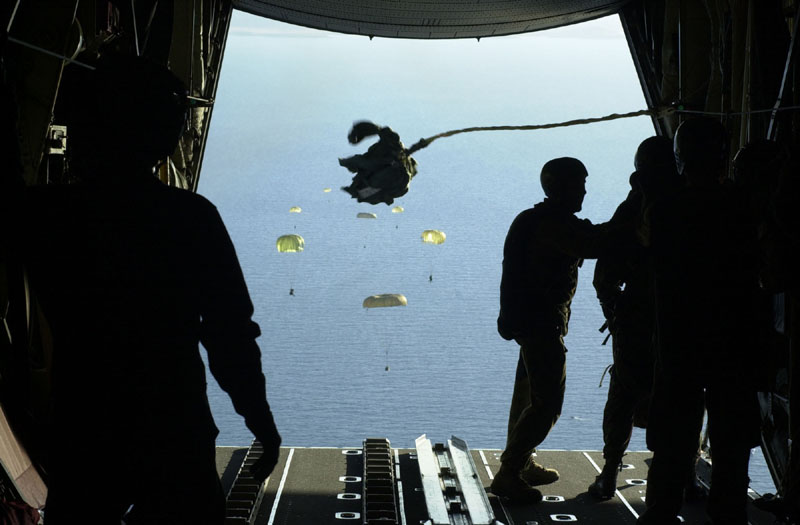
Soldiers from the 1st Commando Company parachuting with inflatable boats from an RAAF C-130H into Shoalwater Bay, May 2001

The disposal of the C-130As took almost a decade, the process being subject to a police investigation. Attempts to sell the Hercules by tender during 1978 and 1979 were unsuccessful, and the American law firm Ford and Vlahos was appointed the sales agent for the aircraft in 1981. One was sold to the French Government in 1983 and subsequently transferred to the Chadian Air Force. Another two Hercules were sold to the Colombian charter company Aviaco in 1983, but the US State Department vetoed the deal shortly before it was to have been completed over suspicions that the aircraft would be used to smuggle drugs into the United States. A C-130A was transferred to the newly established company International Air Aid and leased to the International Red Cross to fly humanitarian supplies into Ethiopia during 1986, but this contract was cancelled after the C-130's pilot was accused by the Ethiopian government of photographing a military area. The Australian Federal Police eventually charged two people with defrauding the Commonwealth and conspiracy in relation to these attempts to dispose of the C-130As. Eventually, four of the C-130As were sold to Aboitiz Air Transport Corporation in May 1988 and another four were acquired by the Fowler Aeronautical Corporation the next year. Two of the remaining three aircraft were retained by the RAAF for training and heritage purposes, and the final C-130A was scrapped.

In November 1978, a C-130H became the first Australian Hercules to land in Antarctica, at McMurdo Sound. In January–February 1979, two No. 37 Squadron C-130Es evacuated Australian and other foreign embassy staff from Tehran, shortly before the collapse of royal rule during the Iranian Revolution. During April 1982, a C-130H was fitted with aerial firefighting equipment acquired from the United States Forest Service for trials purposes; several Hercules later used this equipment to fight bushfires. On 5 April 1983, 23 of the RAAF's Hercules performed a formation flight over Sydney; the remaining aircraft was to have participated in this flight but was diverted to conduct a search-and-rescue task. The Hercules' twelve-hour endurance and ability to drop survival equipment over land or sea made it a useful aircraft for such missions. In 1986, No. 37 Squadron transported the Popemobiles during John Paul II's tour of Australia; its other unusual cargoes have included a Murray Grey stud bull presented to the Chinese Government in 1973, kangaroos and sheep for Malaysia, and archaeological exhibits from China.

In February 1987, Nos. 36 and 37 Squadrons joined No. 33 Squadron (flying Boeing 707 tanker-transports) as part of a re-formed No. 86 Wing under the newly established Air Lift Group (renamed Air Mobility Group in April 2014). In May that year four C-130s flew a rifle company of the 1st Battalion, Royal Australian Regiment, from Townsville to Norfolk Island during Operation Morris Dance, the Australian Defence Force's response to the first of the 1987 Fijian coups; the soldiers subsequently embarked onto RAN warships by helicopter. In 1988, No. 37 Squadron's Hercules achieved 200,000 accident-free flying hours. No. 36 Squadron achieved 100,000 accident-free flying hours on the C-130H in 1990. Members of the travelling public experienced flying by Hercules in 1989, when the Australian Government employed the C-130s and 707s for transport during the pilots' dispute that curtailed operations by the two domestic airlines; the resulting spike in operational hours necessitated No. 486 Squadron sending detachments to several locations throughout the country to cope with increased maintenance demands. By the late 1980s, some C-130 maintenance tasks had been outsourced to commercial firms, and Air New Zealand won a four-year depot maintenance contract in 1990. In 1990, three No. 36 Squadron female pilots were employed for the first time in combat-related roles following the removal of the restriction against women in combat-related roles by the Australian Defence Force.

Following the Iraqi invasion of Kuwait in August 1990, No. 86 Wing prepared to deploy five C-130s to the Middle East to evacuate 3,000 Australian citizens from Saudi Arabia in the event that Iraq also attacked that country. An operation to fly about 95 Australians and New Zealanders directly out of Iraq and Kuwait was also planned, but would have only been conducted as a last resort due to the great dangers involved. These evacuation flights were not required as Iraq did not invade Saudi Arabia, and the Australians in Iraq departed by road. A proposal to deploy some of the Hercules as part of Australia's contribution to the ensuing Gulf War was also rejected in late 1990 as the aircraft had to be held in reserve in case fighting on the Pacific island of Bougainville worsened and required an evacuation operation. After Operation Desert Storm commenced in January 1991, two C-130s were dispatched to the Cocos (Keeling) Islands in the Indian Ocean where they were held at readiness to deploy to Saudi Arabia in case Australian citizens had to be evacuated; these aircraft moved to Singapore on 29 January and returned to Australia in early February. Other Hercules flew supplies for the RAN warships in the region from Australia to Muscat, Oman, from January 1991, and also transported a naval Clearance Diving Team to Muscat late in the month. In 1992, the Hercules of Nos. 36 and 37 Squadrons achieved a grand total of 500,000 accident-free flying hours; Lockheed presented No. 86 Wing with a trophy to commemorate the milestone.

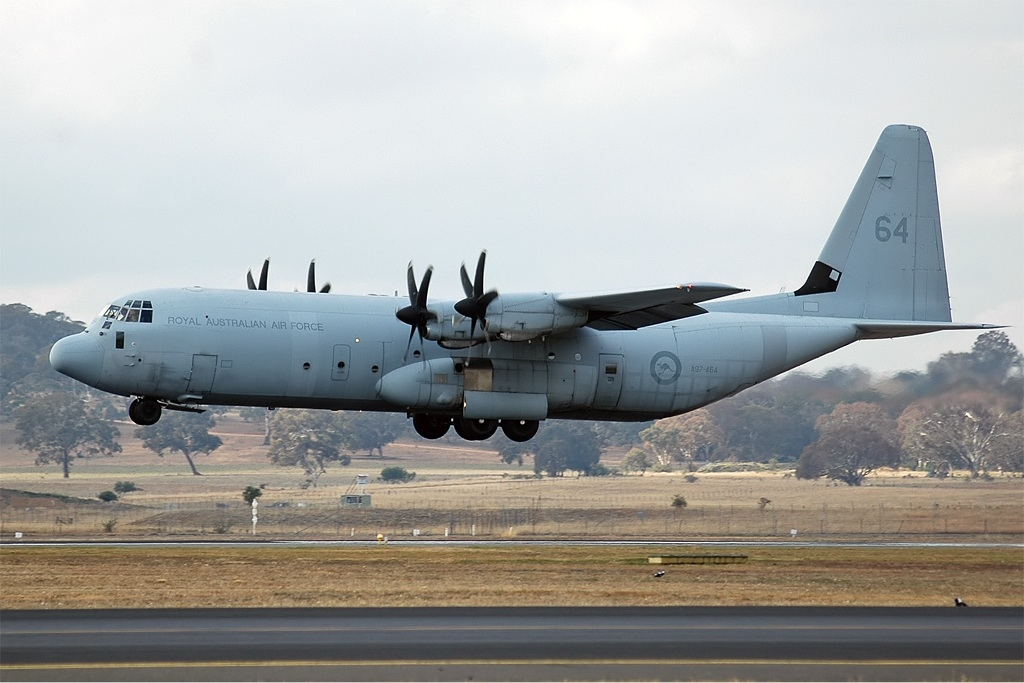
RAAF C-130J, Canberra, 2005

The RAAF's Hercules fleet continued to support Australian military deployments during the 1990s and 2000s. In 1993, C-130s transported Australian troops to and from Somalia as part of Operation Solace. In late July the next year two C-130Hs flew water purifying equipment and medical supplies into Rwanda to assist the survivors of the genocide in that country. Six Hercules evacuated over 450 civilians from Cambodia following the coup in July 1997. No. 37 Squadron re-equipped with new-model C-130J Hercules in 1999; during the transition to the new aircraft the C-130Es were operated by No. 36 Squadron before being retired. The seven C-130Es transferred to Lockheed Martin as part of the C-130J purchase agreement were subsequently sold to Pakistan in 2004. Of these aircraft, six entered service with the Pakistan Air Force and the seventh was scrapped. The RAAF's other five C-130Es were retained to be used for ground training and museum purposes. At the end of 1999, No. 86 Wing ceased flying the regularly scheduled intra-Australia C-130 flights that had begun in May 1959. Although these courier flights had been one of the main tasks assigned to the Hercules force since the type's introduction, the reduction in commercial airfares during the late 1990s rendered them unnecessary.

A detachment of Hercules from Nos. 36 and 37 Squadrons supported INTERFET operations in East Timor between September 1999 and February 2000. When violence broke out following the East Timor Special Autonomy Referendum on 30 August 1999, C-130H sorties were flown into the then-Indonesian province from 6 to 14 September to evacuate United Nations personnel as well as other foreign citizens and East Timorese refugees. Four C-130E sorties were also conducted to drop food and other humanitarian supplies to refugees on 17 and 18 September. On 19 September a C-130 dropped a Special Air Service Regiment (SAS) team near the East Timorese capital of Dili ahead of the arrival of the main INTERFET force the next day. From 20 September, thirteen RAAF Hercules (designated No. 86 Wing Detachment B) and transport aircraft from several other countries flew troops and supplies into East Timor. These aircraft also dropped humanitarian supplies to refugees who had fled to mountainous regions. The poor condition of most East Timorese airfields and the potential threat of being fired upon by pro-Indonesian militia were constant dangers throughout this operation.

The support arrangements for the RAAF's Hercules were reformed during 1999 and 2000. On 24 August 1999, the training sections of Nos. 33, 36 and 37 Squadrons and No. 503 Wing were combined to form No. 285 Squadron. This new squadron was assigned responsibility for training aircrew to operate C-130s and Boeing 707s using flight simulators, as well as aircraft temporarily assigned to the unit from the operational squadrons. Retired Hercules have also been used to train loadmasters. In May 2000, heavy maintenance of the C-130s, previously carried out by No. 2 AD (reformed as No. 503 Wing in July 1992) was contracted out to Qantas. Since the retirement of the Boeing 707 from RAAF service in June 2008, No. 285 Squadron has been dedicated to C-130 training.

=== Iraq War and later operations ===
From late 2001, Hercules began flying into Afghanistan to support the SAS squadron deployed as part of Operation Slipper, Australia's contribution to the War in Afghanistan. Five Hercules of Nos. 36 and 37 Squadrons joined relief efforts following the Bali Bombings in October 2002. In February 2003, a detachment of Hercules from No. 36 Squadron was deployed to the Middle East as part of the Australian contribution to the invasion of Iraq. These aircraft arrived on 10 February, and began flying transport sorties twelve days later. The C-130s were the main form of transport used to move Australian personnel and equipment in the theatre before and after the outbreak of fighting on 19 March. During the invasion the Hercules supported SAS operations in western Iraq, one being the first Coalition aircraft to land at Al Asad Airbase after it was secured by special forces personnel on 12 April. The C-130s transported supplies and equipment to airstrips in southern Iraq to support the operations of US and British forces. As the first phase of the war wound down, Australian Hercules flew medical supplies into Baghdad shortly after the city was captured. A rotating detachment of three Hercules was subsequently maintained in the Middle East to support the ongoing Australian contribution to the War in Afghanistan, as well as the forces stationed in Iraq. The aircraft assigned to this detachment amassed a total of 20,000 operational flying hours by March 2010. An American contractor travelling on an Australian C-130 in Iraq was killed on 27 June 2004 when the aircraft was struck by gunfire shortly after it took off from Baghdad.

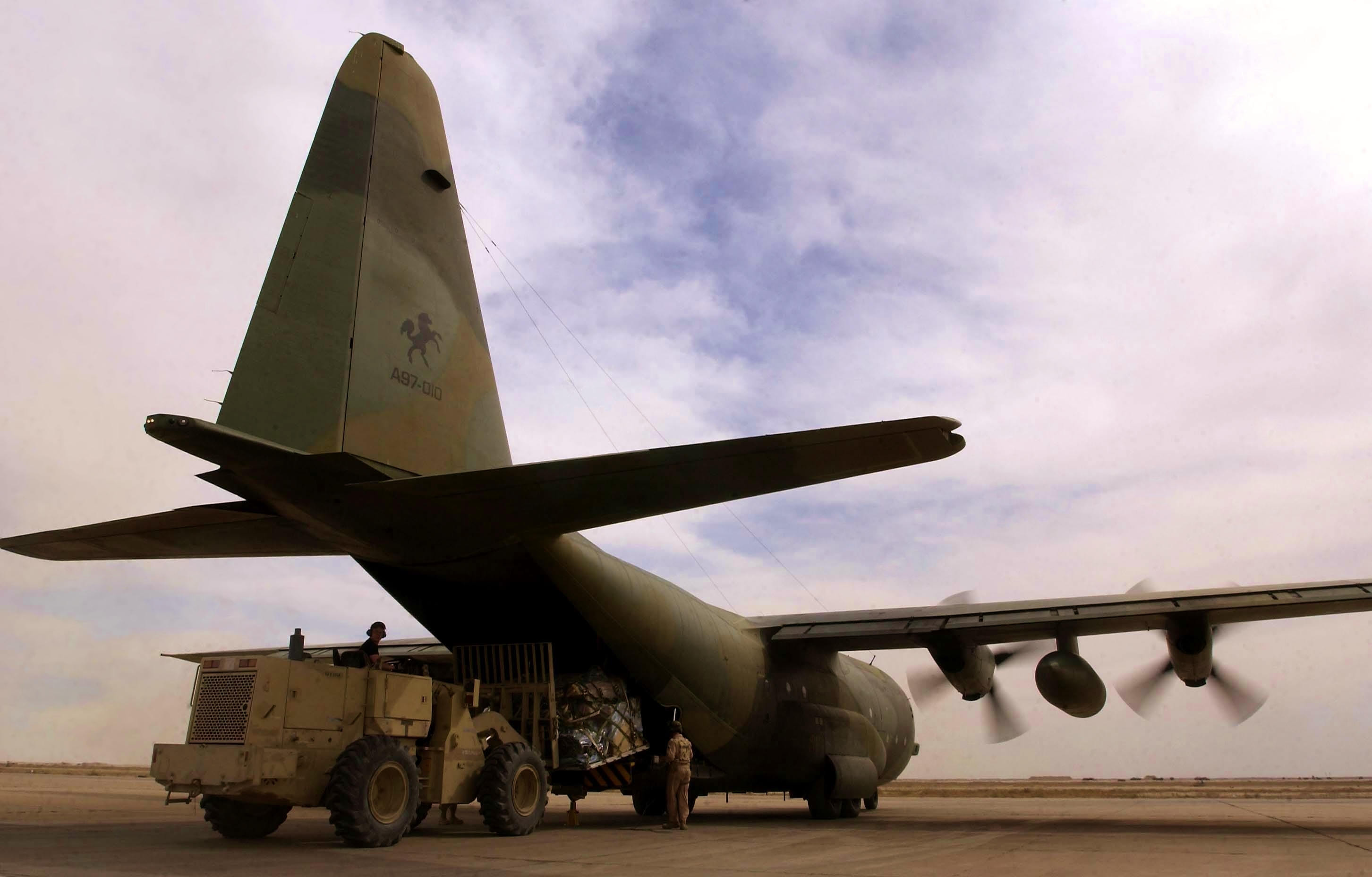
RAAF C-130H being unloaded at Tallil Air Base, Iraq, in April 2003

RAAF C-130s continued to support operations in and around Australia during the early 2000s. During April 2003 a C-130 formed part of the force that tracked the North Korean freighter Pong Su before it was boarded by special forces personnel off the coast of New South Wales. No. 37 Squadron Super Hercules & No. 36 Squadron Hercules took part in Operation Sumatra Assist in the wake of the 2004 Boxing Day tsunami; the aircraft were initially used to fly supplies into the badly damaged city of Banda Aceh. Hercules flew Australian forces into East Timor during May 2006 after the government of that country requested assistance to quell a military mutiny and widespread violence. In July that year one of the C-130s deployed to the Middle East was sent to Cyprus, where it picked up Australians who had been evacuated from Lebanon following Israeli air raids and flew them to Turkey.

RAAF C-130 operations were concentrated in No. 37 Squadron in November 2006, when No. 36 Squadron transferred its C-130Hs before re-equipping with Boeing C-17 Globemaster heavy transports and relocating to RAAF Base Amberley, Queensland. The RAAF's contribution to Operation Papua New Guinea Assist following Cyclone Guba in November 2007 included two Hercules, three Caribous, and a Globemaster. In November 2008, the RAAF commemorated fifty years of Hercules operation. From that year only C-130Js were deployed to the Middle East. Four of the C-130Hs were placed in reserve at Richmond from 2009. Together with Globemasters, Hercules transported medical staff and equipment to aid victims of the Christchurch earthquake in February 2011. In May 2012 the government announced as part of the 2012–13 Budget that the remaining eight C-130Hs would be withdrawn from service a year earlier than previously scheduled. The aircraft were retired on 30 November that year. Two of the C-130Hs were retained by the Air Force for display at RAAF Museum and for ground training purposes at Richmond; four were donated to the Indonesian Air Force, and the RAAF was reported to be considering options for the disposal of the other six. By the time the C-130H fleet was retired, the twelve aircraft had flown almost 250,000 hours. In April 2013 the Australian government offered to sell five of the C-130Hs as well as spare parts and simulators to Indonesia at below their market value. The Indonesian government accepted this deal, and it was finalised on 26 July 2013. The RAAF celebrated 800,000 Hercules flying hours in September 2014. The C-130Js had by this time accumulated over 100,000 hours. The C-130J fleet achieved 170,000 flying hours in November 2025.
