= Boeing C-17 Globemaster III in Australian service =

History of the C-17 Globemaster III transport aircraft used by Australia

C-17 Globemaster III
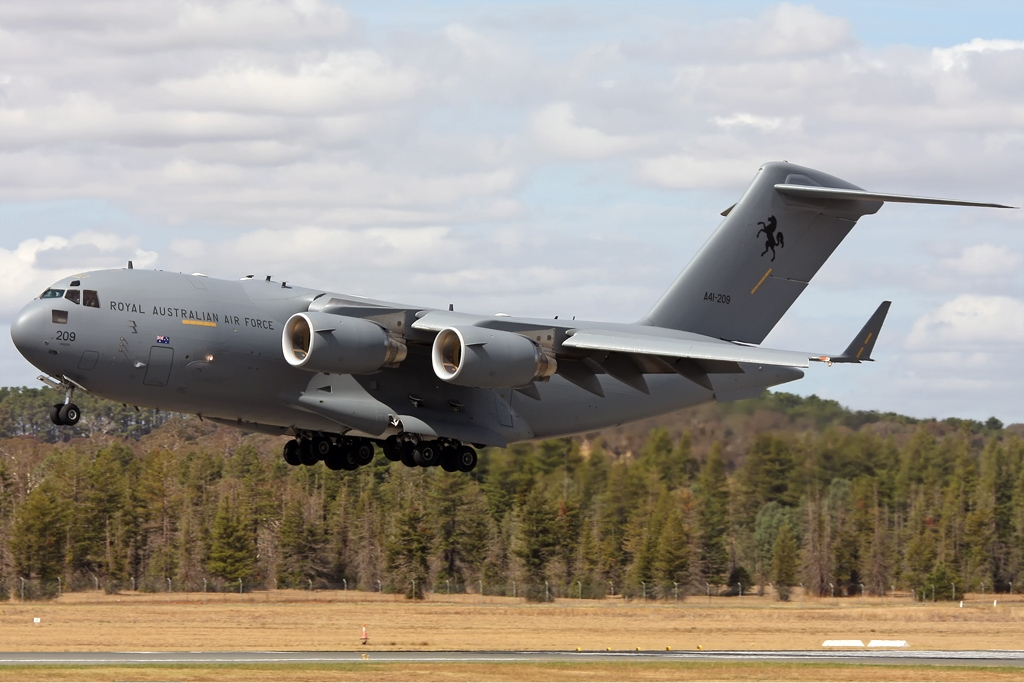
- C-17 Globemaster A41-209 at Canberra Airport

General information
- Type: Military transport aircraft
- Manufacturer: Boeing
- Primary user: Royal Australian Air Force
- Serial: A41-206 to A41-213

History
- In service: 2006–current

The Royal Australian Air Force (RAAF) operates eight Boeing C-17 Globemaster III large transport aircraft. Four C-17s were ordered in mid-2006 to improve the ability of the Australian Defence Force (ADF) to operate outside Australia and its region. The aircraft entered service between November 2006 and January 2008, the second pair being delivered ahead of schedule. Two more Globemasters were ordered in 2011, the sixth being delivered to the RAAF in November 2012. Another two C-17s were ordered in October 2014, with the final aircraft being delivered in November 2015. The Globemasters are built to the same specifications as those operated by the United States Air Force (USAF), and the Australian aircraft are maintained through an international contract with Boeing.

All of the RAAF's Globemasters are assigned to No. 36 Squadron and are based at RAAF Base Amberley in Queensland. The aircraft have supported ADF operations in Afghanistan, Iraq and other locations in the Middle East, as well as training exercises in Australia and the United States. They have also transported supplies and personnel as part of relief efforts following natural disasters in Australia, Japan, New Zealand and several other countries. The C-17s are highly regarded throughout the Australian military for their ability to carry large amounts of cargo across long distances, and the process through which they were acquired has been identified as an example of good practice in defence procurement.

== Acquisition ==
=== Selection ===
The RAAF began considering options for heavy transport aircraft to provide a strategic airlift capability during the early 2000s. This investigation was initiated after the ADF deployment to East Timor in 1999 and operations in the Middle East from 2001 revealed shortcomings in the RAAF's ability to transport the increasingly large and heavy vehicles and other items of equipment used by the Australian Army. To support these operations, the ADF found that it needed long-range aircraft capable of carrying larger loads than could be accommodated in the RAAF's force of Lockheed C-130 Hercules transports. As a result of this capability gap, the ADF needed to use USAF transports and chartered Russian-built commercial heavy lift aircraft to move supplies and equipment from Australia to its forces in Afghanistan and the Middle East. This experience proved frustrating, as both categories of aircraft were often not available and the commercial transports were expensive to lease. The crash of a civil-chartered Ilyushin Il-76 in East Timor in 2003 also raised concerns within the ADF about the safety of the Russian transport aircraft. Following advocacy from the military, the Australian Government announced as part of an update to its national security strategy in December 2005 that it would consider acquiring heavy lift aircraft to supplement the RAAF's Lockheed Martin C-130J Super Hercules transports. This initiative was one of several measures announced in the government's Defence Update 2005 paper, which sought to better prepare the ADF to operate in locations distant from Australia.

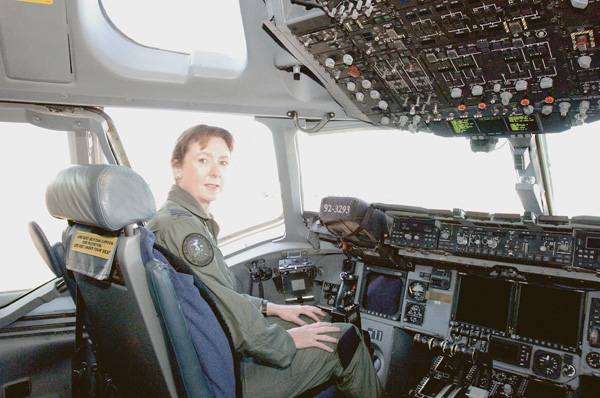
Wing Commander Linda Corbould, who oversaw the RAAF's program to accept the C-17, preparing for a training sortie in a USAF Globemaster. Corbould was also the commanding officer of No. 36 Squadron during its initial period of C-17 operations.

In early 2006 a project office was established within the Defence Materiel Organisation (DMO) to evaluate the options for acquiring heavy lift aircraft. The office considered the Boeing C-17 Globemaster III, which was in service with the USAF at the time, as well as the Airbus A400M Atlas, which was yet to make its first flight. Boeing aggressively marketed the C-17 to the Australian Government during this period. Though unstated, commonality with the USAF and the United Kingdom's RAF was also considered advantageous. In March 2006, Minister for Defence Brendan Nelson announced that the government had decided to purchase three C-17s and take out an option for a fourth. Nelson also announced that the C-17s would be operated by No. 36 Squadron RAAF, which was to transfer its C-130H Hercules to No. 37 Squadron and relocate from RAAF Base Richmond in New South Wales to RAAF Base Amberley in Queensland. Amberley was selected over Richmond as the base for the Globemasters as its runways and engineering facilities were better able to support large aircraft.

The government exercised the option to purchase a fourth C-17 between the time this announcement was made and the signing of the final contract on 31 July 2006. The total cost of the four aircraft was $A821 million, and Boeing also received an A$85 million contract to allow Australia to join the "virtual fleet" global C-17 sustainment program. Additional funding was allocated to build headquarters and maintenance facilities at Amberley as well as to upgrade the air movements facilities at RAAF Bases Darwin, Edinburgh, Townsville, and Pearce. The package of funding needed to purchase and introduce the Globemasters into service was provided as a supplement to the government's long-term defence funding program, so the ADF did not have to forgo any other planned capabilities. The C-17s were acquired through the United States Government's Foreign Military Sales program, meaning that they were first delivered to the USAF and then transferred to the RAAF. The USAF provided some of the C-17 delivery "slots" it had purchased to the RAAF to enable the type to rapidly enter Australian service, making them identical to American C-17, even in paint scheme, the only difference being the national markings. This allowed delivery to commence within nine months of commitment to the program.

=== Delivery and sustainment ===
The RAAF received its first four C-17s between late 2006 and early 2008. The initial aircraft, which was allocated the serial number A41-206, was completed in October 2006 and arrived in Australia on 4 December that year. A welcome ceremony attended by Prime Minister John Howard, Nelson and other dignitaries was held at Defence Establishment Fairbairn in Canberra. The second aircraft, A41-207, was delivered on 11 May 2007. A41-208 was handed over to the RAAF on 18 December 2007, and A41-209 was accepted on 18 January 2008. The first two aircraft were delivered in accordance with the expected schedule, and the third and fourth were each delivered two months early. The RAAF also acquired a C-17 flight simulator, which entered service in January 2010. In the 2012–2013 edition of its annual Major Projects Report, the Australian National Audit Office judged that a lesson for the Australian Government from the successful procurement of the first four Globemasters was that purchasing major equipment on an "off-the-shelf" basis allows "considerable acceleration of the standard acquisition cycle". Similarly, Australian Strategic Policy Institute analyst Mark Thomson wrote in 2008 that "the breakneck speed with which the C-17 acquisition was executed (and the good outcomes of the acquisition) provides an example of what can be achieved" through off-the-shelf purchasing, and that such projects generally deliver better outcomes for the ADF than attempts to develop equipment tailored to Australia's needs.

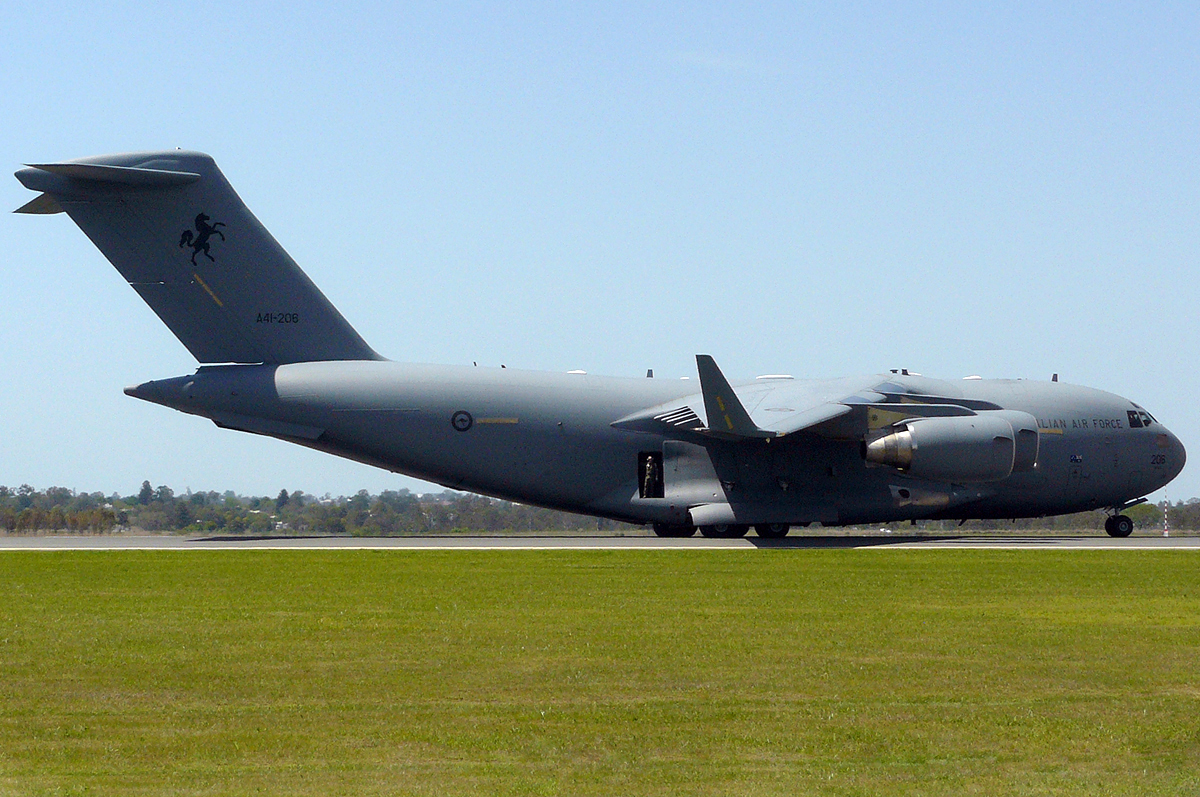
A41-206, the RAAF's first C-17, in 2008

The Australian Government ordered a further two C-17s during 2011 and 2012. In February 2011 Minister for Defence Stephen Smith announced that another C-17 would be purchased for a cost of $A130 million. This aircraft was ordered to prevent a shortfall of airlift capacity while the original four C-17s underwent scheduled heavy maintenance. The decision to purchase this aircraft also supplanted an earlier plan to acquire two more C-130Js. As the deadline for A41-206 to be temporarily taken out of service for maintenance was rapidly approaching, the USAF agreed to transfer a C-17 airframe that was nearing completion to the RAAF. This aircraft was delivered on 14 September 2011 and arrived in Australia nine days later. At the ceremony held to welcome A41-210, Smith announced that the government intended to order another C-17. The $A160 million contract for this aircraft was signed in March 2012, and it was delivered to the RAAF on 1 November that year. Funding for these two aircraft was obtained through a combination of supplements to the Defence budget and reallocating unspent funds from ADF projects running behind schedule.

Owing to budget constraints and the scheduled closure of Boeing's Globemaster production line in 2015, it was considered unlikely in 2012 that the RAAF would acquire more Globemasters. However, in August 2014 Minister for Defence David Johnston stated that the Government was likely to purchase a further one or two C-17s. The Government announced that it would purchase two Globemasters in October 2014, and requested information on the pricing and availability for a further pair of aircraft. In November 2014 Australia lodged a formal request with the United States Defense Security Cooperation Agency for four C-17s and associated equipment, for a total cost of $A1.85 billion. An order for the RAAF's seventh and eighth Globemasters was formally announced by Prime Minister Tony Abbott on 10 April 2015. The first of the new C-17s arrived in Australia on 29 July 2015, and the second on 4 November that year. These two aircraft were among the last C-17s to have been built before the production line was closed, and it is not expected that the RAAF will acquire more Globemasters. It was reported in December 2014 that the New Zealand Government was considering purchasing between two and four Globemasters, and Australian Aviation journalist Andrew McLaughlin suggested that any such acquisition would build on Australia's C-17 support infrastructure. The New Zealand Government ultimately decided to not purchase any Globemasters.

Maintenance of the Australian Globemasters is undertaken by both the RAAF and Boeing. As part of Australia's membership of the Globemaster III Sustainment Partnership, Air Force technicians are responsible for routine servicing, and Boeing handles major maintenance tasks. Boeing also provides technical support for RAAF Globemasters during deployments outside of Australia, and the company is paid in return for achieving contractually mandated aircraft availability targets. Due to the economies of scale arising from a large international maintenance program, the contract with Boeing is considered to be cheaper than attempting to support the aircraft through unique Australian contracts. It is expected that the RAAF's Globemasters will remain in service for 30 years.

Because you can put the engines into reverse thrust while airborne [a definite no-no in most large jets] you know you can just drop out of the sky. The rates of descent and the rates of climb it has are just great.

— Flight Lieutenant Samantha Fairbairn, No. 36 Squadron, on the C-17

The ADF and defence commentators have judged that the Globemaster acquisition has significantly increased the RAAF's airlift capabilities. The aircraft have a maximum range of 10,389 kilometres (6,455 mi) and are capable of operating from short and unsealed airstrips. Each Globemaster can carry up to 77,519 kilograms (170,900 lb) of cargo, and the large size of the aircraft means that it can accommodate outsize items. Maximum loads include 102 passengers, 36 personnel on stretchers, an M1 Abrams tank, three Eurocopter Tiger helicopters or five Bushmaster Protected Mobility Vehicles. These are much larger loads than can be transported by the Air Force's C-130 Hercules transports, and the RAAF website states that each C-17 can carry three times as much cargo as a C-130. Flown with a joystick and fly-by-wire controls, the C-17 is also highly manoeuvrable and responsive considering its size. Ian McPhedran, the defence correspondent for News Corp Australia, judged that the C-17s have "changed the game" for the RAAF by allowing the force to rapidly transport large amounts of cargo into combat zones. According to aviation journalist Nigel Pittaway, the Globemaster's capabilities have made it a highly regarded asset throughout the Australian Defence Organisation.

== Operational service ==
=== Training and combat operations ===
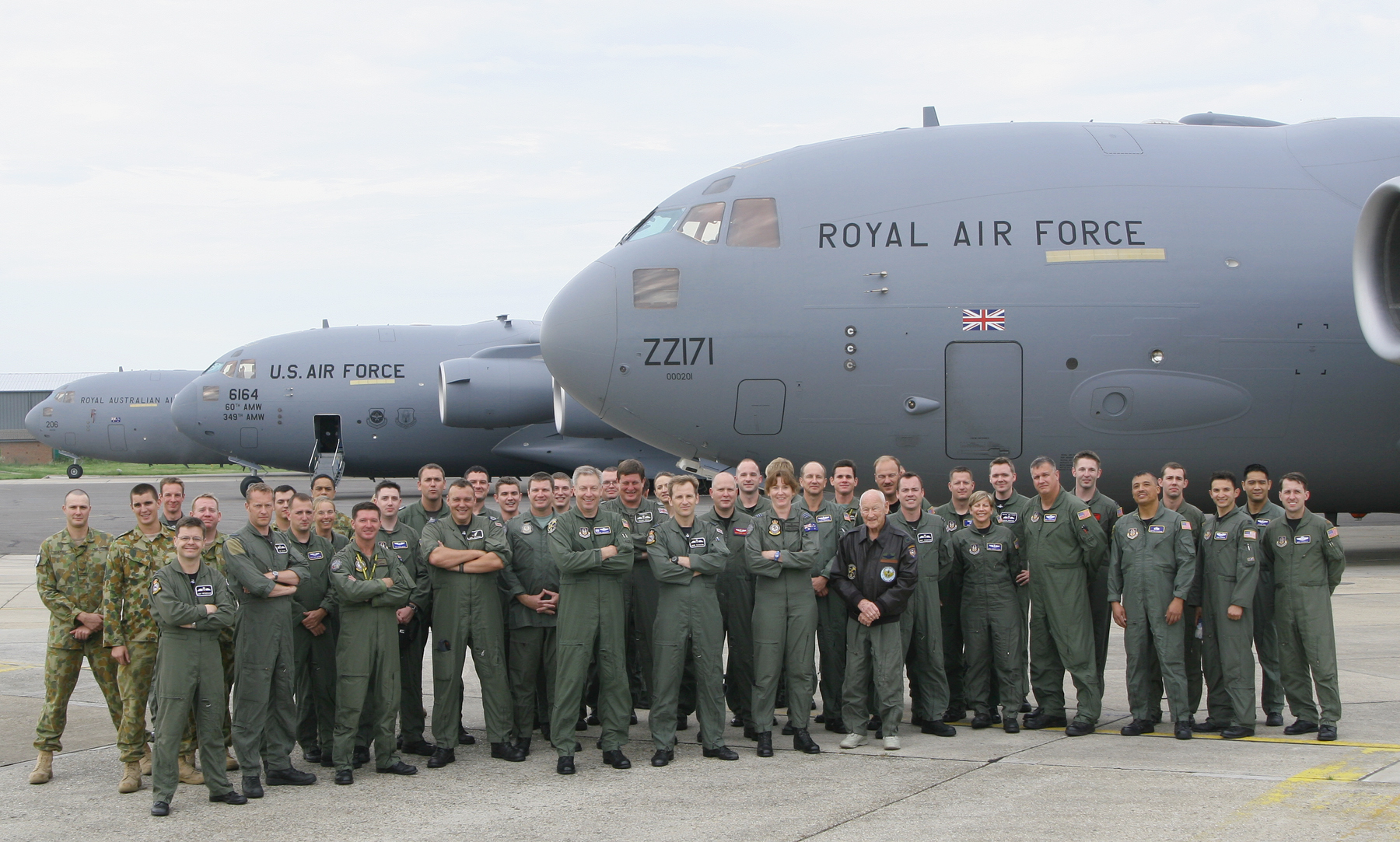
Australian, British and United States C-17 Globemasters and aircrew in Britain during June 2007

Ahead of the delivery of Australia's first C-17s, RAAF personnel received training on the aircraft in the United States. From May 2006 a group of pilots and loadmasters led by Wing Commander Linda Corbould, the commanding officer designate of No. 36 Squadron, undertook conversion training with the USAF's C-17 units at Altus Air Force Base and Charleston Air Force Base. A group of 48 technical personnel also received training at Charleston and McChord Air Force Base from September that year. No. 36 Squadron began a period of intensive training once Corbould delivered A41-206 to Amberley on 7 December 2006, and the unit achieved initial operating capability status in September 2007. Also in 2007, the RAAF's No. 1 Air Operations Support Squadron was expanded by 80 personnel to provide air load teams to support the Globemasters. A project to acquire the equipment needed to allow the RAAF's C-17s to be used in the aeromedical evacuation role and develop associated crew procedures began in late 2007. The first Globemaster aeromedical evacuation sortie was flown on 5 September 2008, the day after the type was certified to operate in this role. On 8 December 2008, Corbould led the RAAF's first all-female aircrew during a training flight over South East Queensland to mark the second anniversary of the entry of the Globemaster into service; the squadron did not have another all-female aircrew until 2020. A team of USAF trainers was posted to Amberley until the RAAF had sufficient C-17 pilots who were qualified to instruct others. The RAAF began training new C-17 pilots in early 2010 after the flight simulator was delivered, and the first Australian-trained pilots graduated in early May that year.

No. 36 Squadron achieved final operating capability status in December 2011. The components for a simulated C-17 cargo compartment were delivered to Amberley in early 2013, and this facility was commissioned in November that year. The simulator is used to train air movements and medical staff as well as to develop and trial new cargo carrying techniques for the C-17s. The first Australian-trained Globemaster loadmasters graduated in mid-2014. The final element of C-17 aircrew training to be routinely conducted in the United States was the course to qualify co-pilots as aircraft captains. This course was relocated to Australia in mid-2017.

The RAAF's Globemasters have supported Australian military deployments worldwide. The Air Mobility Control Centre manages the tasking of the Globemasters, and tries to allocate them to missions for which they are the most cost-effective option. As of September 2008, No. 36 Squadron was conducting fortnightly flights to transport supplies from Australia to bases in the Middle East; at this time the supplies were moved into the combat zones in Iraq and Afghanistan using C-130 transports. Direct C-17 flights into the major Australian base at Tarin Kot in Afghanistan began in July 2009. As No. 36 Squadron's structure does not enable it to permanently station Globemasters in the Middle East, the usual practice has been for one of the types to carry a load of cargo from Australia and then conduct missions in the region for several days before returning to Amberley. In a speech delivered in early 2013, Smith stated that during the previous year the Globemasters had supported operations in the Middle East by flying "60 missions, about 330 hours of flight time, during which the C-17As moved 190 vehicles, 1,800 passengers and over 3,600 tonnes of cargo and conducted 20 aeromedical evacuations". In late 2013 a detachment of two Globemasters, three aircrews and many other personnel from No. 36 Squadron was established at Al Minhad Air Base in the United Arab Emirates. This detachment was the first time that Australian C-17s had been deployed away from Amberley for more than two weeks and was established to transport ADF equipment out of Afghanistan as part of the reduction of the Australian force in the country. Overall, around 100 Globemaster sorties were conducted to fly equipment out of Tarin Kot between November 2012 and the end of 2013. All Australian C-17s that fly into Afghanistan are fitted with a Large Aircraft Infrared Countermeasures system for protection against missiles.

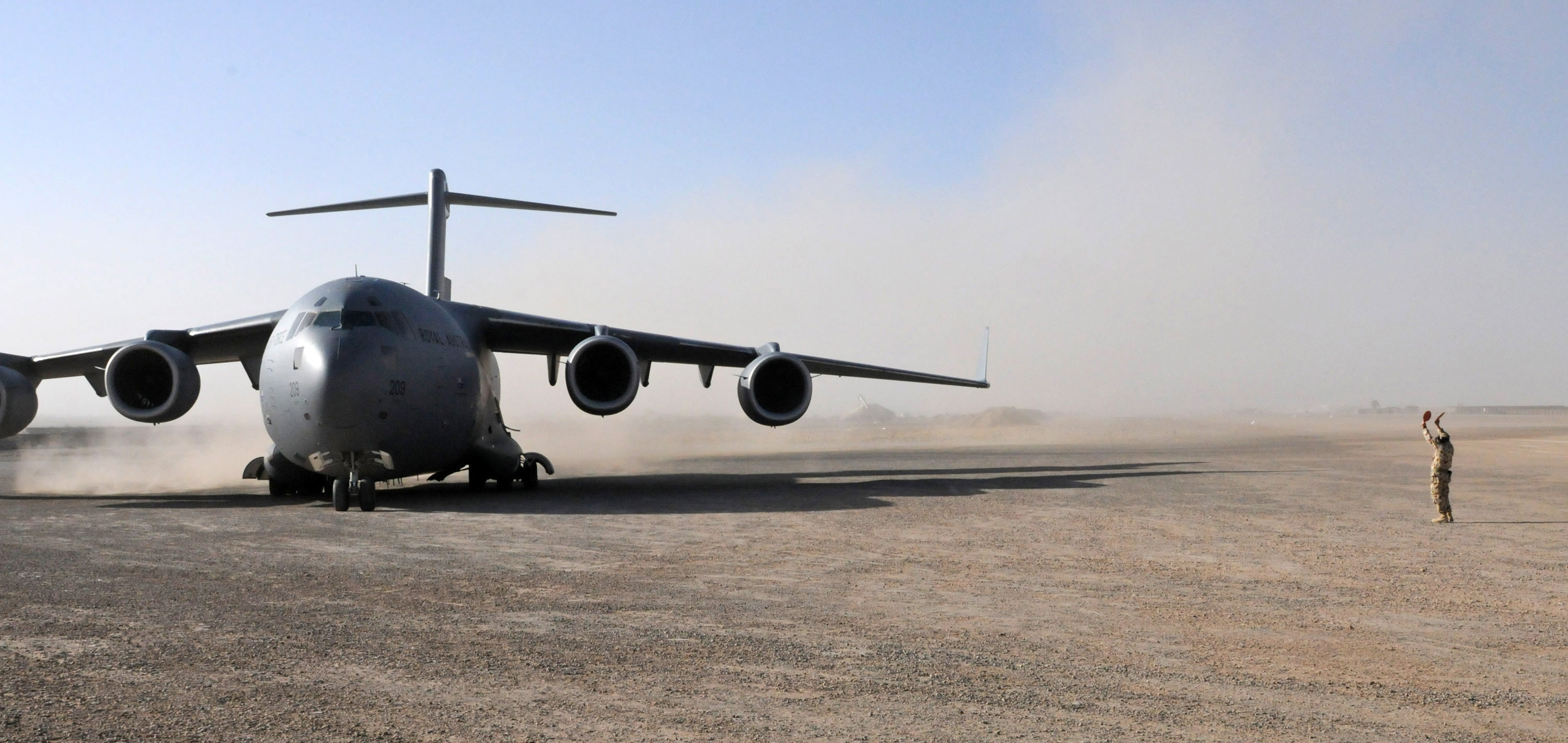
A41-209 in Afghanistan during December 2010

In December 2013 one of the Globemasters which was deployed to the Middle East was, along with a RAAF Hercules, tasked with flying peacekeepers into South Sudan to reinforce the United Nations force there following an outbreak of fighting. This airlift was completed in mid-January, by which time the Australian C-17 had made eight flights into South Sudan from Brindisi in Italy and Djibouti. During September and December 2014, RAAF Globemasters flew five sorties into Iraq to deliver weapons and ammunition destined for Iraqi forces fighting the Islamic State of Iraq and the Levant (ISIL). Following the deployment of Australian fighter aircraft in late 2014 to attack ISIL forces as part of Operation Okra, C-17s also conducted regular flights from Australia to the Middle East carrying munitions and specialised equipment.

Two Australian Globemasters took part in the August 2021 Kabul airlift. These aircraft, operating alongside RAAF Hercules, contributed to the international efforts to transport Afghans out of the city after its capture by the Taliban. In March 2022 RAAF C-17s transported military equipment destined for Ukraine to Rzeszów in Poland in response to the Russian invasion of Ukraine.

C-17s have also supported ADF training. In this role they have moved helicopters and other equipment between Australian bases, and supported training deployments to the United States. In April 2010, members of the Australian Army's No. 176 (Air Dispatch) Squadron became the first paratroopers to jump from a non-American Globemaster; the type was first used to support training by the Army's Parachute Training School in June that year. A C-17 transported an Army M1 Abrams tank for the first time during a training exercise conducted on 11 May 2012. To mark the arrival of the RAAF's final Globemaster, four of the aircraft flew over Brisbane together on 22 November 2012. Each of the C-17s involved in the flight carried a different type of cargo to showcase the type's capabilities; A41-211 was configured for aeromedical evacuation tasks, another C-17 embarked an Abrams tank, one carried two Tiger helicopters and the fourth was loaded with several Bushmasters.

Despite the wide range of tasks which have been assigned to the aircraft, the RAAF is currently not operating its Globemasters in all the roles of which the type is capable. For instance, in February 2013 the Air Force was reported to be investigating using C-17s to drop special forces boats as well as supplies to warships. Trials to develop the capacity to refuel RAAF Globemasters in flight from the force's Airbus KC-30A Multi Role Tanker Transports began in May 2016.

=== Humanitarian tasks ===
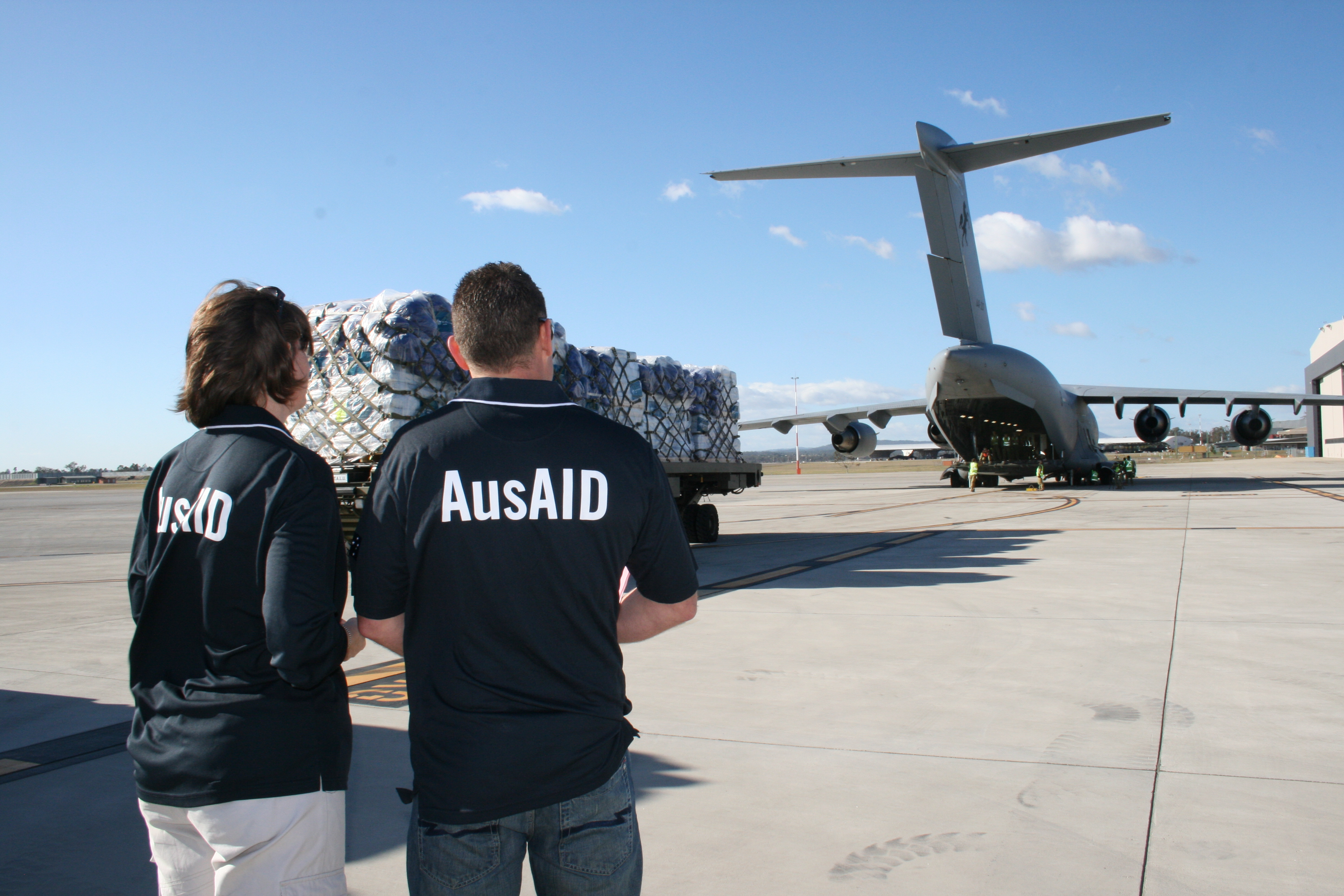
Two AusAID officers watching emergency relief supplies bound for Pakistan being loaded onto a Globemaster in August 2010

In addition to their military tasks, the C-17s have formed part of the Australian Government's response to natural disasters. In November 2007 a C-17 delivered 27 tonnes of supplies to Port Moresby in Papua New Guinea following heavy flooding caused by Cyclone Guba. At the conclusion of the ADF response to this disaster, another C-17 mission was conducted to return Army Sikorsky S-70A-9 Black Hawks to their base at Townsville. During May 2008 a C-17 flew 31 tonnes of emergency equipment from Australia to Yangon in Burma following Cyclone Nargis. Later in the month a RAAF Globemaster transported two Aérospatiale SA 330 Puma helicopters from South Africa to Thailand, from where the helicopters flew into Burma. On 1 October 2009, C-17s transported supplies and ADF evacuation teams from RAAF Base Richmond to Samoa following the earthquake there. Two days later another C-17 sortie delivered medical personnel and other specialists to Padang in Indonesia after the Sumatra earthquakes. In August 2010, two C-17s were dispatched to deliver emergency supplies to Pakistan following widespread flooding there.

No. 36 Squadron was particularly active during 2011. In January that year the squadron had to evacuate two C-17s from Amberley to Richmond when the base was threatened by rising floodwaters during the Queensland floods; of the other two Globemasters, one was in the Middle East and the other was undergoing maintenance and could not be flown. The aircraft stranded at Amberley was moved onto high ground during the crisis at the base and escaped without damage. The two Richmond-based C-17s subsequently flew over 227 tonnes of supplies to flood-affected regions of Queensland. When flooding also took place in Victoria during January, No. 36 Squadron transported 100,000 sandbags to Melbourne and flew Royal Australian Navy personnel and vehicles into the state from HMAS Albatross in New South Wales. No. 36 Squadron returned to Amberley after the flood waters dropped in mid-February. In early February the north Queensland city of Cairns was threatened by Cyclone Yasi, and the RAAF conducted two C-17 sorties and two C-130 sorties to evacuate patients from Cairns Base Hospital on the night of 1/2 February. After the cyclone passed over the Queensland coast, C-17s flew 200 tonnes of groceries into Cairns over a two-day period as part of Operation Yasi Assist. No. 36 Squadron also contributed aircraft to the Australian response to the 2011 Christchurch earthquake in late February, the C-17s flying urban search and rescue teams into the city from the 23rd of the month and evacuating Australian citizens on their return flights.

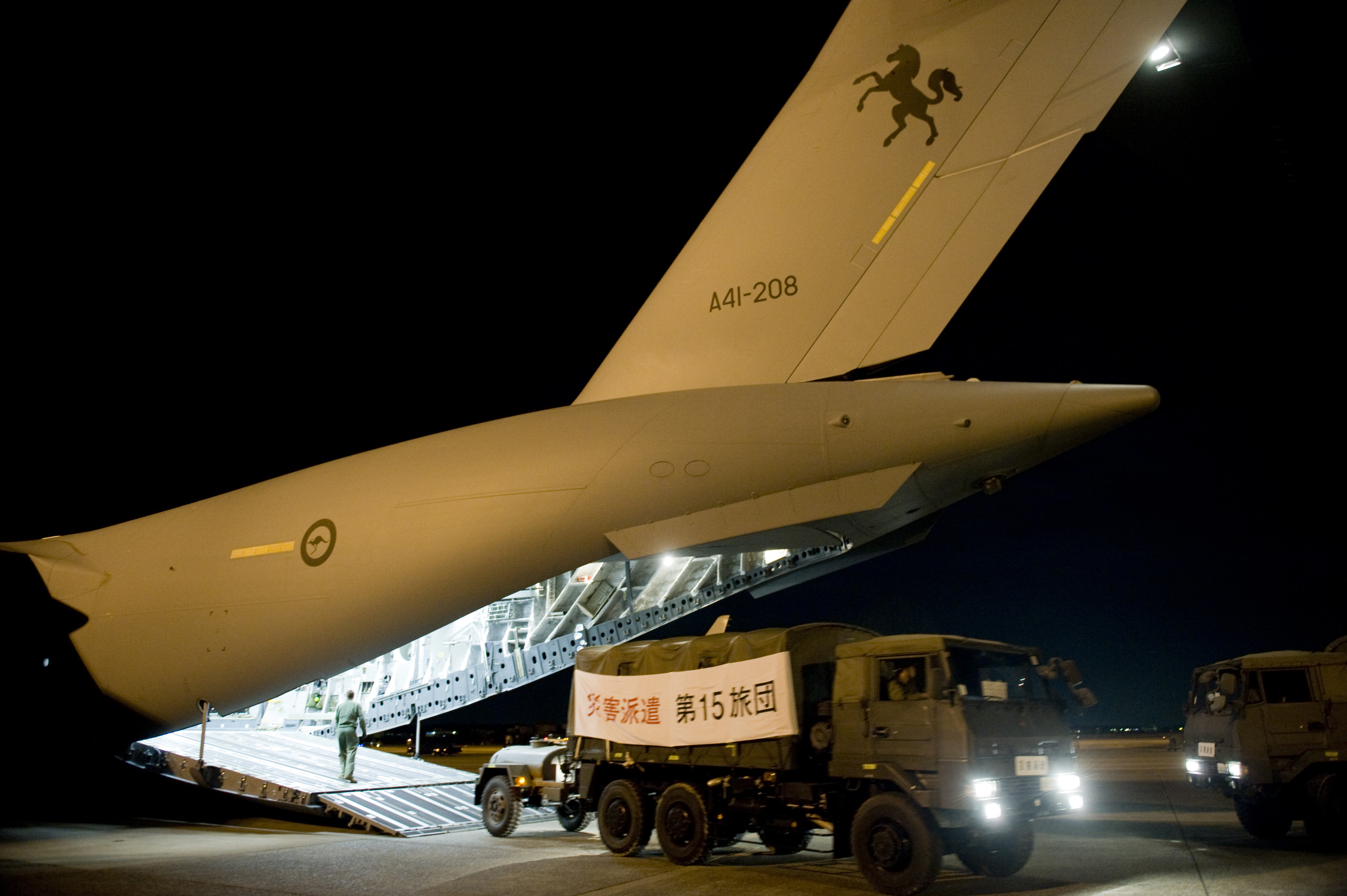
A Japan Ground Self-Defense Force truck driving from A41-208 at Yokota Air Base after being flown from Okinawa

Three Australian C-17s were deployed to Japan as part of Operation Pacific Assist following the 2011 Tōhoku earthquake and tsunami on 11 March. The first aircraft departed Australia two days after the disaster carrying 75 emergency response personnel, most of whom were members of Fire and Rescue NSW. After delivering the personnel to Yokota Air Base, the C-17 remained in Japan to provide additional airlift to the Japan Self-Defense Forces (JSDF). In this role, the C-17 moved elements of the Japanese 15th Brigade from Okinawa to Honshu, and also transported supplies from a JSDF base in Hokkaido. On 21/22 March, two other C-17s (including one temporarily brought back from the Middle East) flew a large water cannon system from RAAF Base Pearce in Western Australia to Yokota; owned by the Bechtel corporation, the water cannon formed part of the efforts to bring the badly damaged Fukushima Daiichi Nuclear Power Plant under control. With the arrival of these aircraft, all three of the available Australian C-17s were in Japan (the fourth was still undergoing maintenance at Amberley). The RAAF maintained a C-17, two flight crews and support personnel in Japan until 25 March. By the end of this deployment the Australian aircraft had conducted 31 sorties and delivered 450 tonnes of cargo. No. 36 Squadron maintained a C-17 in the Middle East over most of this period. Also in March 2011, Smith stated that the Australian Government would probably provide C-17s to transport humanitarian supplies to Libya if the United Nations requested assistance.

The RAAF's C-17s responded to several other natural disasters between late 2011 and 2013. In October 2011 a Globemaster flew a water purification plant to Samoa, from where it was transported by Royal New Zealand Air Force aircraft to Tuvalu. C-17s also transported supplies to Fiji and Samoa in December 2012 following Cyclone Evan. In January 2013 two Globemasters flew power generators and transformers from Amberley to Hobart following the Tasmanian bushfires. Later that month C-17s were used to transport aviation fuel and other supplies into the Queensland town of Bundaberg after it was affected by heavy flooding. In November 2013 a Globemaster flew a civilian medical team and its equipment from Australia to Cebu in the Philippines as part of the relief effort following Typhoon Haiyan; an RAAF C-130 subsequently transported the medical team from Cebu to Tacloban in the disaster zone.

In July 2014, two Globemasters, several aircrews and maintenance personnel were deployed to Eindhoven Air Base in the Netherlands as part of the response to the shooting down of Malaysia Airlines Flight 17 over Ukraine. In conjunction with Royal Netherlands Air Force C-130s, the two aircraft ferried international police officers and their equipment between the Netherlands and Kharkiv in Ukraine. They also flew the bodies of victims of the incident to the Netherlands. A third C-17 flew aircrew and equipment from Australia to the Netherlands. This deployment was completed on 20 August 2014.

The first flight by an RAAF C-17 to Antarctica was conducted in November 2015. The aircraft transported supplies for the Australian Antarctic Division from Hobart to Wilkins Runway, and its crew practised evacuating casualties from Wilkins after the cargo was unloaded. This flight was reported to have been the first time the RAAF had flown missions to the Australian Antarctic Territory since the Antarctic Flight was withdrawn in 1963. Since 2016 Globemasters have made up to six flights to Antarctica each southern summer to support the Australian Antarctic Division. A trial winter airdrop was conducted at Casey Station in June 2016. In September 2017 air-to-air refuelling was used to enable a Globemaster to drop supplies at Davis Station.
