= Linda Corbould =

Royal Australian Air Force officer

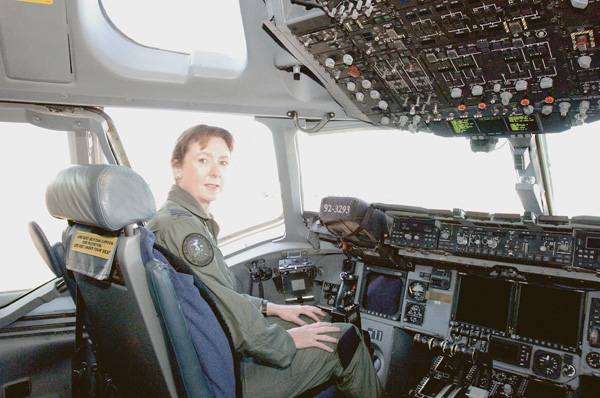
- Wing Commander Linda Corbould training in a USAF Boeing C-17 Globemaster III
- Born: 1962 or 1963 (age 62–63); Tasmania, Australia
- Military career
- Allegiance: Australia
- Branch: Royal Australian Air Force
- Service years: 1981–2011 (Active Service) 2011-Present (Reservist)
- Rank: Wing Commander
- Commands: No. 36 Squadron (2006–08)
- Conflicts: Somalia; East Timor; Iraq War
- Awards: Medal of the Order of Australia

Wing Commander Linda Mary Corbould, OAM (born 1962 or 1963) is an officer of the Royal Australian Air Force (RAAF), who was the first woman to command a RAAF flying squadron. She joined the RAAF in 1981, and became one of its first female pilots in the early 1990s. Corbould flew transport aircraft, including during the Iraq War in 2003, and commanded No. 36 Squadron from 2006 to 2008. She retired from the RAAF's Permanent Force in 2011 and remains an officer in the Air Force Reserve.

== Career ==
Corbould was raised in Tasmania, Australia and joined the RAAF at 18, in 1981. At this time she wanted to become a pilot, but women were barred from this role. In a 2018 interview, Corbould said that the recruitment officers "pretty much laughed at me" when she told them about her ambition. Instead, she served as an air traffic controller until 1990 when pilot training was opened up to women. During this period she took up skydiving, and became a national champion in the sport, representing Australia at the 1985 skydiving world championships, held in Turkey.

After completing flight training, Corbould became the third female member of the RAAF to gain her 'wings' and was subsequently posted to No. 36 Squadron and flew C-130 Hercules transport aircraft. Corbould served as deputy commander of the C-130 Hercules detachment which formed part of the Australian contribution to the 2003 invasion of Iraq and was awarded the Medal of the Order of Australia for planning and commanding a flight into Baghdad on the night of 12/13 April 2003. In October 2003 she met United States President George W. Bush during his visit to Australia. Corbould eventually amassed 15 years of experience as a C-130 pilot. She completed a Diploma of Military Studies at the Australian Command and Staff College during 2005.

In 2006, Wing Commander Corbould oversaw the RAAF's program to accept the C-17 Globemaster III strategic transport aircraft into service. She assumed command of No. 36 Squadron RAAF on 17 November 2006 and delivered the RAAF's first C-17 from the United States to Australia on 4 December 2006. Corbould completed her posting as commander of the squadron on 8 December 2008. On this day she also led the RAAF's first all-female aircrew during a training flight. The next woman to lead a RAAF flying squadron assumed command of No. 33 Squadron in December 2018, and No. 36 Squadron did not have another all-female aircrew until August 2020.

After completing her posting to No. 36 Squadron, Corbould was appointed the Senior Air Force Officer in Tasmania, a position she had requested. She retired from the RAAF's permanent force on 8 May 2011 after completing 30 years of service, and remained an officer in the Air Force Reserve. At this time she had completed more than 4000 flying hours in C-130 Herclues aircraft and 500 flying hours in Globemasters.

In July 2015 Corbould was the keynote speaker at a RAAF Association reunion in Launceston. In November that year she was appointed a member of the Veterans' Review Board, which is an independent statutory authority that assesses decisions made by several Australian Government agencies concerning grants and pensions for ex-service personnel.

Corbould became the Air Force liaison officer for the Australian Air Force Cadets units in Tasmania during 2017. Her duties include arranging opportunities for cadets to have direct exposure to the Australian Defence Force and managing a range of administrative tasks. Corbould remained in this role as of 2026 and intended to retire permanently from the RAAF in 2028.
