= No. 36 Squadron RAAF =

Royal Australian Air Force transport squadron

- No. 36 Squadron's crest
- Active: 1942–current
- Allegiance: Australia
- Branch: Royal Australian Air Force
- Role: Strategic airlift
- Part of: No. 86 Wing (1946–1953, 1955–1964, 1987–current); No. 91 Wing (1953–1955)
- Garrison/HQ: RAAF Base Amberley
- Motto: "Sure"
- Aircraft: Boeing C-17 Globemaster III
- Engagements: World War II: New Guinea campaign; Bougainville campaign; Korean War; Indonesia–Malaysia confrontation Vietnam War; War in Afghanistan; 2003 invasion of Iraq; Military intervention against ISIS
- Battle honours: Malaysia (Confrontation) 1962–1966

Commanders
- Notable commanders: Linda Corbould (2006–2008)

No. 36 Squadron is a Royal Australian Air Force (RAAF) strategic airlift squadron. It operates Boeing C-17 Globemaster III heavy transport aircraft from RAAF Base Amberley, Queensland. The squadron has seen active service flying transport aircraft during World War II, the Korean War, the Indonesia–Malaysia Konfrontasi, the Vietnam War, and the wars in Afghanistan and Iraq. It has also supported Australian humanitarian and peacekeeping operations around the world, including Somalia, Cambodia, East Timor and Indonesia.

The squadron was formed at RAAF Station Laverton, Victoria, in March 1942, and equipped with Douglas DC-2s, among other aircraft. Later in the war it began operating Douglas C-47 Dakotas. From 1946 to 1953 it was controlled by No. 86 (Transport) Wing, which was based in New South Wales at RAAF Station Schofields and, later, RAAF Station Richmond. In 1953 it was re-formed at Iwakuni, Japan, as part of No. 91 (Composite) Wing. It returned to Australia and the aegis of No. 86 Wing in 1955. The squadron began re-equipping with Lockheed C-130 Hercules at Richmond in 1958, becoming the first non-US operator of the type. Over the next half-century it flew two models of Hercules, the C-130A and C-130H. The squadron transferred to Amberley in 2006, when it took delivery of its first Globemaster.

== Role and equipment ==
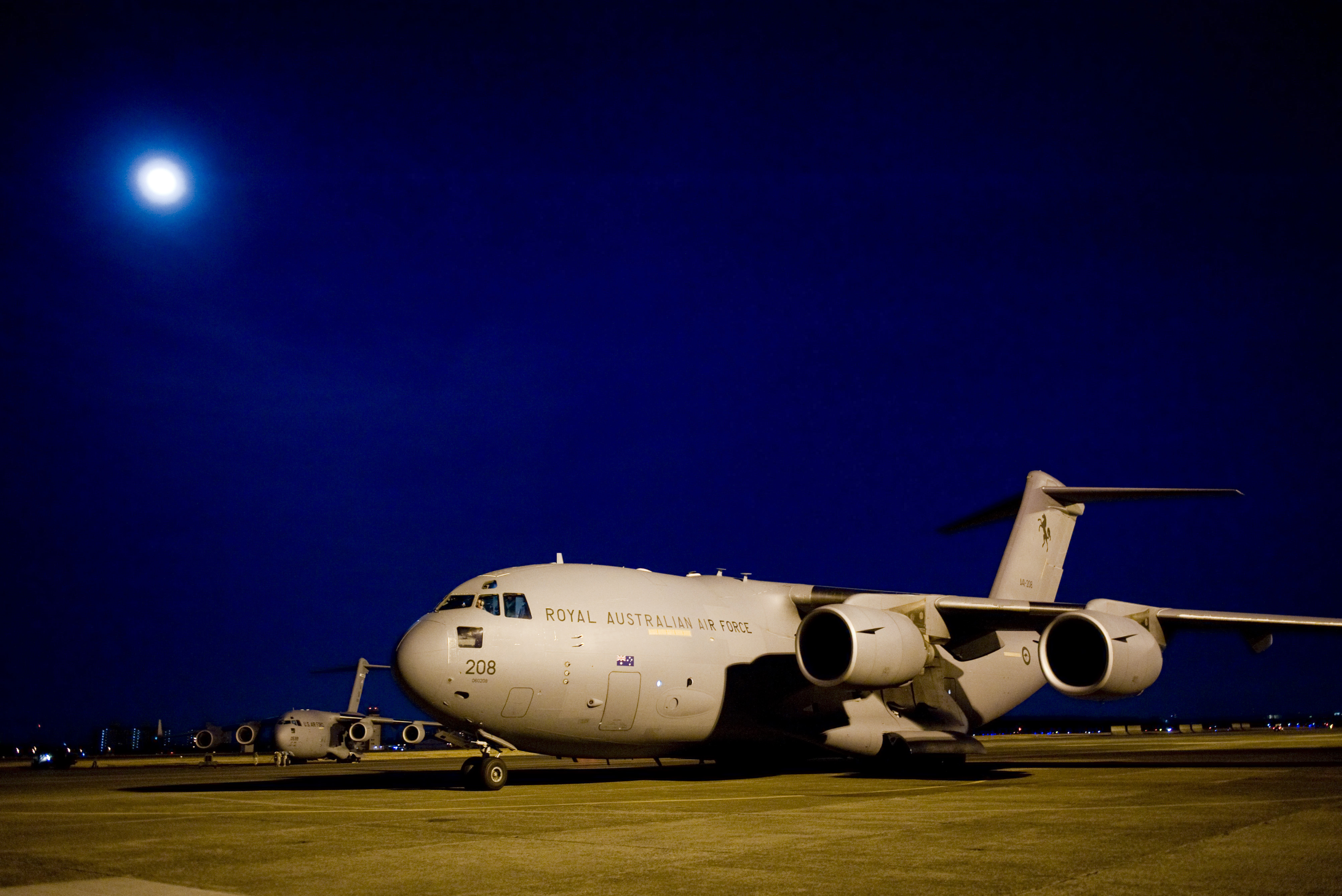
C-17 Globemaster of No. 36 Squadron in Japan for earthquake and tsunami relief, March 2011

No. 36 Squadron is responsible for strategic air transport in Australia and overseas, conducting missions as part of military operations and humanitarian efforts. It is located at RAAF Base Amberley, Queensland, and controlled by No. 86 Wing, which is part of Air Mobility Group. The unit headquarters comprises executive, administrative and operational components. As well as aircrew, the squadron is staffed by maintenance personnel responsible for regular servicing of equipment; they are frequently required to accompany the aircraft on deployments overseas. More complex servicing is conducted by Boeing. No. 36 Squadron's official crest, approved in May 1966, depicts a horse intended to symbolise strength, speed, mobility and dependability. The unit's motto is "Sure".

The squadron operates eight Boeing C-17 Globemaster IIIs, the first of which entered service in December 2006. The eighth and last was delivered in November 2015. The aircraft are generally crewed by two pilots and a loadmaster, the latter being responsible for the loading, carriage and unloading of cargo or passengers. The C-17 can carry 70 tonnes of equipment, and is large enough to accommodate helicopters, tanks and other military vehicles. It can also carry over 130 passengers, and is designed for aerial despatch of paratroops or cargo. The C-17 has a range of some 10,000 km (6,200 miles) and is able to operate from short and unsealed airstrips. Flown with a joystick and fly-by-wire controls, the aircraft is also highly manoeuvrable and responsive considering its size. It can be refuelled in flight by the Airbus KC-30A Multi Role Tanker Transports operated by No. 33 Squadron.

== History ==
=== World War II ===
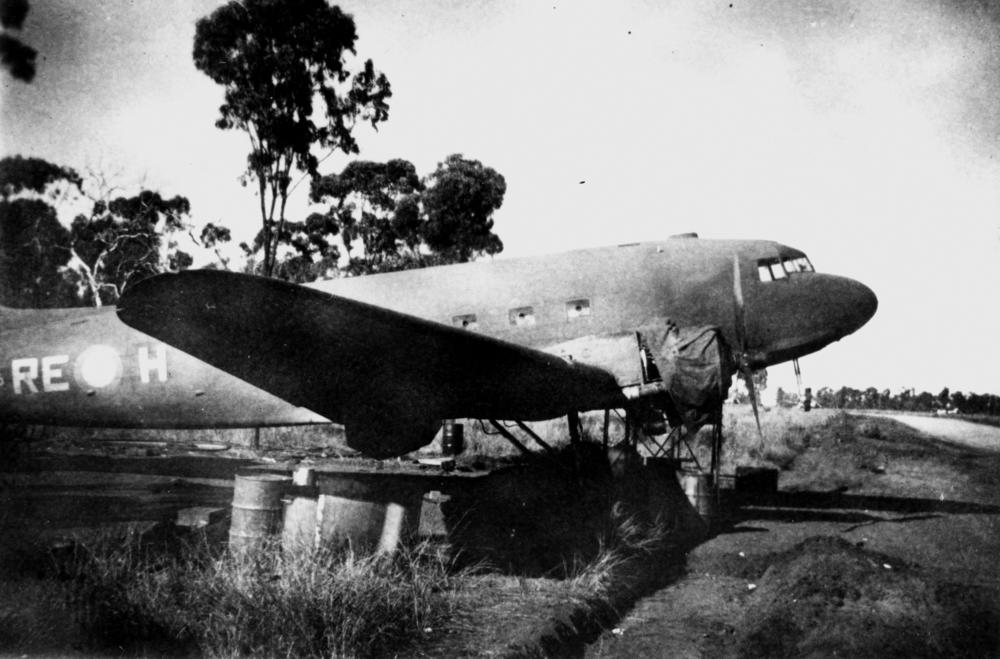
Dakota of No. 36 Squadron at Charters Towers, Queensland, 1943

During February and March 1942, the RAAF formed four transport units: Nos. 33, 34, 35 and 36 Squadrons. No. 36 Squadron was established on 11 March at RAAF Station Laverton, Victoria, under the control of Southern Area Command. Its initial strength was twenty-six personnel and one Douglas DC-2. This was gradually built up to a force of six DC-2s, as well as several de Havilland types including the DH.84 Dragon, DH.86 Express, DH.89 Dragon Rapide, and Tiger Moth. Tasked with transport operations throughout Australia and to Port Moresby, New Guinea, the squadron relocated to Essendon, Victoria, on 17 July. One of the DC-2s crashed at Seven Mile Aerodrome, Port Moresby, on 14 September; all aboard were killed. The squadron was transferred to Townsville, Queensland, on 11 December 1942. During 1943, it maintained detachments at Essendon and in New Guinea, and began re-equipping with twelve Douglas C-47 Dakotas.

On 27 March 1943, a Dakota of No. 36 Squadron crashed on takeoff in pre-dawn fog at RAAF Station Archerfield, killing all twenty-three occupants, twenty of whom were RAAF or Women's Auxiliary Australian Air Force personnel. The squadron relocated to Garbutt on 20 February 1944. During the New Guinea campaign it was responsible for carrying troops and cargo, and undertaking courier runs and supply drops. In 1945, a detachment of No. 36 Squadron Dakotas augmented No. 84 Wing's operations in Bougainville, flying almost 800 sorties between January and June. The squadron lost two Dakotas on supply missions in Aitape during February 1945. In August, it flew paratroopers into Singapore as part of the reoccupation of the city, after which it continued to transport troops and cargo, and repatriate prisoners of war. Following the end of hostilities, in March 1946, a detachment of six Dakotas established a courier service between Morotai and Japan, where Australian units had joined the British Commonwealth Occupation Force.

=== Berlin Airlift and Korean War ===
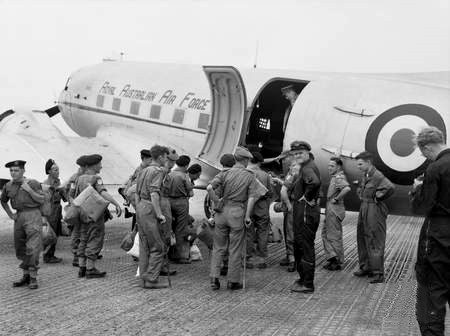
Former prisoners of war board a Dakota of No. 36 Squadron in Seoul, South Korea, August 1953

On 19 August 1946, No. 36 Squadron transferred to RAAF Station Schofields, New South Wales, where it came under the control of No. 86 (Transport) Wing along with Nos. 37 and 38 Squadrons, also operating Dakotas, and No. 486 (Maintenance) Squadron. No. 486 Squadron provided day-to-day servicing for each of the flying squadrons, deeper maintenance being handled by No. 2 Aircraft Depot, based at the nearby RAAF Station Richmond. Courier flights to Japan continued until December 1947, a 21,000 km (13,000-mile) round trip from Schofields. On 25 August 1948, twenty staff from No. 36 Squadron joined five crews from No. 38 Squadron to take part in the Berlin Airlift, a commitment that lasted almost a year. The Australians delivered over 16,000,000 pounds (7,300,000 kg) of supplies, and over 7,000 passengers. In the absence of these crews, Nos. 36 and 38 Squadron operations were amalgamated, flying hours being recorded under the latter's auspices. During June 1949, No. 36 Squadron and the other extant components of No. 86 Wing, Nos. 38 and 486 Squadrons, relocated from Schofields to Richmond.

Nos. 36 and 38 Squadrons began to operate separately again in June 1950, following the return of crews from Berlin and No. 38 Squadron's departure for service in the Malayan Emergency. No. 36 Squadron assumed control of the Governor-General's Flight in October 1950. On 21 November 1952, the squadron was awarded the Duke of Gloucester Cup for its proficiency. The return of No. 38 Squadron from Malaya in December stripped No. 36 Squadron of crews to ensure an even distribution of personnel among the two units. This led to No. 36 Squadron again merging with No. 38 Squadron. The former disbanded at Richmond on 9 March 1953, re-forming the next day from No. 30 Transport Unit at Iwakuni, Japan. Here it was part of No. 91 (Composite) Wing, which controlled the RAAF's units during the Korean War and its immediate aftermath. Its complement included eight Dakotas and one CAC Wirraway. In July and August, the squadron evacuated over 900 Commonwealth prisoners of war. It departed Japan on 13 March 1955, having carried over 42,000 passengers and 6,000,000 pounds (2,700,000 kg) of cargo, and was re-established on 1 May at RAAF Base Canberra, where No. 86 Wing had transferred the previous year.

=== Hercules era ===
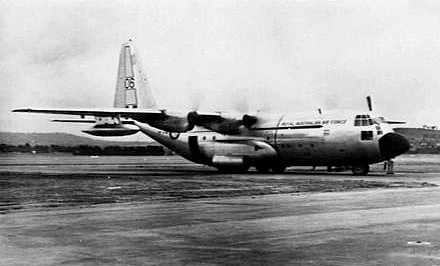
C-130A Hercules of No. 36 Squadron

No. 36 Squadron handed over its six Dakotas to No. 38 Squadron in July 1958, before re-equipping with the Lockheed C-130 Hercules. It returned to Richmond in August, followed by the rest of No. 86 Wing a month later. After conversion training of its personnel in the United States, No. 36 Squadron became the first non-US operator of the Hercules in December 1958, when it began taking delivery of twelve C-130As; deliveries completed in March 1959. The official history of the post-war Air Force described the Hercules as "probably the biggest step-up in aircraft capabilities" the RAAF had ever received, considering it roughly four times as effective as the Dakota, taking into account the improvements in payload, range, and speed. In September 1960, No. 36 Squadron began parachute trials on the Hercules. It made the Hercules' first troop-carrying flights into a combat zone in December 1962, joining a Commonwealth airlift from Singapore to Borneo at the onset of the Konfrontasi between Indonesia and Malaysia; similar missions were undertaken over the next five years. The squadron was again awarded the Gloucester Cup in 1963.

In August 1964, following the disbandment of No. 86 Wing, No. 36 Squadron became an independently operating unit under the command of Headquarters RAAF Base Richmond. No. 486 Squadron was disbanded at the same time, leaving No. 36 Squadron responsible for its own day-to-day maintenance until 1966; No. 486 Squadron was re-formed that year to service both No. 36 Squadron and No. 37 Squadron, the latter having taken delivery of twelve C-130E Hercules. During the Vietnam War, both squadrons undertook long-range transport and medical evacuation flights between Australia and South East Asia, servicing Phan Rang, Vũng Tàu, and Nui Dat. No. 36 Squadron was presented with its standard by Prince Philip, Duke of Edinburgh, on 1 April 1971, in recognition of a quarter-century's service. Eight of its twelve Hercules were involved in relief efforts after Cyclone Tracy struck Darwin, Northern Territory, on Christmas Eve 1974; the aircraft flew over 550 hours, carrying 2,864 passengers and almost 800,000 pounds (360,000 kg) of cargo. After twenty years of service and 147,000 accident-free flying hours, the C-130As were replaced by C-130Hs in 1978.

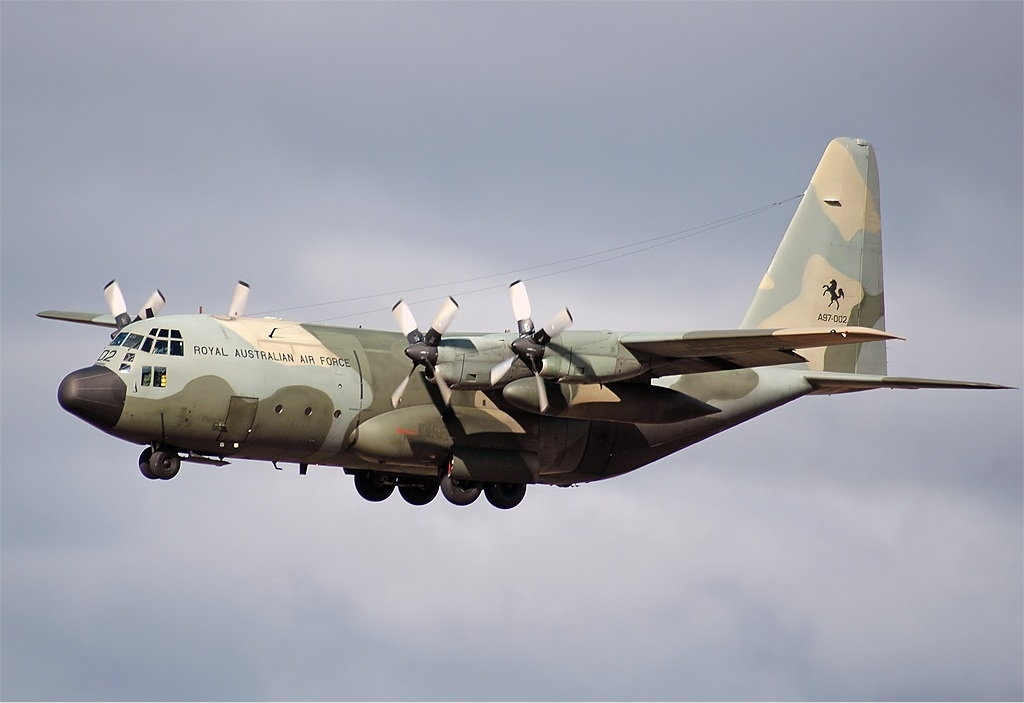
C-130H Hercules in Canberra, August 2004

In November 1978, one of No. 36 Squadron's C-130Hs became the first Australian Hercules to land in Antarctica, at McMurdo Sound. The squadron clocked up 200,000 accident-free flying hours in C-130s during 1984. When No. 86 Wing was re-formed at Richmond on 2 February 1987, under the newly established Air Lift Group (later Air Mobility Group), No. 36 Squadron formed part of its complement. The unit again received the Gloucester Cup in 1989. That year, it provided transport for civilian passengers during the pilots' dispute that curtailed operations by the two domestic airlines; three aircraft and five crews undertook this task, over and above their normal duties. The squadron reached 100,000 accident-free flying hours on the C-130H during 1990. In December 1990 and January 1991, it flew missions to Dubai in support of Australia's naval contribution to the Gulf War, and in 1993 transported Australian troops to Somalia as part of Operation Solace. Four of its C-130Hs were equipped with Electronic Warfare Self Protection packs, including radar and missile warning systems, and countermeasures such as chaff and flares, in 1994. Later in the decade, one of the C-130Hs was fitted with signals intelligence equipment and crewed by RAAF and Defence Signals Directorate personnel.

Six of No. 36 Squadron's Hercules evacuated over 450 civilians from Cambodia following the coup in July 1997. The unit again became responsible for its own routine maintenance in 1998, when No. 486 Squadron was disbanded. A detachment from No. 36 Squadron supported INTERFET operations in East Timor between September 1999 and February 2000. The squadron was assigned four C-130Es previously operated by No. 37 Squadron during the latter's transition to the new C-130J Super Hercules, which commenced in 1999; the E models were retired the following year. No. 36 Squadron was once more awarded the Gloucester Cup in 2001. It took part in relief efforts following the Bali Bombings in October 2002. In February 2003, it deployed a detachment of two Hercules to the Middle East as part of the Australian contribution to the invasion of Iraq. The aircraft arrived on 10 February, and began flying transport sorties less than two weeks later. A No. 36 Squadron Hercules became the first Coalition aircraft to land at Al Asad Airbase, west of Baghdad, after it was secured by Australian special forces personnel. One aircraft was hit by ground fire near Baghdad on 27 June 2004, killing a coalition passenger. The detachment remained in Iraq until September 2004, when it was relieved by two C-130Js from No. 37 Squadron. No. 36 Squadron also participated in Operation Sumatra Assist in the wake of the 2004 Boxing Day tsunami.

=== Globemaster era ===
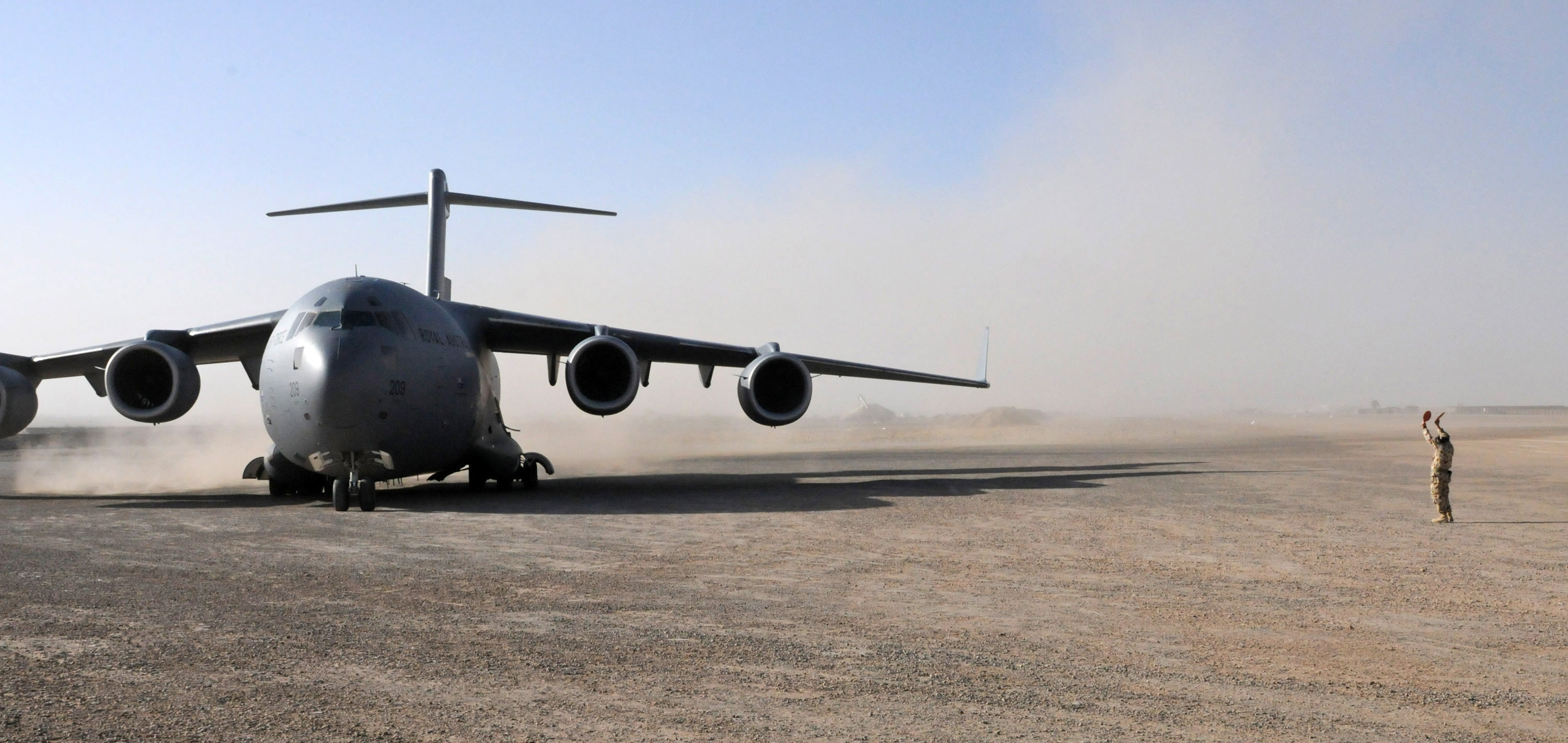
C-17 Globemaster taxiing at Tarin Kowt airfield, Afghanistan, in December 2010

In May 2006, No. 36 Squadron personnel began conversion training in the US in preparation for re-equipping with Boeing C-17 Globemaster III heavy transports. It transferred its C-130Hs to No. 37 Squadron on 17 November 2006, before relocating to Amberley. Also on 17 November, Wing Commander Linda Corbould took command of the unit, becoming the first woman to lead an RAAF flying squadron. Corbould was responsible for delivering the first Globemaster from the United States to Australia on 4 December. No. 36 Squadron achieved initial operating capability with the C-17 on 11 September 2007, following eight months' work-up training. In June 2008, it received the Gloucester Cup as the RAAF's most proficient flying squadron of 2007 "for achieving all training objectives, supporting air lift activities globally and nationally and fulfilling short-notice, high-priority tasks, despite the squadron's expertise being in its infancy". Corbould completed her posting as commanding officer on 8 December 2008, the day the squadron marked the second anniversary of C-17 operations by conducting the RAAF's first flight with an all-female aircrew.

Since re-equipping with the Globemaster, No. 36 Squadron has continued to support Coalition forces in Afghanistan, as well as humanitarian operations worldwide. In 2011, it took part in relief efforts following the floods in Queensland, the Christchurch earthquake, and the Tōhoku earthquake and tsunami in Japan. The Queensland floods necessitated the evacuation of two C-17s to Richmond, when Amberley was threatened by rising waters; of the other two Globemasters, one was in the Middle East and the other was undergoing maintenance at Amberley and could not be flown but was moved onto high ground and escaped damage. The deployment to Japan involved all three of the squadron's available C-17s, the fourth still being serviced at Amberley. On 11 May 2012, a C-17 flew an Australian Army M1 Abrams tank from RAAF Base Darwin to Shoalwater Bay for a training exercise; it was the first time an RAAF Globemaster had airlifted an Abrams, which at 61 tonnes was among the largest single items the 70-tonne-capacity aircraft could carry. In November that year the squadron took delivery of its sixth Globemaster. It was again awarded the Gloucester Cup in March 2013, for its proficiency the previous year.

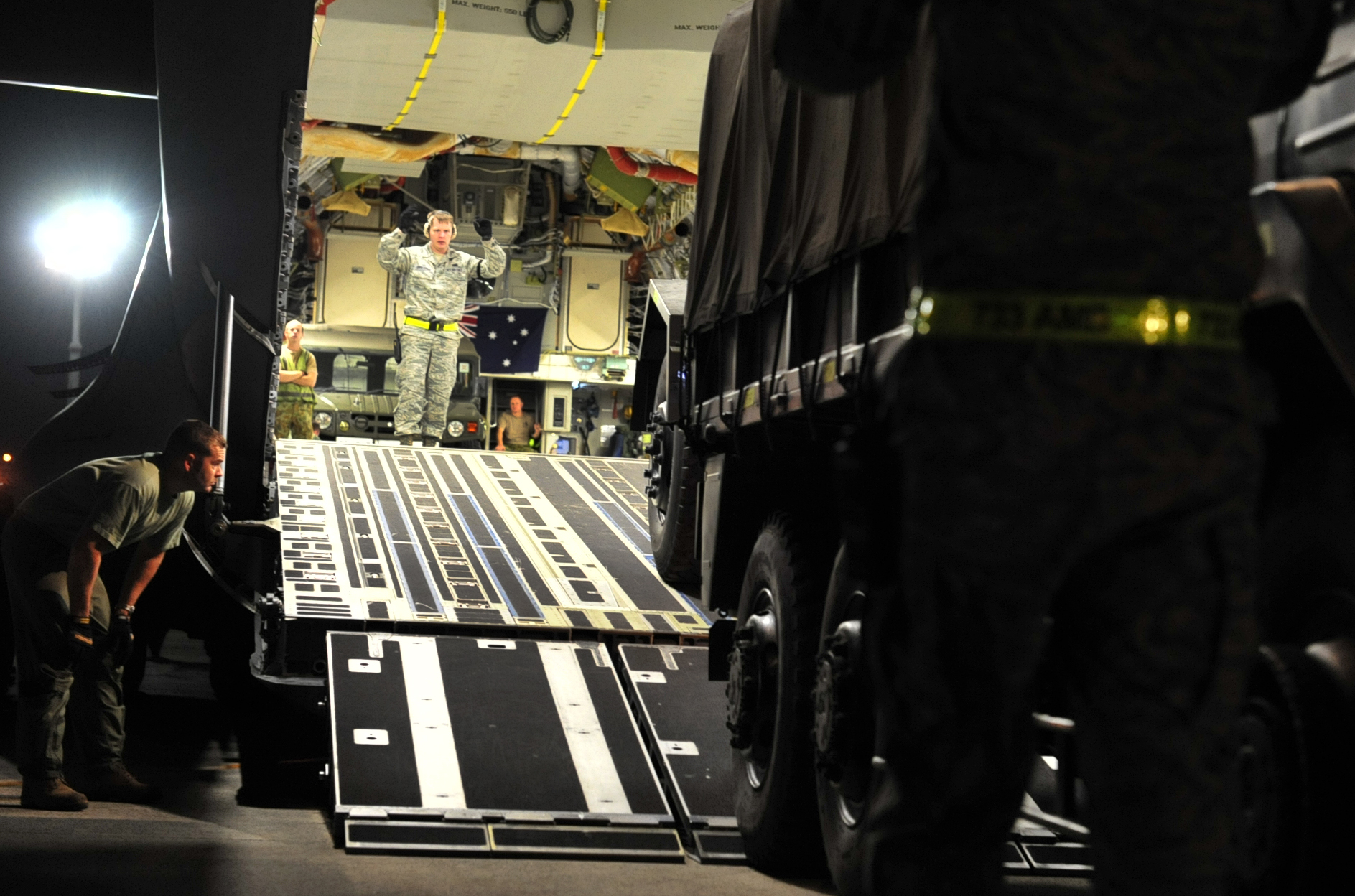
C-17 loading a Japan Ground Self-Defense Force truck as part of the humanitarian response to the 2011 Tōhoku earthquake and tsunami

In September 2014, RAAF C-17s were used to airlift arms and munitions to forces in Kurdish-controlled northern Iraq following an offensive by ISIL militants. On 10 April 2015, Prime Minister Tony Abbott announced the purchase of two more C-17s, which would bring No. 36 Squadron's complement to eight aircraft. Concurrent with delivery of the new C-17s by year's end, No. 36 Squadron's facilities were to be improved, obviating the need for maintenance to take place in No. 33 Squadron hangars. Also on 10 April, the squadron was awarded the Gloucester Cup a record seventh time, and the RAAF's Maintenance Trophy a record fourth time. Later the same month, an Airbus KC-30A Multi Role Tanker Transport of No. 33 Squadron carried out the RAAF's first in-flight refuelling of a No. 36 Squadron Globemaster. The Governor-General, Sir Peter Cosgrove, presented the squadron with a new standard on 19 May; the old standard was laid up in Holy Trinity Chapel at RAAF Williams, Victoria. No. 36 Squadron was awarded the Meritorious Unit Citation in the Queen's Birthday Honours on 13 June 2016 for "sustained outstanding service in warlike operations throughout the Middle East Area of Operations over the period January 2002 to June 2014".

== See also ==
- Lockheed C-130 Hercules in Australian service
- Boeing C-17 Globemaster III in Australian service
