= No. 486 Squadron RAAF =

- No. 486 Squadron's crest
- Active: 1946–64; 1966–98
- Allegiance: Australia
- Branch: Royal Australian Air Force
- Role: Aircraft maintenance
- Part of: No. 86 Wing (1946–64, 1987–98); RAAF Base Richmond (1966–87)
- Garrison/HQ: RAAF Station Schofields (1946–49); RAAF Station Richmond (1949–54); RAAF Base Canberra (1954–58); RAAF Base Richmond (1958–98)
- Motto(s): Strength and Achievement

No. 486 Squadron was a maintenance unit of the Royal Australian Air Force (RAAF). It was formed in August 1946 as part of No. 86 (Transport) Wing, which operated Douglas C-47 Dakotas out of RAAF Station Schofields, New South Wales. The squadron transferred to RAAF Station Richmond in June 1949. It relocated again to RAAF Base Canberra in April 1954, before returning to Richmond in August 1958 to commence maintenance of No. 86 Wing's newly delivered Lockheed C-130 Hercules. The squadron was disbanded between August 1964 and March 1966. In the 1980s and 1990s, it was responsible for servicing the RAAF's Boeing 707 tanker/transports, as well as the Hercules. No. 486 Squadron was again disbanded at Richmond in October 1998, and its functions handed over to No. 86 Wing's Hercules squadrons.

== History ==
No. 486 (Maintenance) Squadron was established at RAAF Station Schofields, New South Wales, on 26 August 1946. Commanded by Wing Commander Alexander Abicair, its allocated strength was 257, including ten officers. The unit was part of No. 86 (Transport) Wing, which also controlled Nos. 36, 37, and 38 Squadrons, flying Douglas C-47 Dakotas, and No. 386 (Base) Squadron. No. 37 Squadron was disbanded in February 1948 and No. 386 Squadron in March 1949. On 22 June 1949, No. 86 Wing, comprising Nos. 36, 38 and 486 Squadrons, relocated to the nearby RAAF Station Richmond. No. 486 Squadron's role included servicing and replacing engines, and fitting long-range fuel tanks and spraying equipment. It occasionally serviced CAC Wirraways in addition to its Dakota maintenance tasks.

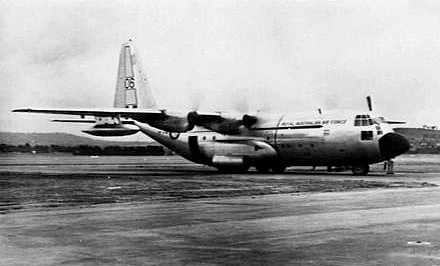
C-130A Hercules at RAAF Base Richmond

On 20 April 1954, No. 86 Wing was transferred to RAAF Base Canberra to help satisfy the Federal government's VIP transport needs. There No. 486 Squadron maintained two Convair Metropolitans, as well as Dakotas. The squadron returned to Richmond on 29 August 1958 in anticipation of the entry into RAAF service of the Lockheed C-130A Hercules. The official history of the post-war Air Force described the Hercules as "probably the biggest step-up in aircraft capabilities" the RAAF had ever received, considering it roughly four times as effective as the Dakota, taking into account the improvements in payload, range, and speed. The Hercules was also the first turboprop aircraft operated by the RAAF. The arrival of the C-130 meant that for a time No. 486 Squadron was maintaining three types of transport aircraft: Hercules, Dakotas and Metropolitans. Heavier maintenance and upgrades to the Hercules were carried out by No. 2 Aircraft Depot, also based at Richmond. The availability of Lockheed spare parts from the US caused problems for No. 486 Squadron early in the C-130A's Australian service, grounding one aircraft for almost a year.

No. 86 Wing was disbanded following the entry into service of the RAAF's first de Havilland Canada DHC-4 Caribou tactical transports in April 1964. Because the Caribous were primarily for support of the Australian Army, an overarching wing headquarters for the Caribous and Hercules was considered inappropriate. On 3 August 1964, No. 486 Squadron was also disbanded and its equipment, staff and records divided between Nos. 36 and 38 Squadrons. No. 37 Squadron was re-established at Richmond in February 1966, flying C-130E Hercules. Consequently, on 28 March, No. 486 Squadron was re-formed under the auspices of RAAF Base Richmond to service both C-130 models. Four technicians from No. 486 Squadron were killed in a car accident near Windsor on 26 June 1968. The unit's maintenance program was reorganised in September 1973. It played a significant role supporting relief efforts in the wake of Cyclone Tracy, which struck Darwin, Northern Territory, on Christmas Day 1974. No. 486 Squadron had thirteen Hercules available by the night of 25 December, and a further six by New Years Day. These nineteen aircraft flew over 1,250 hours, carrying more than 7,000 passengers and over 1,000,000 pounds (450,000 kg) of cargo. The C-130As operated by No. 36 Squadron were replaced by C-130H models in 1978, having clocked up 147,000 accident-free flying hours.

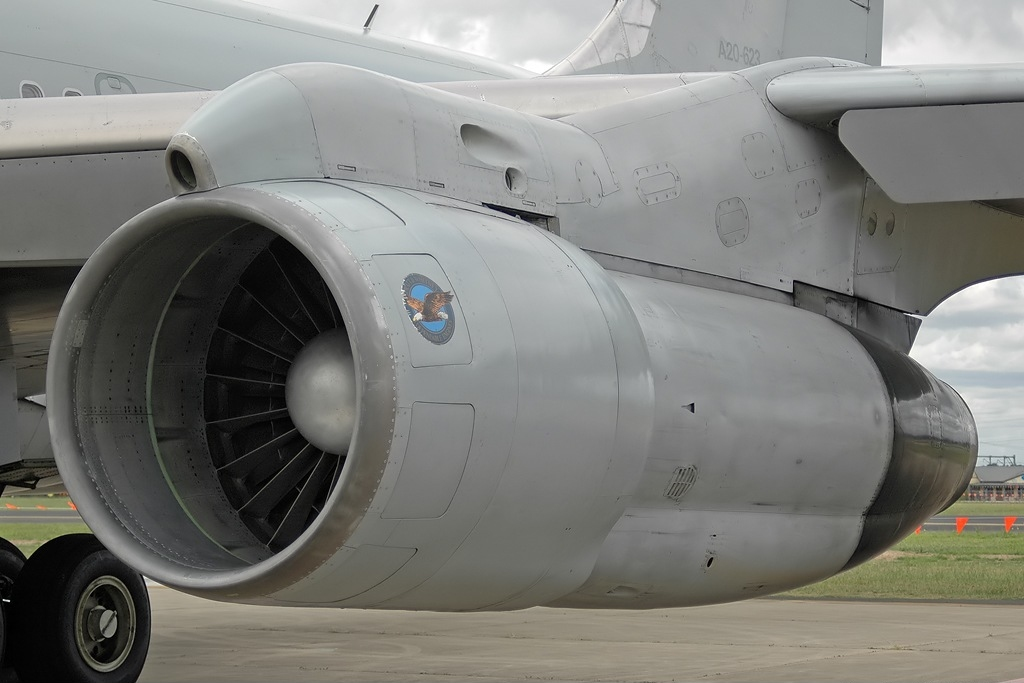
RAAF Boeing 707 jet engine

No. 486 Squadron celebrated its 40th anniversary on 26 August 1986. No. 86 Wing re-formed at Richmond on 2 February 1987, under the newly established Air Lift Group (ALG). As well as No. 486 Squadron, the wing controlled No. 33 Squadron flying Boeing 707 transports, Nos. 36 and 37 Squadrons flying C-130H and C-130E Hercules respectively, and Air Movements Training and Development Unit. No. 486 Squadron was responsible for operational and intermediate-level maintenance of the 707s as well as the Hercules. It also managed flight simulators and all ground-based equipment. The C-130Es operated by No. 37 Squadron achieved 200,000 accident-free flying hours in 1988. Two years later, No. 36 Squadron achieved 100,000 accident-free flying hours on the C-130H. Some C-130 maintenance tasks were outsourced to commercial firms beginning in the late 1980s, and Air New Zealand won a four-year depot maintenance contract in 1990. Following conversion of four of No. 33 Squadron's six aircraft to aerial tankers between 1988 and 1992, No. 486 Squadron took on responsibility for servicing the 707s' refuelling pods.

In 1989, the Australian Government employed the Hercules and Boeing 707s for transport during the pilots' dispute that curtailed operations by the two domestic airlines; the resulting spike in operational hours necessitated No. 486 Squadron sending detachments to several locations throughout the country to cope with increased maintenance demands. In May 1993, squadron personnel accompanied Hercules and 707s transporting Australian troops from Somalia after they had taken part in United Nations humanitarian operations. By the mid-1990s, No. 486 Squadron's strength was over 400 personnel. One of its challenges was the availability of spare parts for the Boeing's ageing Pratt & Whitney JT3D engines. Qantas undertook heavier maintenance of the 707s at its jet base in Mascot. Other depot-level maintenance of No. 86 Wing aircraft was the responsibility of No. 503 Wing, which had been formed from No. 2 Aircraft Depot in July 1992. No. 486 Squadron was disbanded in October 1998, after transferring its functions to Nos. 36 and 37 Squadrons.
