= Australian Aviation =

Australian magazine

- Cover of the August 2007 edition
- Categories: Aviation
- Frequency: Quarterly
- Publisher: Momentum Media
- Founded: 1977
- Country: Australia
- Based in: North Sydney, New South Wales
- Language: English
- Website: australianaviation.com.au
- ISSN: 0813-0876

Australian Aviation is an online and print aviation publication covering the aviation industry.

== History ==
Australian Aviation was founded by in 1977 by Jim Thorn as Australian Aviation & Defence Review. It was founded as an annual, becoming a quarterly publication in 1979, bi-monthly in 1985 and monthly from May 1990. From March 1994 it became all colour.

In April 2005, it was sold to employees Gerard Frawley, Andrew Mclaughlin and Lee Anne Simm.

In 2018, the publication was acquired by Aviator Media. It was subsequently purchased by Momentum Media in 2020.
