= MSA Brolga =

Australian minesweeper

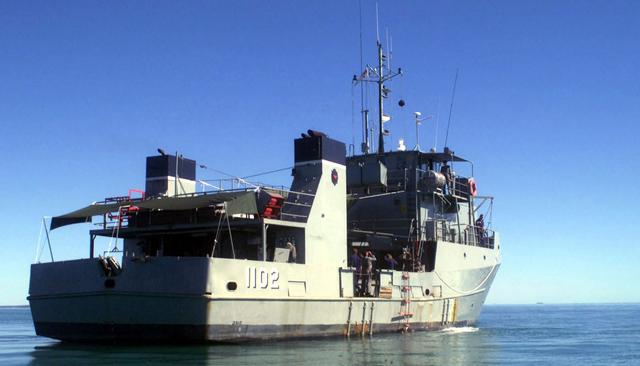
- MSA Brolga in 2001

History
- Builder: Australian Shipbuilding Industries
- Launched: 1975
- Renamed: Lumen (1975–1988); Retriever 1 (2003–present)
- Reclassified: Lighthouse tender (1975–1988); Minesweeper (1988–2003); Recreational vessel, diving and salvage vessel
- Identification: IMO number: 7532662
- Status: Active in private service as of 2008

History

Australia
- Name: Brolga
- Namesake: The brolga
- Acquired: 10 February 1988
- In service: 1988
- Out of service: 2003
- Home port: HMAS Waterhen
- Identification: IMO number: 7532662
- Fate: Sold in 2003

General characteristics
- Displacement: 268 tons full load
- Length: 28.45 m (93 ft 4 in)
- Beam: 8.1 m (26 ft 7 in)
- Draught: 3.5 m (11 ft 6 in)
- Propulsion: 1 Mirrlees Blackstone diesel, 540 hp (400 kW), 1 shaft
- Speed: 10 knots (19 km/h; 12 mph)
- Complement: 8–17 (RAN)
- Sensors & processing systems: I-band navigation radar

MSA (Minesweeper Auxiliary) Brolga (1102) was a minesweeper operated by the Royal Australian Navy (RAN) between 1988 and 2003. Launched in 1975 by Australian Shipbuilding Industries, the ship was designed for the Department of Transport as the lighthouse tender Lumen. Originally operating as a supply vessel for lighthouses around northern Queensland and the Torres Strait, the transition in lighthouse lights from acetylene gas to solar power meant there was less demand for the vessel, and by 1988, the Department of Transport was looking to sell the ship.

Around this time, the RAN was looking to acquire vessels under the Craft of Opportunity Program, to serve as auxiliary minesweepers and technology testbeds.

== Design and construction ==
The ship has a full load displacement of 268 tons, is 28.45 metres (93 ft 4 in) in length, with a beam of 8.1 metres (26 ft 7 in), and a draught of 3.5 metres (11 ft 6 in). Propulsion machinery consists of a single Mirrlees Blackstone diesel, providing 540 horsepower (400 kW) to drive a single controllable-pitch propeller. Maximum speed is 10 knots (19 km/h; 12 mph). Ship sensors were limited to a single I-band navigational radar. Crew complement numbers vary: Jane's Fighting Ships lists 8 crew (including an officer), while the Royal Australian Navy's ship history gives 17.

She was built by Australian Shipbuilding Industries at their facility in Fremantle, Western Australia, and launched in 1975.

== Operational history ==
=== Department of Transport ===
As Lumen, the ship was based out of Newfarm, Queensland, and tasked with supplying lighthouses around northern Queensland and the Torres Strait. As lighthouses became more self-sufficient by converting lights from acetylene gas to solar power, demand for the ship decreased. By 1988, the Department of Transport was offering the ship up for sale or disposal.

=== Royal Australian Navy ===
Around the same time, the RAN was looking for civilian vessels to lease under the Craft of Opportunity Program (COOP). The COOP sought to acquire testbed vessels for minesweeping equipment which could also be used as auxiliary minesweepers to bridge the capability gap between the Ton and Bay classes. The RAN arranged to purchase Lumen from the Department of Transport, with the ship entering naval service as MSA Brolga (taking the name used by a World War I auxiliary minesweeper) on 10 February 1988, in a handover ceremony at HMAS Moreton in Brisbane.

Brolga was assigned to the mine warfare base at HMAS Waterhen. In minesweeping configuration, Brolga could be fitted with a Klein Type 590 towed sidescan sonar array, a Mini-Dyad magnetic influence sweep array, an AMASS influence sweep array, and mechanical minesweeping gear. The ship was not armed while in naval service.

During 1989, Brolga was used for testing of the Defence Science and Technology Organisation magnetic influence minesweep. In 1991, she sailed from Jervis Bay to Bass Strait to provide sonar and navigation support to clearance diving teams involved in the search and recovery of a RAAF Boeing 707 that crashed during a training exercise.

Brolga was briefly deployed to Bougainville from 3 August to 13 September 1999, in support of the Peace Monitoring Group (PMG) deployed following the end of the Bougainville Civil War in 1998. A second and longer deployment with the PMG commenced in September 2000. Although the ship remained on station for seven months, returning to Sydney on 13 March 2001, personnel were rotated to and from the ship frequently. Activities during the PMG deployments included the transportation of patrol groups and monitoring teams around Bougainville and the surrounding islands, along with peacekeeping patrols and community engagements.

In 2001, Bronga participated in the Australia-United States combined operations exercise Operation Tandem Thrust.

After the Huon-class minehunters finished entering service in 2002, Brolga was no longer required by the RAN and was marked for disposal. The ship was sold into private hands at auction in late 2003, with a sale price of A$255,000.

=== Civilian ===
Following the sale, Brolga was relocated to Fremantle in February 2004. At the time of the sale, the new owner stated the intention of using her as a mothership for a fishing fleet.

Later converted to a diving and salvage platform, the renamed Retriever 1 was suspected to be linked to the disappearance of conman Peter Foster in January 2007. She was detained and searched multiple times by Vanuatuan police, and three of the ship's eight crew were arrested on immigration and firearms charges. Three crew members were charged with harbouring Foster, but they denied the charges. However, according to Andrew Kelman, head of Transnational Crimes Unit for Vanuatu, Peter Foster had claimed he had been on the boat and had tried to make a deal with Kelman implicating the crew.
