= Brolga (ship) =

Two ships of the Royal Australian Navy have been named Brolga, after the brolga.

- ST Brolga, a fishing vessel acquired as an auxiliary minesweeper in 1917 and returned to owners in 1918
- MSA Brolga (1102), a lighthouse tender acquired as an auxiliary minesweeper in 1992 and sold in 2003
