= Bay class =

Bay class can refer to any of the following classes of ships:

- Bay-class frigate, serving the Royal Navy from 1943 until the 1960s, the Finnish Navy until 1973 and the Portuguese Navy during the late 1960s
- Bay-class tugboat, serving the United States Coast Guard from 1979 to the present
- Bay-class landing ship, serving the Royal Navy as part of the Royal Fleet Auxiliary from 2006 to the present, and the Royal Australian Navy from 2011 to present
- Bay-class minehunter, serving the Royal Australian Navy from 1991 until 2001
- Bay-class minesweeper, serving the Royal Canadian Navy and Canadian Forces from the 1950s to the 1990s, and also serving in the French and Turkish navies
- Bay-class patrol boat, serving the Australian Customs Service from 1999 to the present
- Bay-class landing ship, serving the Royal Fleet Auxiliary and the Royal Australian Navy from 2006 to present
