= MSA Gunundaal =

Australian Navy auxiliary minesweeper

History

Australia
- Name: Flamingo Bay
- Fate: Sold to Royal Australian Navy in 1989

History

Australia
- Name: MSA Gunundaal
- Acquired: 11 May 1992
- Out of service: 1992
- Home port: HMAS Waterhen

General characteristics
- Length: 27.5 m (90 ft)

MSA Gunundaal was an auxiliary minesweeper operated by the Royal Australian Navy (RAN). Flamingo Bay was operated commercially as a fishing boat until she was acquired under the RAN's Craft of Opportunity Program for use as an auxiliary. Gunundaal was found to be unseaworthy in December 1992 and stricken.
