= Shoalwater =

Shoalwater may refer to:

- Shoalwater, Western Australia, a suburb of Perth in Western Australia
- Shoalwater Bay, a large bay on the central coast of Queensland, Australia, in use since 1966 as a military training area
- Shoalwater Bay, the original name given by settlers to Willapa Bay in Washington, United States of America
- Shoalwater Bay Tribe, a Native American tribe in western Washington state
- HMAS Shoalwater (M 81), a minehunter operated by the Royal Australian Navy from 1987 to 2001
- Shoalwater (sidewheeler 1852), a steamboat that operated the upper Willamette River
