= Bandicoot-class minesweeper =

Australian naval vessel

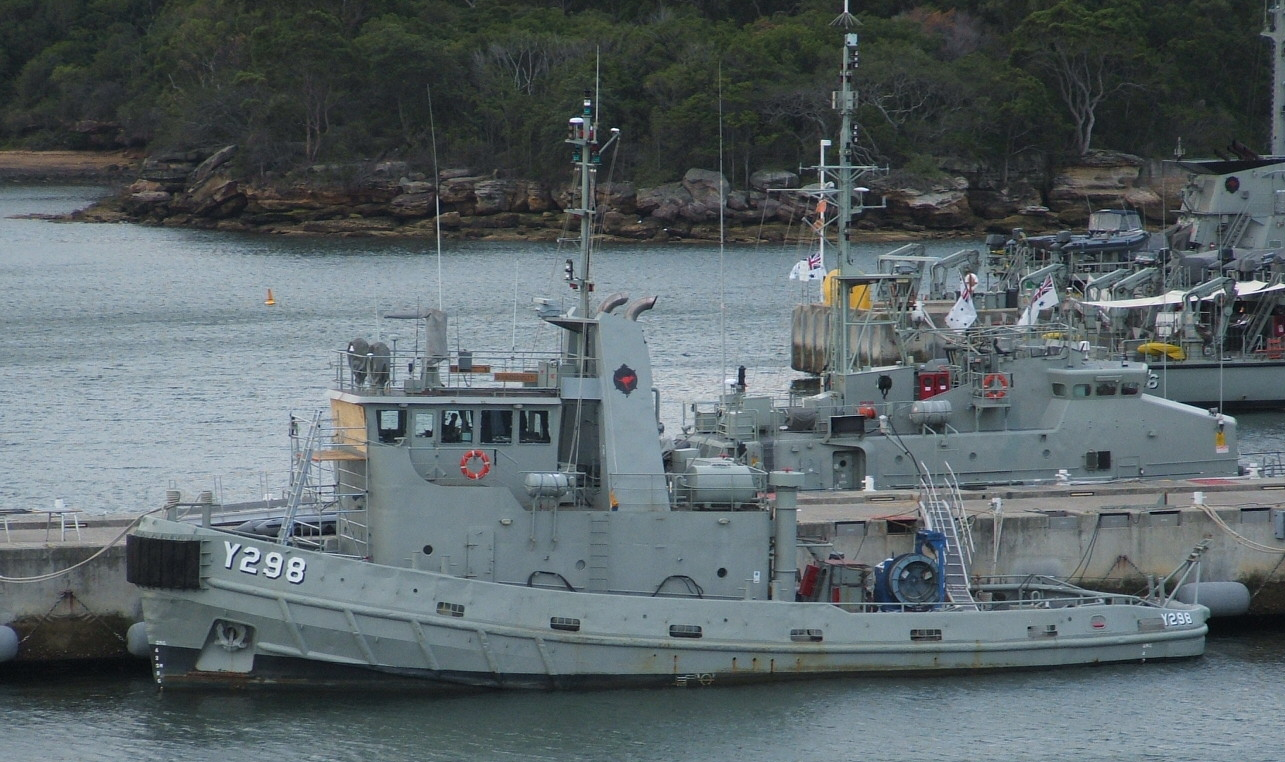
- MSA Bandicoot at HMAS Waterhen in 2007

Class overview
- Builders: Mipe Shipbuilding
- Operators: Royal Australian Navy
- Built: 1982
- In service: 1991-2014
- Laid up: 2

General characteristics
- Type: Minesweeper Auxiliary / Tugboat
- Displacement: 412 tonnes
- Length: 29.6 metres (97 ft)
- Beam: 8.5 metres (28 ft)
- Draught: 3.4 metres (11 ft)
- Propulsion: 2 x Stork Werkspoor diesel engines, 2 shafts
- Speed: 11 knots (20 km/h; 13 mph)
- Range: 6,300 nautical miles (11,700 km; 7,200 mi) at 10 knots (19 km/h; 12 mph)
- Complement: 10-12
- Time to activate: 30 days to reactivation, 42 days to deployment
- Sensors & processing systems: Radar: Furuno 7040D I-band navigational radar; Sonar: Klein Type 590 sidescan sonar array (as required)

The Bandicoot class was a ship class of two minesweeper tugboats operated by the Royal Australian Navy (RAN). MSA Bandicoot (Y 298) and MSA Wallaroo (Y 299) were built in 1982 for Maritime (PTE) Ltd. as the tugboats Grenville VII and Grenville V. In 1990, the RAN purchased the vessels for conversion into auxiliary minesweepers under the Craft of Opportunity Program (COOP). The vessels could be equipped with a sidescan sonar and various towed minesweeping arrays, and also functioned as berthing tugs. Both vessels were placed in reserve in 2010, but were deployed on several occasions since to provide berthing support to nuclear-powered warships. They were removed from naval service in 2014.

== Design and construction ==
Bandicoot and Wallaroo were built by Mipe Shipbuilding for Singaporean company Maritime (PTE) Ltd. as the tugboats Grenville VII and Grenville V, and entered service in 1982. The two tugboats were purchased by the RAN for the Craft of Opportunity Program (COOP) on 3 and 8 August 1990, and were delivered on 11 August 1990. The tugboats underwent conversion to serve as auxiliary minesweepers, with modifications completed by mid-1991.

Each vessel displaced 412 tonnes at full load, was 29.6 metres (97 ft) in length, had a beam of 8.5 metres (28 ft), and a draught of 3.4 metres (11 ft). Propulsion machinery consisted of two Stork Werkspoor diesel engines, each connected to a propeller shaft. Maximum speed was 11 knots (20 km/h; 13 mph), and range was 6,300 nautical miles (11,700 km; 7,200 mi) at 10 knots (19 km/h; 12 mph). They were equipped with a Furuno 7040D I-band navigational radar. The ships initially had a towing capacity rated at a bollard pull of 30 tons, but this was removed during the COOP conversion. Ten to twelve personnel were required to operate each ship.

== Role and operational history ==
Bandicoot and Wallaroo were primarily operated as a supplementary minesweeping force. In this role, they were equipped with a Klein Type 590 sidescan sonar array, along with a Mini-Dyad magnetic influence sweep array, an AMASS influence sweep array, or mechanical minesweeping gear. The vessels were also used as berthing tugs, primarily for foreign warships.

From 1999 to 2001, Bandicoot and Wallaroo were involved in Operation Bel Isi, the Australian commitment to the Bougainville Peace Monitoring Group.

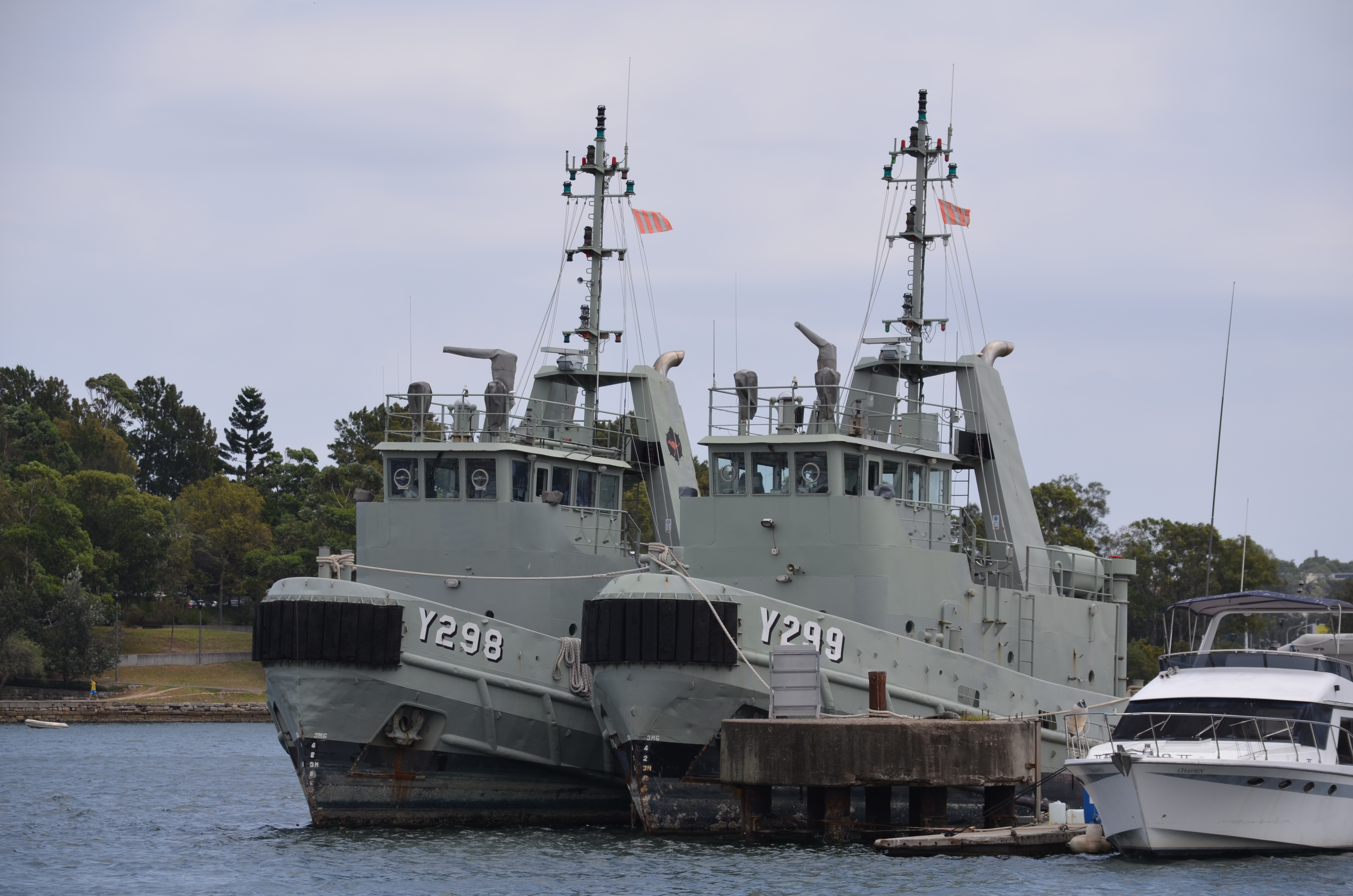
Bandicoot (left) and Wallaroo berthed in Blackwattle Bay, New South Wales in 2014

In 2008, it was predicted that both ships would leave service in 2012. On 1 October 2010, both vessels were placed in reserve, able to be reactivated in 30 days and able to deploy in 42. Although no longer used for minesweeping operations, the tugboats were deployed on several occasions to provide berthing support for visiting nuclear-powered warships. By December 2012, their projected end-of-service date had been pushed back to early 2013. The 2015-2016 edition of Jane's Fighting Ships lists the two vessels as having been deleted sometime in 2014.
