= Koraaga =

Two ships have been named Koraaga.

- ST Koraaga (1914), a fishing vessel acquired by the News South Wales government in 1915, used as a minesweeper from 1917 to 1918, sold into proviate ownership in 1923, and shipwrecked in 1931.
- MSA Koraaga, a fishing vessel acquired by the Royal Australian Navy as an auxiliary minesweeper in 1989 and sold off in 2000.
