= Bermagui =

Bermagui may refer to:

- Bermagui, New South Wales
- Bermagui River
- HMAS Bermagui, a commissioned auxiliary minesweeper operated by the Royal Australian Navy during World War II
- MSA Bermagui, a non-commissioned auxiliary minesweeper operated by the Royal Australian Navy during the 1990s
