= No. 33 Squadron RAAF =

Royal Australian Air Force tanker/transport squadron

- No. 33 Squadron's crest
- Active: 1942–1946; 1983–current
- Allegiance: Australia
- Branch: Royal Australian Air Force
- Role: Air-to-air refuelling Strategic transport VIP transport
- Part of: No. 86 Wing
- Garrison/HQ: RAAF Base Amberley
- Motto: "Enduring"
- Aircraft: Airbus KC-30
- Engagements: World War II: New Guinea campaign; Operation Solace; Operation Southern Watch; War in Afghanistan; War against the Islamic State

No. 33 Squadron is a Royal Australian Air Force (RAAF) strategic transport and air-to-air refuelling squadron. It operates Airbus KC-30A Multi Role Tanker Transports from RAAF Base Amberley, Queensland. The squadron was formed in February 1942 for service during World War II, operating Short Empire flying boats and a variety of smaller aircraft. By 1944 it had completely re-equipped with Douglas C-47 Dakota transports, which it flew in New Guinea prior to disbanding in May 1946.

The unit was re-established in February 1981 as a flight, equipped with two Boeing 707s for VIP and other long-range transport duties out of RAAF Base Richmond, New South Wales. No. 33 Flight was re-formed as a full squadron in July 1983. By 1988 it was operating six 707s, four of which were subsequently converted for aerial refuelling. The 707s saw active service during operations in Namibia, Somalia, the Persian Gulf, and Afghanistan. One of the transport jets was lost in a crash in October 1991. No. 33 Squadron relocated to Amberley and was temporarily without aircraft following the retirement of the 707s in June 2008. It began re-equipping with KC-30s in June 2011, and achieved initial operating capability with the type in February 2013. One of its aircraft was deployed to the Middle East in September 2014 as part of Operation Okra, Australia's contribution to the war against the Islamic State. The squadron maintained a KC-30 on Okra for the next six years, completing 1,440 air-to-air refuelling missions.

== Role and equipment ==
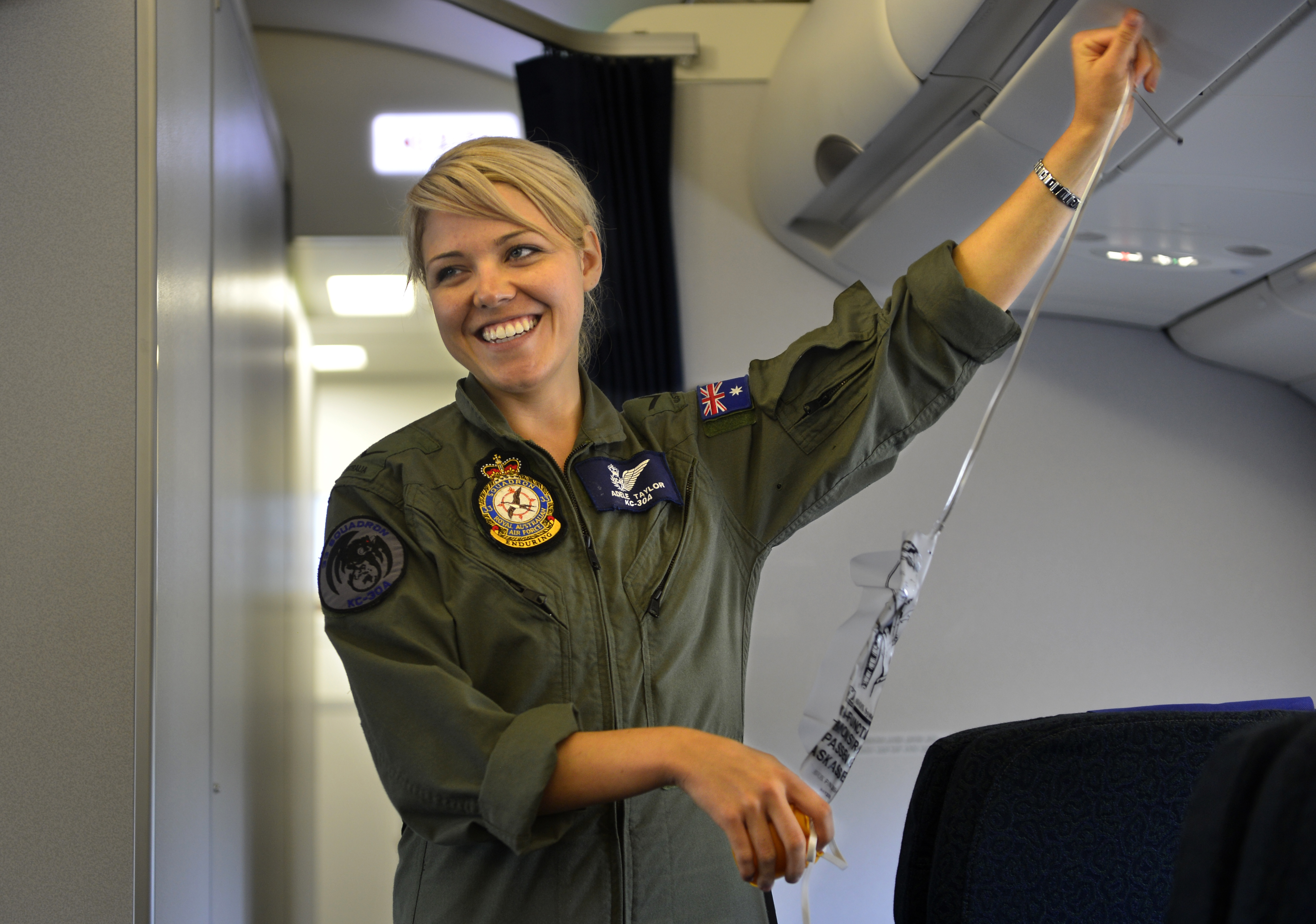
Crew member giving a safety brief aboard a No. 33 Squadron Airbus KC-30, February 2013

No. 33 Squadron is responsible for aerial refuelling and long-range transport. It is located at RAAF Base Amberley, Queensland, and controlled by No. 86 Wing, which is part of Air Mobility Group. The unit headquarters comprises executive, administrative and operational components. As well as aircrew, the squadron is staffed by maintenance personnel responsible for regular aircraft service. Heavier maintenance is conducted by Northrop Grumman Integrated Defence Services (formerly Qantas Defence Services). No. 33 Squadron's motto is "Enduring".

The squadron operates seven Airbus KC-30A Multi Role Tanker Transports, the first of which entered service in June 2011. The aircraft are crewed by pilots, refuelling operators, mission coordinators, and flight attendants. Air-to-air refuelling is considered a force multiplier, permitting the RAAF to increase the range and loiter time of its aircraft. The ability to refuel in flight also enables aircraft to take off with more ordnance than they might otherwise.

The KC-30 can carry over 110 tonnes of fuel. Its dual delivery systems—probe-and-drogue in the wings and boom under the tail—are designed to refuel the RAAF's Lockheed Martin F-35A Lightning II and Boeing F/A-18 Super Hornet multi-role fighters, Boeing EA-18G Growler electronic attack aircraft, Boeing E-7 Wedgetail early warning aircraft, Boeing C-17 Globemaster III heavy airlifters, Boeing P-8A Poseidon maritime patrol aircraft, or other KC-30s. In its transport configuration, the KC-30 can carry 270 passengers or 34 tonnes of cargo. As well as its aircraft, No. 33 Squadron operates a KC-30 simulator at Amberley.

== History ==
=== World War II ===
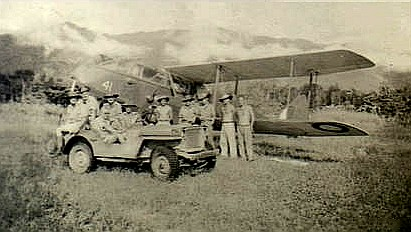
No. 33 Squadron de Havilland Dragon at Kokoda, New Guinea, in February 1943

During February and March 1942, the RAAF formed four transport units: Nos. 33, 34, 35 and 36 Squadrons. No. 33 Squadron was established on 16 February at Townsville, Queensland, under the control of North-Eastern Area Command. It was equipped with four Short Empire flying boats—originally of Qantas—that were transferred from No. 11 Squadron, along with several smaller types including de Havilland Dragons and Tiger Moths, Avro Ansons, and Vultee Vigilants. The squadron suffered its first loss on 27 February, when one of the Empires crashed on landing at Townsville; the six crew members were killed. A second Empire was destroyed at its mooring during a Japanese air attack on Broome, Western Australia, on 3 March; another Empire was impressed from Qantas to replace the lost aircraft. Two months later the commanding officer, Squadron Leader Charles Gurney, was killed while co-piloting a USAAF Martin B-26 Marauder that crashed after attacking Rabaul. One of No. 33 Squadron's tasks was search-and-rescue; on 8 August 1942 it lost another Empire that sank in heavy seas off the coast of New Guinea during an attempt to rescue survivors of a torpedoed ship.

No. 33 Squadron transferred to Port Moresby in January 1943, providing air transport to Australian forces involved in the New Guinea campaign. Transport needs were so desperate in New Guinea that even the Tiger Moths were employed, delivering a total of 77 kilograms (170 lb) per trip. In September–October 1943, the squadron began taking delivery of fifteen Douglas C-47 Dakotas to replace its assortment of aircraft. By the time it transferred to Milne Bay on 1 January 1944, it was operating Dakotas exclusively, and continued to do so for the rest of the war. The squadron relocated to Lae on 15 January 1945. Following the end of hostilities in August 1945, it was tasked with repatriating service personnel and former prisoners of war. No. 33 Squadron returned to Townsville on 11 March 1946, and was disbanded there on 13 May.

=== Post-war re-establishment ===
In 1978, the Australian government decided to purchase two passenger jets for strategic transport, primarily to mitigate what it saw as the risk of terrorist attack inherent in carrying VIPs on commercial flights. Its attempts to procure one Boeing 727 each from domestic carriers Ansett and TAA were unsuccessful but, in December, Qantas agreed to sell the government two Boeing 707s for $14.5 million. Purchasing big jets for VIPs was controversial, but the 707s were also intended for general long-range transport, being capable of carrying cargo or up to 160 passengers. The first was transferred to the RAAF in March 1979, and its inaugural Air Force flight took place on 22 April. Located at RAAF Base Richmond, New South Wales, the 707s were initially operated by No. 37 Squadron. They were formed into No. 33 Flight under the command of Wing Commander J.D. Grierson on 2 February 1981. The flight's first mission took place the same day, when it ferried RAAF members and their families to RAAF Base Butterworth, Malaysia, a task that had previously necessitated a Qantas charter.

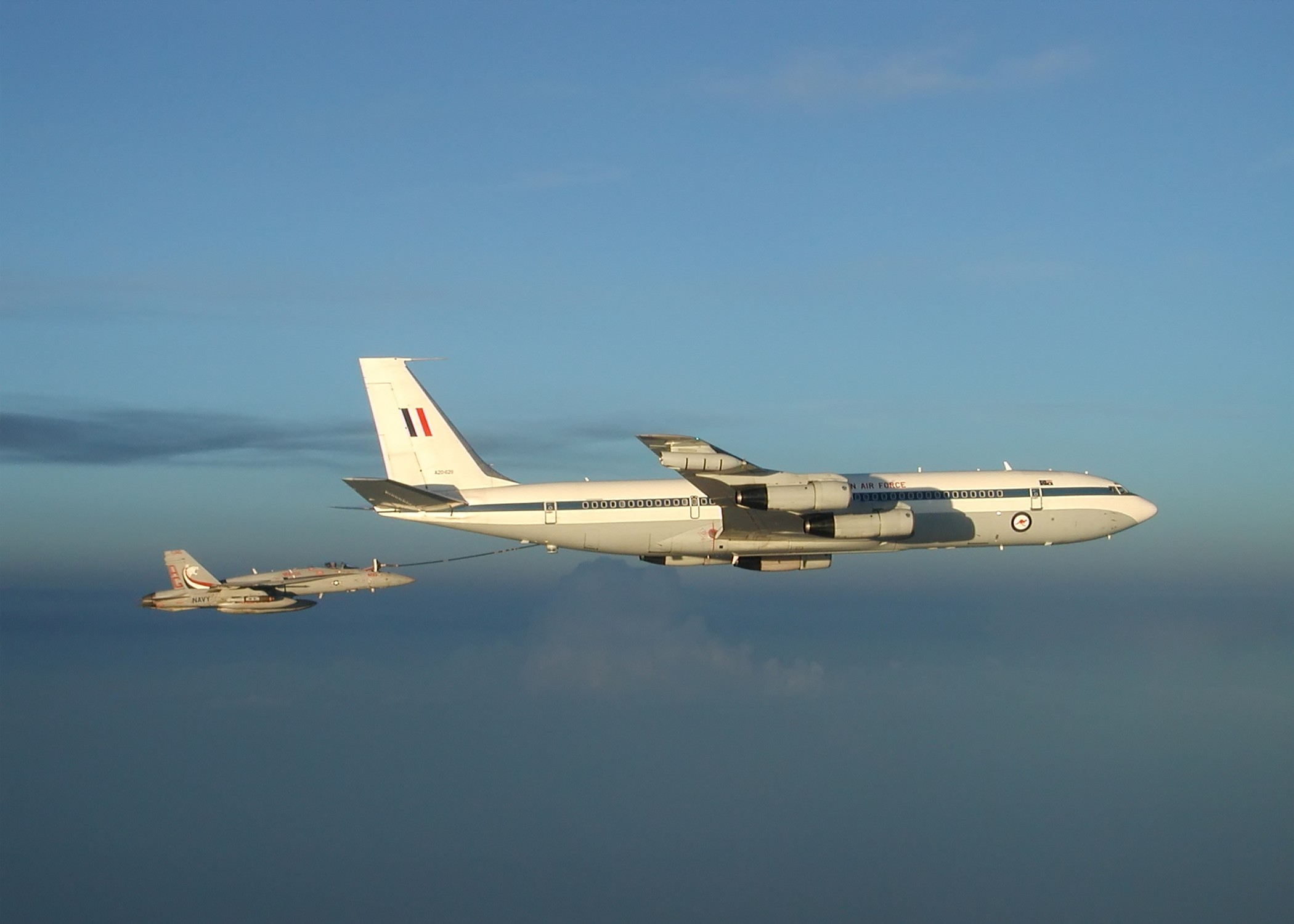
No. 33 Squadron Boeing 707 refuelling a US Navy F/A-18 Hornet during the war in Afghanistan, April 2002

On 1 July 1983, after the government procured two more 707s for $7.5 million from Worldways Canada, No. 33 Flight was reorganised as No. 33 Squadron under Grierson's command. Responsible for transporting VIPs such as members of the British royal family, the Governor-General, the Prime Minister, and the Pope, the 707 also became the first RAAF aircraft to land in the Soviet Union, the occasion being the funeral of Konstantin Chernenko in 1985. Along with Nos. 36 and 37 Squadrons, operating Lockheed C-130 Hercules, No. 33 Squadron came under the control of No. 86 Wing, part of the newly established Air Lift Group (later Air Mobility Group), in February 1987. Routine servicing of the 707s and Hercules was the responsibility of No. 486 Squadron, another component of No. 86 Wing. Qantas undertook heavier maintenance of the 707s at its jet base in Mascot. The RAAF acquired three more 707s on 25 February 1988, following a $25 million purchase from Boeing Military. One of the airframes was non-flying, for spares only, and was nicknamed "Hulksbury".

A consortium of Israel Aerospace Industries and Hawker de Havilland converted four of No. 33 Squadron's six serviceable aircraft to in-flight refuelling tankers between December 1988 and May 1992. Their probe-and-drogue configuration allowed them to refuel the RAAF's F/A-18 Hornets and the Royal New Zealand Air Force's Douglas A-4K Skyhawks, but not the RAAF's General Dynamics F-111 bombers, which required a boom system; the other two 707s continued to be used purely for long-range transport. The RAAF had argued for an air-to-air refuelling capability for both the F/A-18s and the F-111s, but the Australian government refused to fund the latter, considering the F-111's existing range sufficient for deterrent purposes. Observers such as journalist Frank Cranston speculated that aside from any cost issues, the government was concerned that extending the bombers' range would signal to the region that Australia was adopting a more aggressive defence posture.

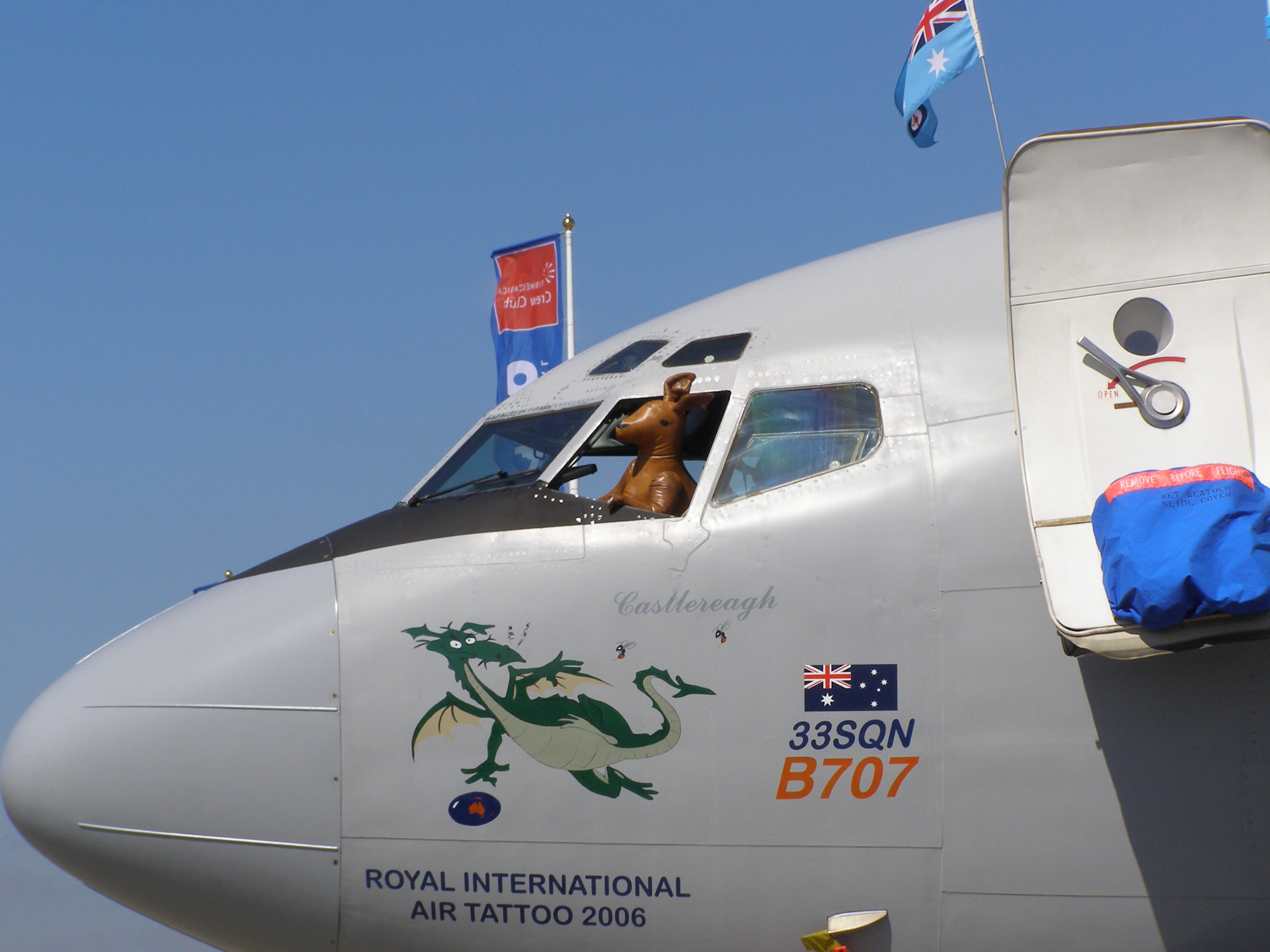
No. 33 Squadron Boeing 707 at RIAT, 2006

In April 1989, one of the 707s transported 300 Australian Army personnel in two flights to Namibia as part of the Australian contribution to UNTAG, the United Nations Transition Assistance Group policing the country's transition to independence. Later that year, the squadron helped ferry members of the Australian public when the two domestic airlines were grounded during an industrial dispute; it was similarly employed in 1991 following the demise of Compass Airlines. On 29 October 1991, one of the transport-configured 707s crashed into the sea during a training flight out of East Sale, Victoria; all five crew members were killed. The coronial inquest into this accident found that training in the asymmetric handling manoeuvre that caused the crash was deficient, and that the RAAF lacked a proper understanding of the handling characteristics of its 707s. The Coroner's first recommendation related to the need for appropriate simulation for this type of training, an area not properly recognised or addressed by the RAAF at the time. No. 33 Squadron transported Australian troops to and from Somalia as part of Operation Solace in 1993.

In January 1998, still based at Richmond, No. 33 Squadron joined Nos. 32 and 34 Squadrons under No. 84 Wing. Two of No. 33 Squadron's aircraft were soon employed to form No. 84 Wing Detachment A in Kuwait, as part of Operation Southern Watch. On 5 March, one of the 707s undertook the first operational aerial tanker mission since the squadron's re-formation in 1983, when it refuelled six Panavia Tornados of the Royal Air Force (RAF) over Saudi Arabia. The detachment subsequently refuelled US F/A-18 Hornets, Northrop Grumman EA-6 Prowlers and McDonnell Douglas AV-8 Harriers, and RAF British Aerospace Harriers, as well as the Tornados. From March to September 2002, two 707s formed No. 84 Wing Detachment as part of Australia's contribution to the war in Afghanistan. Located at Manas Air Base in Kyrgyzstan, the 707s provided aerial refuelling to coalition aircraft operating in the theatre, their efforts earning No. 84 Wing a Meritorious Unit Citation.

=== Re-equipment ===
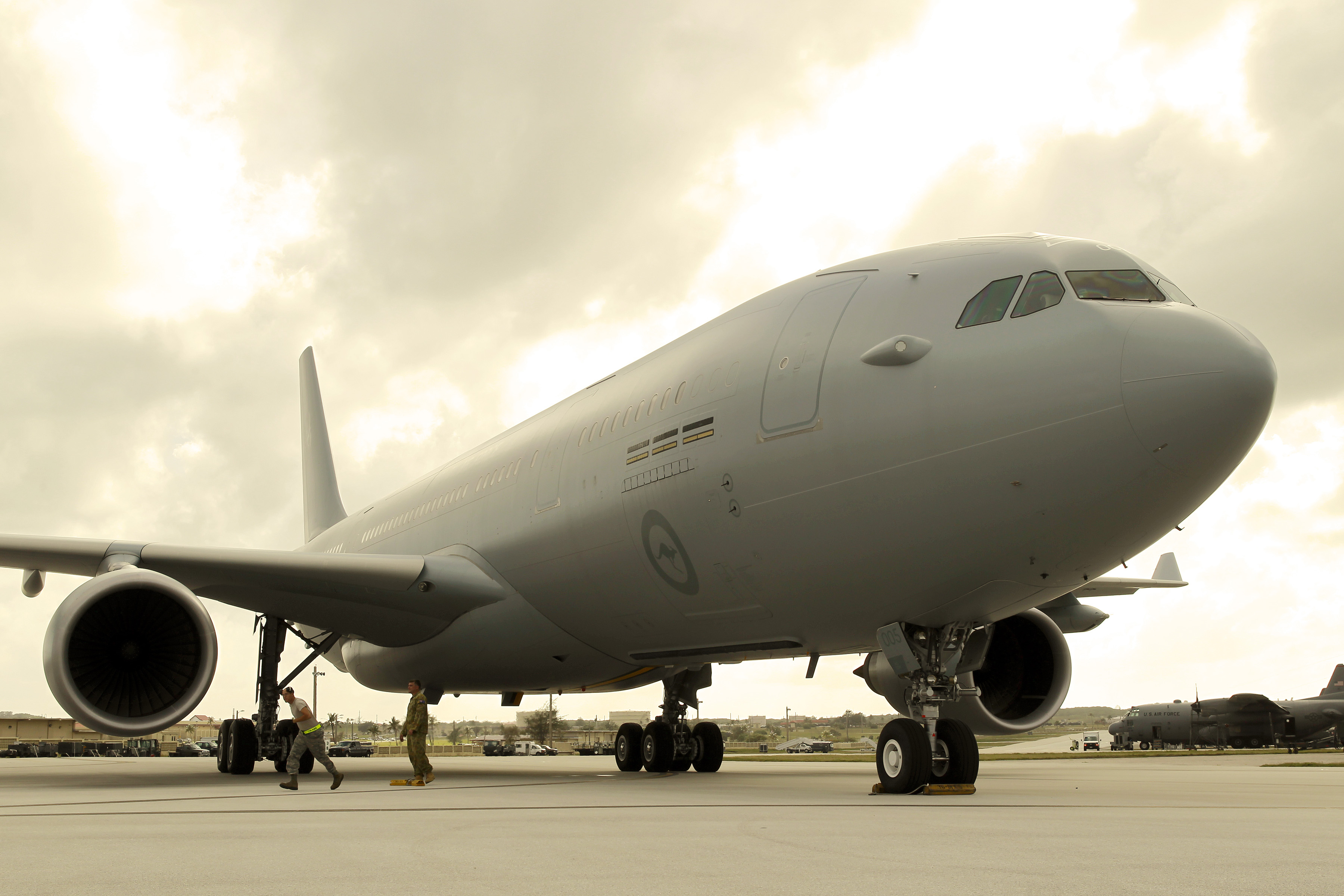
No. 33 Squadron Airbus KC-30 on a multi-national exercise in Guam, February 2013

By the mid-1990s, the ageing 707s carrying Australian VIPs overseas were no longer compliant with foreign noise and emission regulations. No. 33 Squadron relinquished its VIP transport role in 2002, following the entry into service of No. 34 Squadron's Boeing 737 Business Jets and Bombardier Challenger 604s. The squadron was awarded the Gloucester Cup in May 2007 for "its high levels of proficiency demonstrated over the year" in spite of the challenges of operating the obsolescent 707s, and for having "performed superbly on a number of high-profile missions". The 707s were retired in 2008, bringing to an end the 29-year operational history of the type in the RAAF. The last one in service, an ex-Qantas jet named "Richmond Town", made a low-level farewell flight over Sydney on 30 June in the company of smaller aircraft filming the occasion, which gave rise to fear in some quarters that a 9/11-style terrorist attack was in progress. Three 707s remained at Richmond until 2011, when they were flown out by their new operator, the US-based Omega Air Services; Omega also procured the RAAF's Boeing simulator, which had been operated by No. 285 Squadron.

Following the retirement of the Boeing 707, No. 33 Squadron relocated to RAAF Base Amberley, Queensland, on 1 July 2008. It was presented with a Squadron Standard by Queensland Governor Penelope Wensley on 2 June 2010, to commemorate "25 years of faithful and outstanding service". Having been without aircraft for three years, the squadron began re-equipping with the first of five Airbus KC-30A Multi Role Tanker Transports on 1 June 2011. The KC-30 could carry one-and-a-half times as much fuel as the 707 and was configured with both probe-and-drogue and boom delivery systems. These aircraft had originally been scheduled to enter service late in 2008, and the RAAF had to lease tankers from the United States Air Force and Omega Air to meet its aerial refuelling needs while Airbus rectified problems with the boom system and completed essential technical documentation. In March 2012, one of the KC-30s set a record for the number of passengers carried on an RAAF aircraft, 220 cadets from the Australian Defence Force Academy.

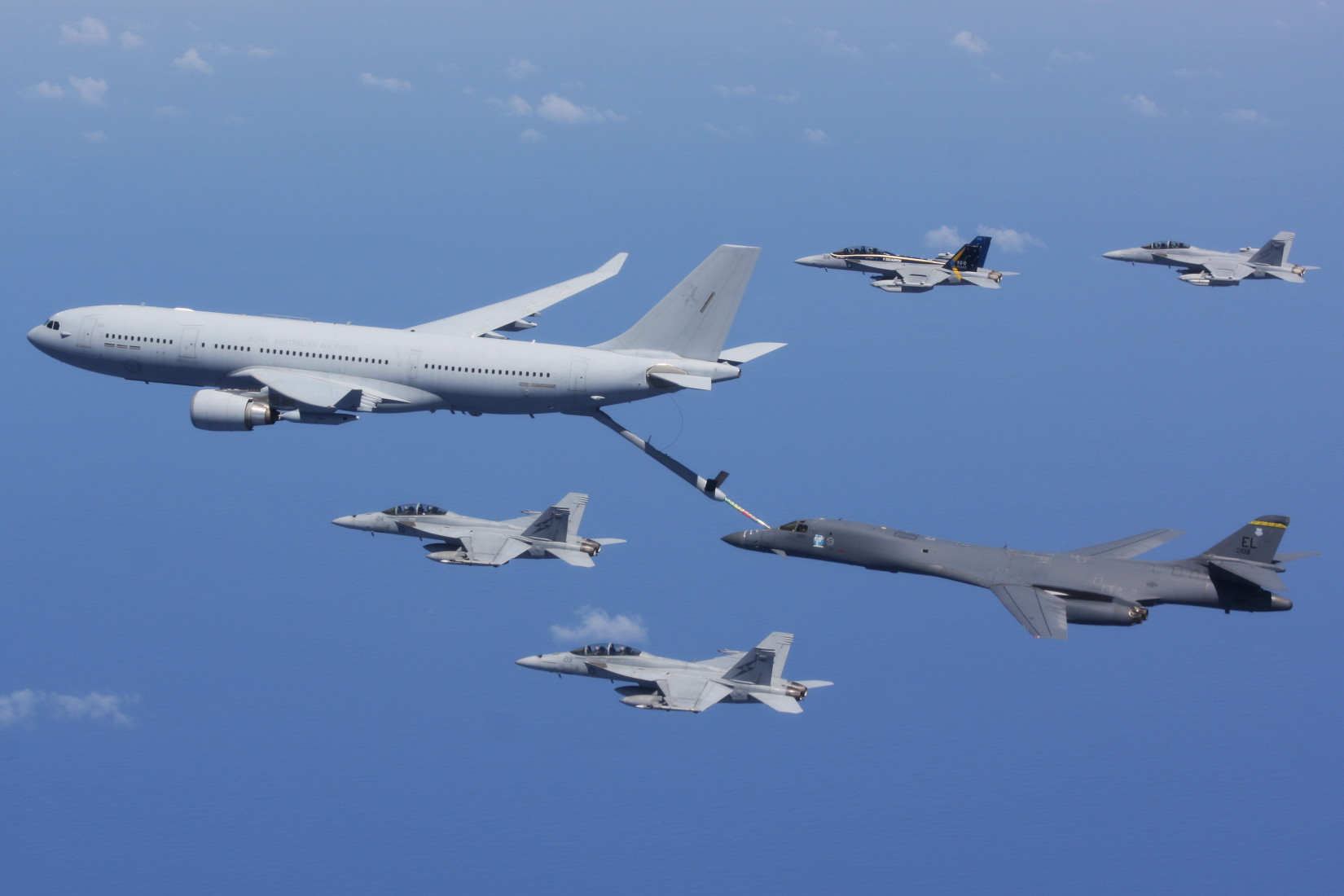
No. 33 Squadron KC-30 refuelling a USAF B-1B Lancer accompanied by RAAF F/A-18F Super Hornets and E/A-18G Growlers during an exercise in November 2017

The squadron received its fifth KC-30 on 3 December 2012, and achieved initial operating capability in February 2013. It expected to reach final operating capability, with both boom and probe-and-drogue delivery systems, in 2014. On 14 September that year, the Federal government committed to deploying one of the squadron's KC-30s to Al Minhad Air Base in the United Arab Emirates, as part of Operation Okra, Australia's contribution to a coalition to combat Islamic State forces in Iraq. The aircraft was only cleared for operations with the probe-and-drogue system, as by this stage the boom system was not ready. The KC-30 began flying missions in Iraq on 1 October 2014. The first successful contact using the boom system (in concert with another RAAF KC-30) took place near Amberley on 13 May 2015. In July, the Federal government announced the purchase of two more KC-30s, to increase No. 33 Squadron's fleet to seven aircraft; the airframes were to be ex-Qantas A330-200 passenger liners, converted by Airbus Defence and Space at Getafe, near Madrid. The KC-30 deployed to Iraq undertook the first operational use of the boom system in late October 2015, refuelling an RAAF E-7 Wedgetail.

In March 2016, No. 33 Squadron was awarded the Duke of Gloucester Cup as the RAAF's most proficient squadron of the previous year, as well as the RAAF Maintenance Trophy. It also received the 2017 and 2018 Maintenance Trophies. The unit's sixth KC-30 was delivered to Amberley in September 2017 and its seventh in May 2019, the latter aircraft having a VIP passenger-carrying capability to augment its aerial refuelling role. The VIP aircraft was fitted with first-class and business-class seats, as well as a conference room. In December 2018, Wing Commander Sarah Stalker assumed command of No. 33 Squadron, becoming the first woman appointed to lead a RAAF flying squadron in over a decade. The squadron completed its final Operation Okra deployment in September 2020; by this time its aircraft had flown 1,440 air-to-air refuelling missions in the Middle East, totalling over 11,000 hours flight time, and delivered in excess of 47,000 tonnes of fuel to Coalition aircraft.
