= MSA Koraaga =

History

Australia
- Name: Grozdana A.
- Owner: Anton Blaslov (1974-1990)
- Builder: Kali Boat Building and Repairs. 34 St Albans Terrace Semaphore Park 5019 South Australia,
- Launched: 1973
- Identification: IMO number: 7629166
- Fate: Sold to Royal Australian Navy in 1989

Australia
- Name: MSA Koraaga
- In service: 16 February 1989
- Out of service: April 2000
- Homeport: HMAS Waterhen
- Identification: IMO number: 7629166
- Fate: Sold in 2000

General characteristics
- Tonnage: 119 gross tonnage
- Length: 21.9 m (72 ft)
- Beam: 6.4 m (21 ft)
- Draught: 3 m (9.8 ft)
- Propulsion: 1 x Caterpillar D346 diesel engine. 470 bhp (350 kW).
- Speed: 10.5 knots
- Complement: 9 (RAN)

MSA Koraaga (1185) was an auxiliary minesweeper operated by the Royal Australian Navy (RAN). Built by Ante Franov ( Kali Boat Building and Repairs P/L ) Launched in 1973 as Grozdana A.' for Anton Blaslov, the vessel was operated commercially as a tuna-fishing boat until she was acquired under the RAN's Craft of Opportunity Program in 1990 for use as an auxiliary. During military service, she had a crew of nine.

Koraaga was sold for A$185,000 during a public auction in March 2000, to Klokan Fishing of Nelson Bay, New South Wales She was then renamed Venessa S and re commenced commercial fishing as a Tuna Longliner from 2000 to 2017. She hit rocks and sank at Cabbage Tree Island on the 20/6/2017
