= 1991 RAAF Boeing 707 crash =

Airplane crash

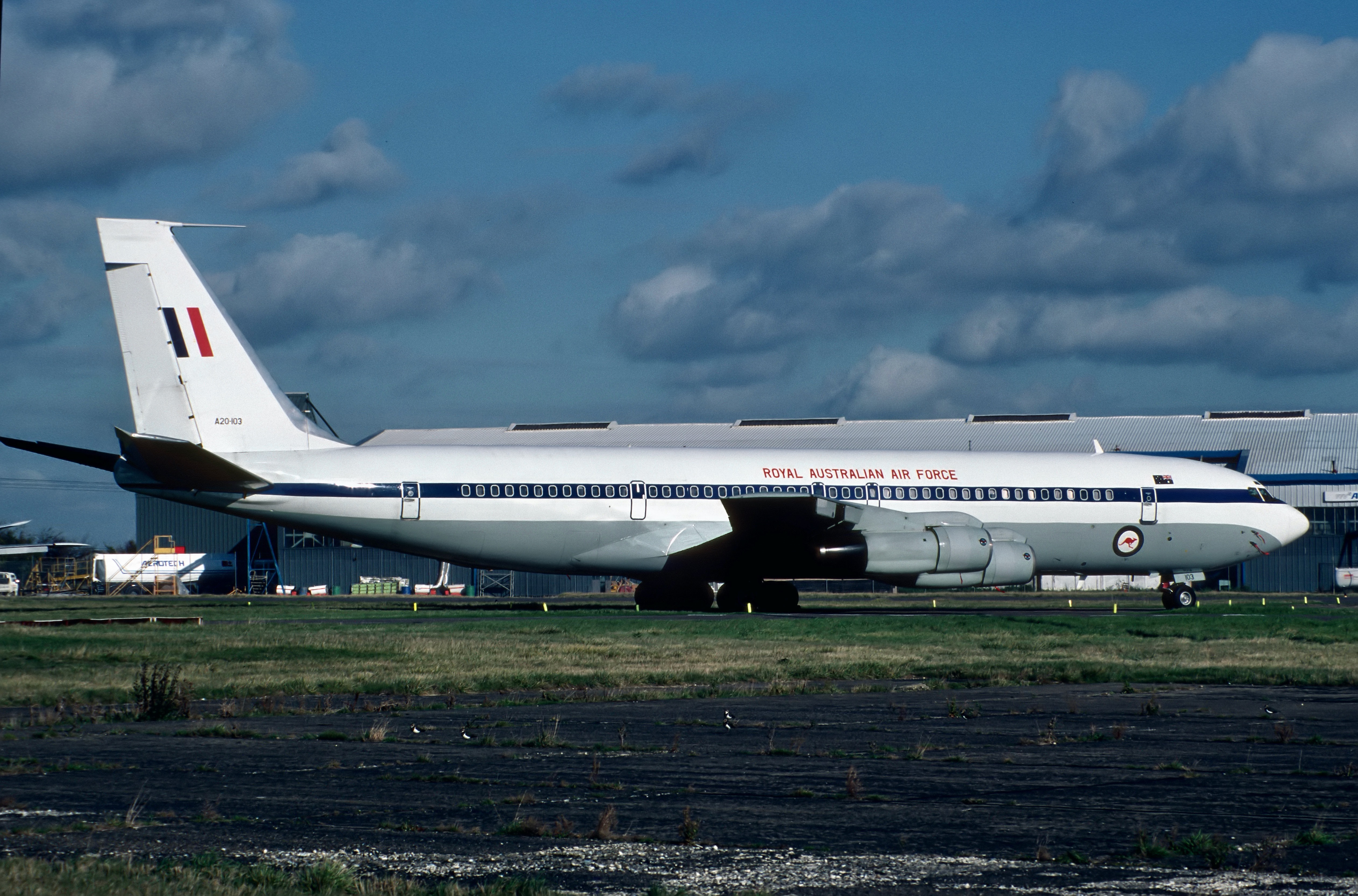
- A20-103, the aircraft involved in the accident, in 1990

Accident
- Date: October 29, 1991
- Summary: Loss of control
- Site: Near Woodside Beach, Victoria, approx. 43 km (27 mi) S of RAAF Base East Sale

Aircraft
- Aircraft type: Boeing 707-368C
- Aircraft name: Wilberforce
- Operator: Royal Australian Air Force
- Call sign: WINDSOR 380
- Registration: A20-103
- Flight origin: RAAF Base Richmond
- Destination: Avalon Airport
- Occupants: 5
- Crew: 5
- Fatalities: 5
- Survivors: 0

The 1991 RAAF Boeing 707 crash occurred on 29 October 1991, resulting in the loss of the aircraft and all five crew members. The aircraft, serial number A20-103 with the callsign Windsor 380, was on a training flight involving a demonstration of the aircraft's handling characteristics at minimum control speeds in a "double asymmetric" condition, with two of its four engines at idle power. During the non-approved manoeuvre, the aircraft stalled and entered a spin before crashing into Bass Strait off Woodside Beach, Victoria. The subsequent inquiry highlighted serious deficiencies in the RAAF's documentation and training, as well as operational knowledge of the aircraft type. It was the first fatal accident of a swept-wing jet transport in the country and remains the largest aircraft to have crashed in Australia.

== Aircraft and crew ==
The aircraft involved was A20-103, a Boeing 707-368C of 33 Squadron based at RAAF Base Richmond in New South Wales. It was originally delivered to Saudi Arabian Airlines in 1975 and purchased by the RAAF in 1988 for transport duties. It was named Wilberforce after the small town of Wilberforce, New South Wales, near the squadron's base.

The five crew killed in the accident were: Squadron Leader Mark Lewin (instructor pilot), pilots Flight Lieutenant Tim Ellis and Flight Lieutenant Mark Duncan, Warrant Officer Jon Fawcett (flight engineer) and Warrant Officer Al Gwynne (loadmaster).

== Background ==
On the morning of 29 October 1991, Windsor 380 was on a multi-leg training flight from RAAF Base Richmond to Avalon Airport on the outskirts of Melbourne. As the RAAF's only 707-rated Qualified Flying Instructor, Lewin was conducting conversion training to qualify Ellis, already a 707 captain, as an instructor on the aircraft type. Lewin's workload was further increased by the lasting effects of the 1989 Australian pilots' dispute, which resulted in many pilots leaving the Air Force for favourable pay and conditions in the airlines.

The training flight was intended to practice unusual situations that could not be achieved in a simulator due to limitations of software fidelity. This included asymmetric thrust conditions resulting from the loss of one or more engines at the same time. The flight departed Richmond at 1038 and proceeded normally to RAAF Base East Sale, where the pilots performed a touch-and-go landing with a simulated failed engine before continuing south towards the ocean at an altitude of 5000 ft.

== Accident ==
Lewin briefed the next exercise, which would involve flying the aircraft at the minimum controllable airspeed (V_{MCA}) with both engines on the left wing at idle thrust and without hydraulic assistance available to operate the flight controls. In this condition, aerodynamic loads on the rudder limited its travel to half of the normal deflection and required a very significant amount of force to be exerted on the rudder pedals by the pilot for a prolonged period to maintain control. In preparing for the manoeuvre, Ellis, the pilot under instruction, first turned off the rudder boost, configured the aircraft with flaps 25 and began reducing speed to V_{MCA}.

The flight engineer and instructor both expressed surprise at the reduced effectiveness of the rudder with the hydraulic boost disabled, but there was no discussion of discontinuing the exercise. Instead, as the aircraft slowed to 148 knots, Ellis banked the aircraft to maintain heading, placing the aircraft into a sideslip, and increasing power on the right-hand engines. At this point, the cockpit voice recorder (CVR) indicated Ellis was struggling with the physical workload required to maintain control, followed by Lewin telling him to "wrestle with the beastie!"

Shortly after, the pilots began to discuss how to "get out of" the situation; at around this time, the sound of the stick shaker could be heard on the recording as the aircraft stalled and entered a spin. The aircraft, now descending close to vertically, completed two full revolutions as the crew successfully attempted to re-engage the hydraulic rudder boost, but there was insufficient altitude remaining to recover and the aircraft impacted the sea about 1 km (0.62 mi) from the shore.

== Recovery and investigation ==
Initial rescue and recovery efforts were led by Victoria Police dive teams, who located the wreckage in 50 ft (15 m) of water and recovered one body. By the evening of 29 October, the Royal Australian Navy Clearance Diving Team One had arrived and assumed command. Given the shallow depth, the aircraft's flight recorders were quickly recovered. The search and recovery teams were supported by the auxiliary minesweeper MSA Brolga and the oil rig tender Canning Tide. The wreckage was found in three main pieces. The cockpit, empennage, three engines and large sections of the fuselage were recovered by 1 November. Despite an extensive search effort that lasted more than a week, Gwynne's body was never located.

The subsequent Board of Inquiry was tabled in the Senate in October 1992. It found that the instructor devised a demonstration of asymmetric flight that was "inherently dangerous and that was certain to lead to a sudden departure from controlled flight". A contributing factor may have been Lewin's considerable experience as a pilot and instructor in the Lockheed P-3 Orion, in which he had successfully performed similar asymmetric flight exercises many times without issue. The pilots likely did not appreciate that the handling characteristics of swept-wing jet aircraft in this flight regime provided much less margin for error. There were also broader organisational issues that factored into the accident, including a loss of operational knowledge as pilots left the air force faster than they could be trained. The board also found inadequacies in the research and documentation completed during and since the 707's introduction to service in 1979.

At the time of the accident, there was no official flight instructor's manual for the 707 and in the absence of a documented 707 QFI conversion course syllabus, information had been informally communicated between instructors. This situation had been compounded by the high resignation rate among pilots – the squadron's previous QFI posted out before Lewin, now No. 33 Squadron's officer in charge of training, had completed his own conversion. While Lewin was aware the lack of fidelity of the flight simulator meant such an exercise had to be conducted in the aircraft itself and had been shown it during his conversion training, the RAAF did not require it to be demonstrated as part of the training syllabus. Nor were there any documented procedures or limitations specifically related to asymmetric flight. It was the board's view that "the captain acted with the best of intentions but without sufficient professional knowledge or understanding of the consequences of the situation in which he placed the aircraft", also commenting that the captain did not act negligently nor knowingly place the aircraft in a dangerous situation.
