= Forgacs Shipyard =

Australian shipbuilding company

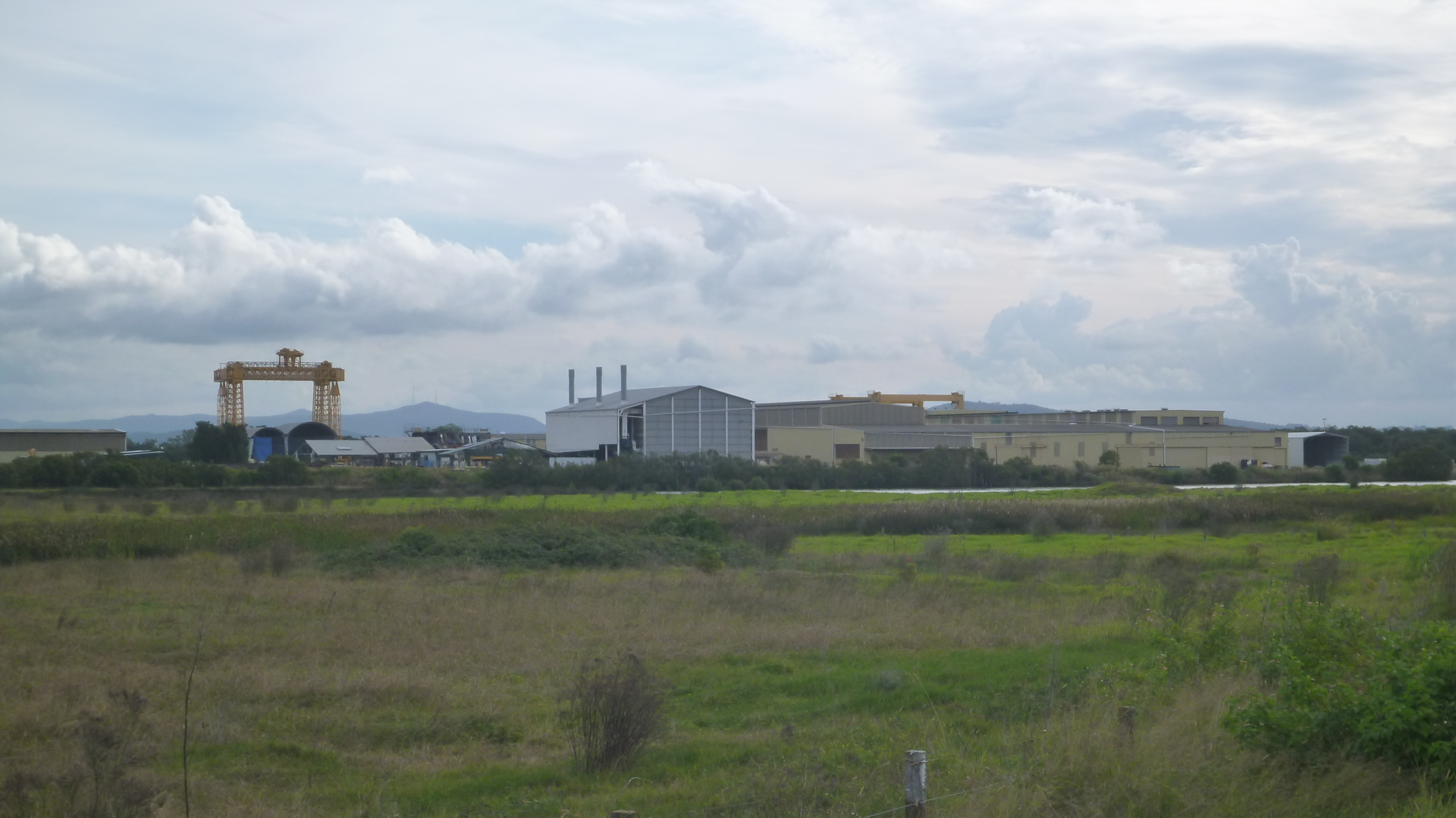
- Forgacs Shipyard seen from Laverick Avenue
- Formerly: Carrington Slipways
- Type: Private
- Industry: Shipbuilding
- Founded: 1957
- Founder: John Laverick
- Headquarters: Tomago, New South Wales, Australia
- Parent: Forgacs Marine & Defence

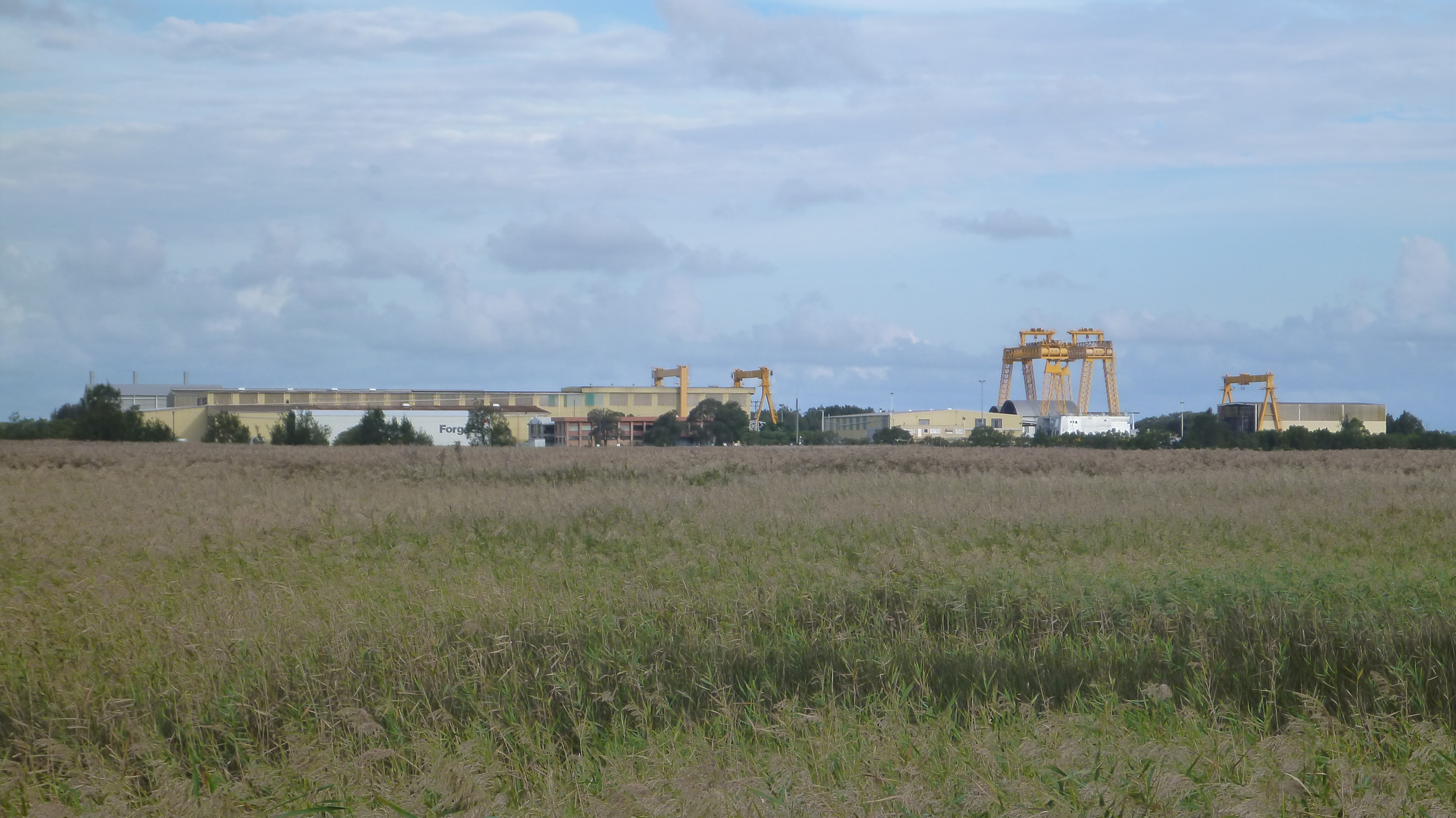
Forgacs shipyard seen from the Pacific Highway. The large cranes seen in the right of the image were built for construction of HMAS Tobruk

Forgacs Shipyard /ˈfɔːrdʒæks/ is a shipbuilding company located at Tomago, New South Wales on the Hunter River. It was originally opened in 1957 by John Laverick at Carrington as Carrington Slipways, and built 45 ships between then and 1968. By 1972, the business required larger premises and moved to Tomago, not far from the Pacific Highway. The shipyard was purchased by Forgacs Engineering in 1997.

Several First Fleet-class ferries were built at the Tomago yard. HMAS Rushcutter and HMAS Shoalwater were not built at either Carrington or the Tomago yard, but at Ramsay Fibreglass, a subsidiary company, 1.5 km (1 mi) from the Tomago yard.

== Ships built by Carrington Slipways ==
- Lady-class ferries
  - Lady Wakehurst (1974)
  - Lady Northcott (1975)
- Cruise vessel Captain Cook II (1975)
- HMAS Tobruk (1980)
- First Fleet-class ferries
  - Supply (1984)
  - Sirius (1981)
  - Alexander (1985)
  - Borrowdale (1985)
  - Charlotte (1985)
  - Fishburn (1985)
  - Friendship (1986)
  - Golden Grove (1986)
  - Scarborough (1986)
- Freshwater-class ferries
  - Narrabeen -1984
  - Collaroy - 1991
- Cruise vessel John Cadman II (1986)

Captain Cook Cruises - Lady Hawkesbury 1987

- HMAS Rushcutter (1986)
- HMAS Shoalwater (1985)
- Ferry Peninsula Princess (1987)
- Icebreaker Aurora Australis (1986)
- Cruise vessel John Cadman III (1988)
