= HMAS Shoalwater =

History

Australia
- Name: HMAS Shoalwater
- Namesake: Shoalwater Bay
- Builder: Carrington Slipways
- Laid down: September 1985
- Launched: 20 June 1987
- Commissioned: 10 October 1987
- Decommissioned: 14 August 2001
- Motto: "Beware"
- Fate: Decommissioned

General characteristics
- Class & type: Bay class minehunter
- Displacement: 178 tons full load
- Length: 101.7 ft (31.0 m)
- Beam: 29.5 ft (9.0 m)
- Draught: 6.6 ft (2.0 m)
- Propulsion: 2 Poyaud 520-V8-S2 diesel generators, 650 PS (478 kW)
- Speed: 10 knots (19 km/h)
- Range: 1,500 nautical miles (2,800 km; 1,700 mi) at 10 knots (19 km/h; 12 mph)
- Complement: 14 (3 officers)
- Sensors & processing systems: Radar: Kelvin Hughes Type 1006 navigational; Sonar: Atlas Elektronik DSQS-11M hull-mounted mine-hunting
- Armament: 2 × 12.7 mm (0.50 in) machine guns
- Notes: Taken from:

HMAS Shoalwater (M 81), named for Shoalwater Bay, was a Bay class minehunter of the Royal Australian Navy.

It was built by Carrington Slipways at its Ramsay Fibreglass facility in Tomago, launched on 20 June 1987, and commissioned on 10 October 1987. During sea trials, Shoalwater travelled to Townsville, where several charges were detonated around the vessel to test her tolerance to underwater explosions. Shoalwater performed above expectations during these tests.

Shoalwater was based at HMAS Waterhen, Sydney, where the RAN established a Mine Warfare Systems Centre ahead of the Bay class ships entering service, and she remained there for the duration of her service.

Shoalwater was decommissioned on 14 August 2001. Along with sister ship, HMAS Rushcutter, it was sold in 2002 for service in the Persian Gulf.
