= HMAS Rushcutter (M 80) =

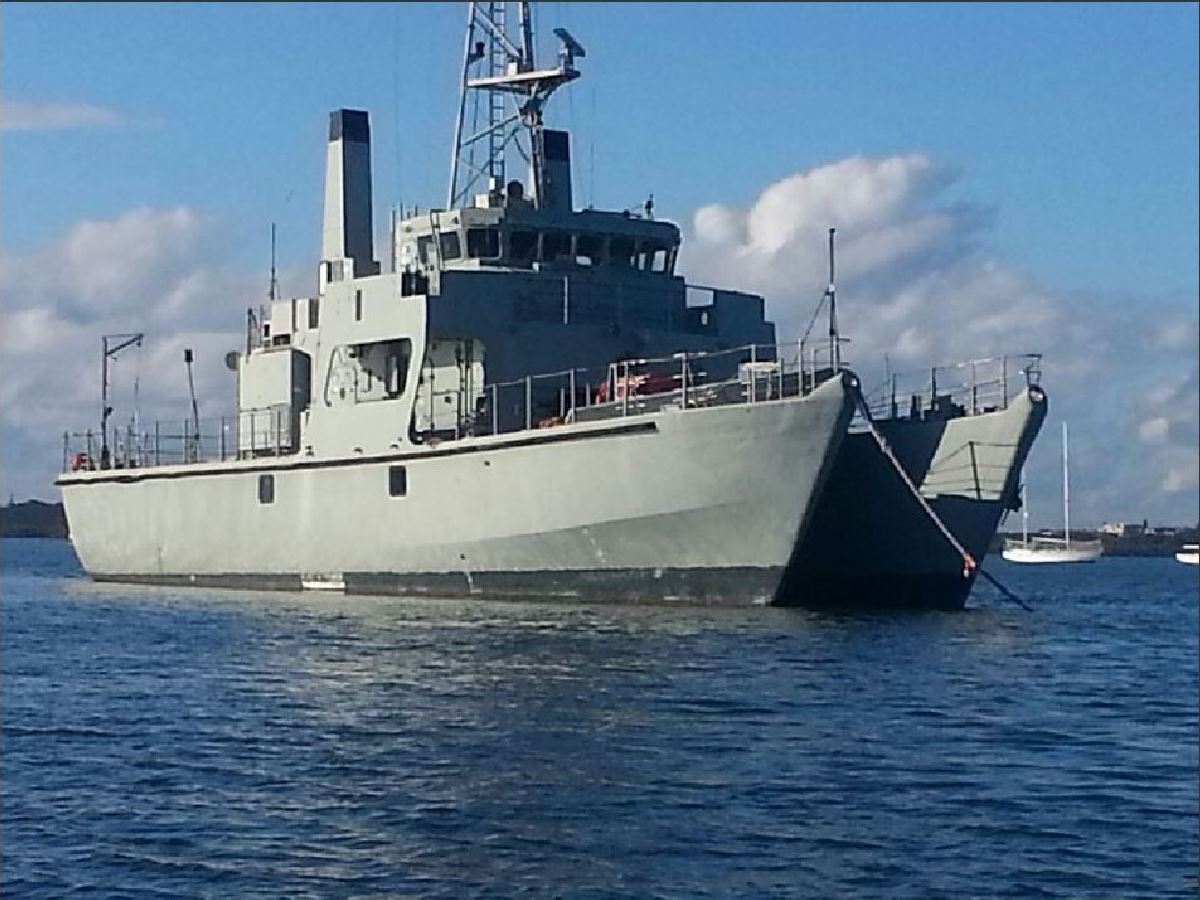
- The former HMAS Rushcutter on Botany Bay in June 2017

History

Australia
- Name: HMAS Rushcutter
- Namesake: Rushcutters Bay
- Builder: Carrington Slipways
- Laid down: August 1984
- Launched: 3 May 1986
- Commissioned: 1 November 1986
- Decommissioned: 14 August 2001
- Motto: "Effort Reaps Reward"
- Fate: Decommissioned

General characteristics
- Class & type: Bay class minehunter
- Displacement: 178 tons full load
- Length: 101.7 ft (31.0 m)
- Beam: 29.5 ft (9.0 m)
- Draught: 6.6 ft (2.0 m)
- Propulsion: 2 Poyaud 520-V8-S2 diesel generators, 650 PS (478 kW)
- Speed: 10 knots (19 km/h; 12 mph)
- Range: 1,500 nautical miles (2,800 km; 1,700 mi) at 10 knots (19 km/h; 12 mph)
- Complement: 14 (3 officers)
- Sensors & processing systems: Radar: Kelvin Hughes Type 1006 navigational; Sonar: Atlas Elektronik DSQS-11M hull-mounted mine-hunting
- Armament: 2 × 12.7 mm (0.50 in) machine guns
- Notes: Taken from:

HMAS Rushcutter (M 80) was one of two Bay class minehunters built for the Royal Australian Navy by Carrington Slipways at its Ramsay Fibreglass facility in Tomago. It was launched on 8 May 1986 and commissioned on 1 November 1986. It was decommissioned on 14 August 2001.

It and sister ship HMAS Shoalwater were sold in 2002 for service in the Persian Gulf. By 2013, it had been sold and returned to Sydney, being laid up in Rozelle Bay. By 2017 it was laid up in Botany Bay.
