= Craft of Opportunity Program =

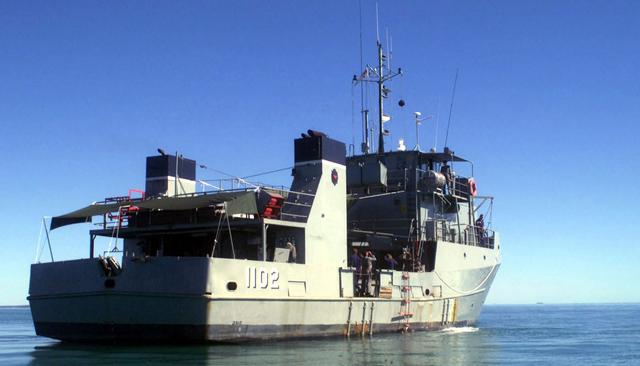
MSA Brolga in 2001. Brolga was a lighthouse tender acquired by the RAN under the Craft of Opportunity Program to serve as an auxiliary minesweeper.

The Craft of Opportunity Program (COOP) was a Royal Australian Navy (RAN) acquisition program intended to supplement the navy's mine warfare capability with civilian vessels that could be quickly converted into minesweepers. Vessels acquired under COOP were not commissioned into the RAN, and instead operated with the prefix "MSA" (Minesweeper Auxiliary).

== Acquisitions ==
COOP was initiated in 1985, to cover the gap in mine warfare capability caused by the decommissioning of the Ton-class minesweepers and delays in building their replacements, the Bay-class minehunting catamarans. In order to equip the auxiliary vessels, the RAN acquired several Klein Type 590 towed sidescan sonar arrays, along with Mini-Dyad magnetic influence sweep arrays, AMASS influence sweep arrays, and mechanical minesweeping gear. When the Bays were found to be poorly suited for minehunting work, the COOP vessels were kept on until the Huon class entered service, with some retained even later as a supplementary force.

Six vessels were purchased under COOP: Bermagui and Koraaga (ex tuna fishing boats), Brolga (a lighthouse tender), Gunundaal, and the Bandicoot-class minesweepers Bandicoot and Wallaroo (former Singaporean harbour tugboats). Another three trawlers, Salvatore V, Waverider, and Carole S, were chartered. Also acquired under the program were three drone ships, which could be operated from the auxiliary minesweepers. Although not directly a part of COOP, the Defence Maritime Services training ship Seahorse Horizon can also be fitted out as an auxiliary minesweeper.

== End of the program ==
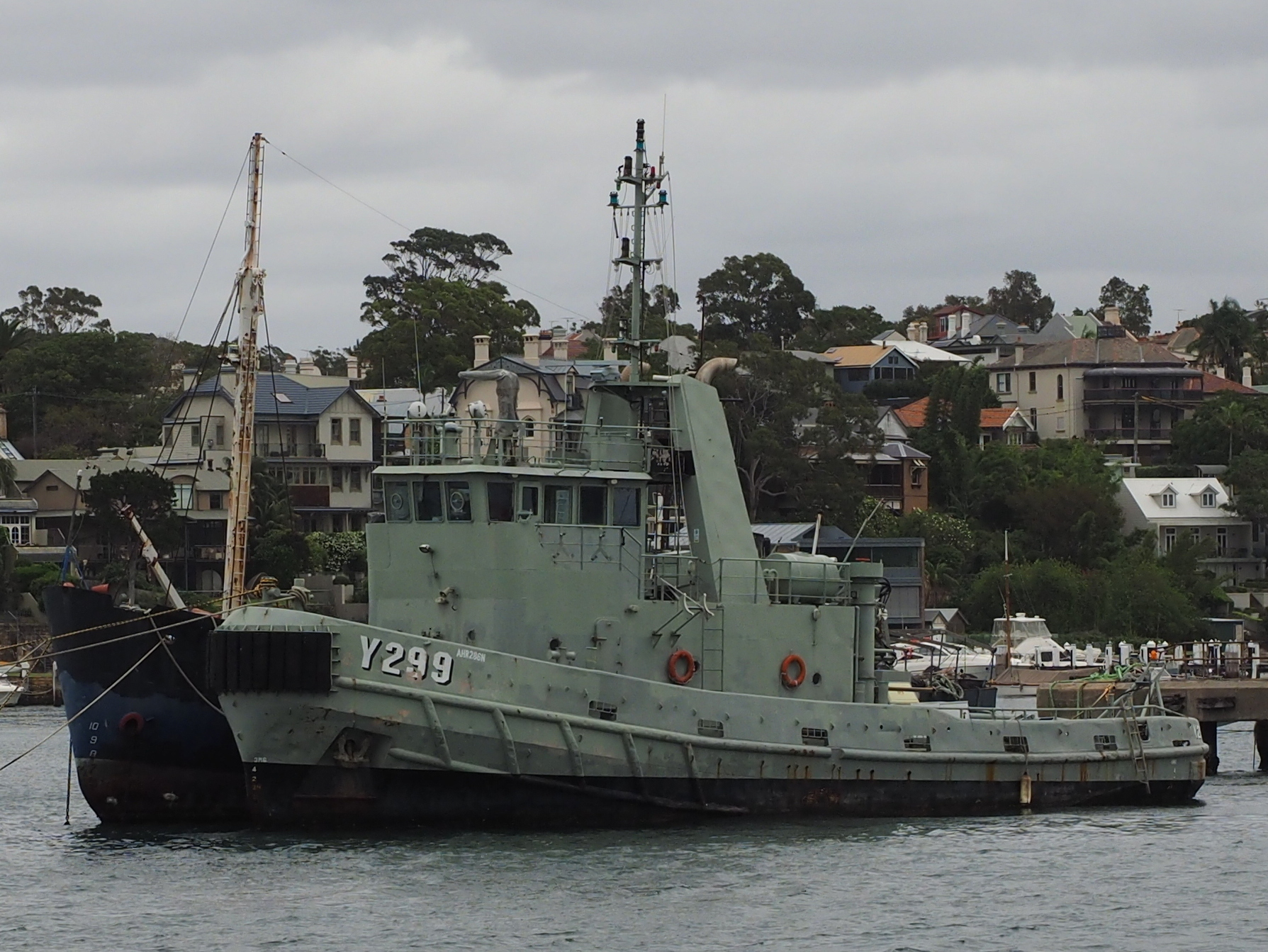
The former MSA Wallaroo in 2018

By 2012, most of the vessels have been sold or returned to their owners. Bandicoot and Wallaroo have not been operated as minesweepers since 2010, but were retained until 2014 to provide berthing support for nuclear-powered warships. The drones were not used from 2007.
