= HMAS Waterhen (naval base) =

Australian naval base

- Part of Fleet Base East
- Waverton, New South Wales in Australia
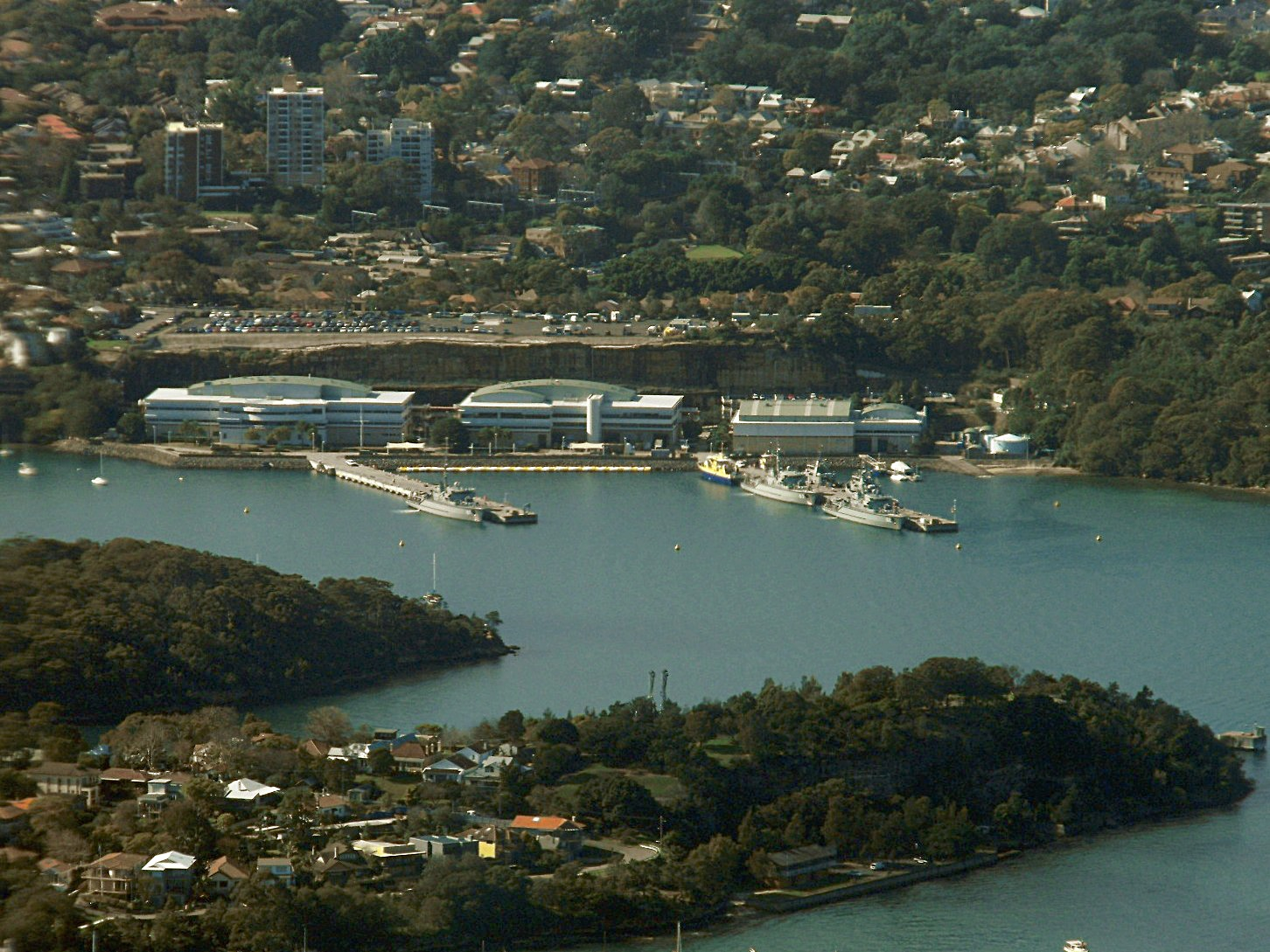
- HMAS Waterhen

Site information
- Type: Naval base
- Owner: Department of Defence
- Operator: Royal Australian Navy (1943–1967); Royal Australian Navy (1967 – present)

Location
- Location in Greater Sydney
- Coordinates: 33°50′28″S 151°11′40″E

Site history
- In use: 1943 – present

Garrison information
- Current commander: Lieutenant Commander Lucy Frauenfelder, RAN
- Past commanders: Commander Fiona Eggins, RAN Commander David Jones, RAN

HMAS Waterhen is a Royal Australian Navy (RAN) base located in Waverton on Sydney's lower north shore, within Sydney Harbour, in New South Wales, Australia. Constructed on the site of a quarry used to expand Garden Island in the 1930s, the location was used during World War II as a boom net maintenance and storage area. In 1962, the area was commissioned as a base of the RAN, and became home to the RAN's mine warfare forces. Waterhen was the first small-ship base established by the RAN, and from 1969 to 1979 was also responsible for the RAN's patrol boat forces.

== History ==
Prior to the 1930s, the area on which Waterhen is constructed was a large hill overlooking Balls Head Bay. In the 1930s, the decision to construct a graving dock and landbridge connecting the naval base at Garden Island to the mainland at Potts Point led to the quarrying of this hill for sandstone, which altered the geography to a sheer cliff-face and near-water level plateau. The site was populated with fibro buildings during the leadup to World War II, and during the war was used to store spare netting for the Sydney Harbour anti-submarine boom net. The area was under military control from 15 March 1943 until the end of the war: the first three months under joint Royal Australian Navy-United States Navy control.

The location reverted to a storage site after the conclusion of World War II, but in the early 1960s was earmarked as the future base for the RAN's minesweeping forces: six ex-Royal Navy Ton-class minesweepers and a Clearance Diving Team, with the base commander to simultaneously hold overall command over these forces. Commissioned into the RAN as HMAS Waterhen (following the Royal Navy practice of treating naval bases as 'stone frigates') on 5 December 1962, Waterhen was the first 'small-ship' base to be established by the RAN. At commissioning, there were minimal facilities available: the River class frigate HMAS Culgoa was relocated to the northern wharf in December 1952 and used as a barracks ship until June 1971.

In March 1969, following the introduction of the Attack class of patrol boats, the base's role was expanded to include command of the RAN's patrol boat forces: the base commander held the position of Commander Australian Mine Warfare and Patrol Boat Forces. The command roles were split again in 1979, with the command of patrol boat forces relocated to HMAS Cairns in Queensland. The 1980s saw an attempted upgrade to the minesweeper fleet with the development of the Bay-class minehunters, with the first two ships of the class, HMA Ships Rushcutter and Shoalwater assigned to Waterhen. The Bays did not enter service until 1993, and problems with their sonar and seakeeping ability saw the other four ships of the class cancelled and forced the RAN to rely on a force of minesweeper auxiliaries converted from acquired civilian vessels and also based at Waterhen until the development of the Huon-class minehunters in the late 1990s.

In 1994, the same year the Huon class project began, it was recognised by the RAN that the facilities at Waterhen needed to be upgraded. Over a period from December 1994 to December 1996, the entire base was levelled, with new buildings, wharves, and facilities installed. The upgrade cost A$70 million and was completed eight months ahead of schedule.

== Facilities and operational units ==
As of 2025, Waterhen is home to the Australian Navy Mine Warfare and Clearance Diving Group, which consists of:

- Clearance Diving Team One
- Two Huon-class minehunters
  - HMAS Diamantina
  - HMAS Yarra
- Several minor war vessels and commercially operated support vessels
  - Diving Tender Seal
  - Navigation training vessel Seahorse Mercator
  - Multi-role aircraft training vessel MV Sycamore

In addition, with the introduction of the Canberra-class Landing Helicopter Dock into the RAN, the ships associated Landing Craft have been based there, since their introduction in 2014.

Maintenance and the training program for the crews to operate the craft is also housed at the base.

- LHD Landing Craft School
  - 12 x LLC (LHD Landing Craft) LCM-1E, numbered L4401-12

Waterhen is also used as a base for minor war vessels visiting or operating temporarily from Sydney.

The first season of the television drama series Sea Patrol, which was primarily set on a Fremantle-class patrol boat, was filmed at Waterhen and the base was used to represent a fictional Australian naval base. Waterhen was used for the filming of several 'ashore' scenes, and was host to the decommissioned HMAS Wollongong, which was used to film scenes of the patrol boat docked at base.

== Gallery ==
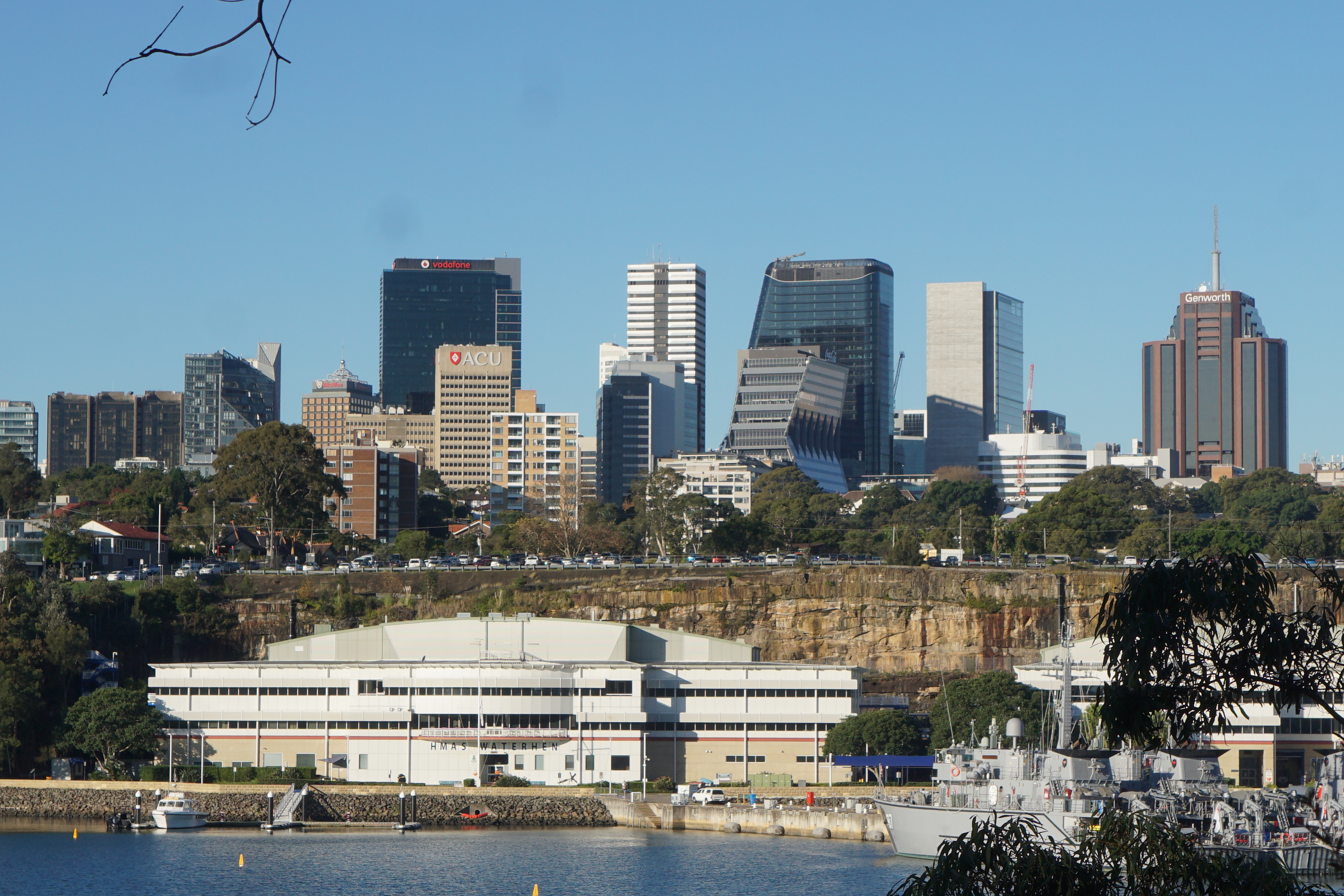
HMAS Waterhen with the North Sydney skyline in the background

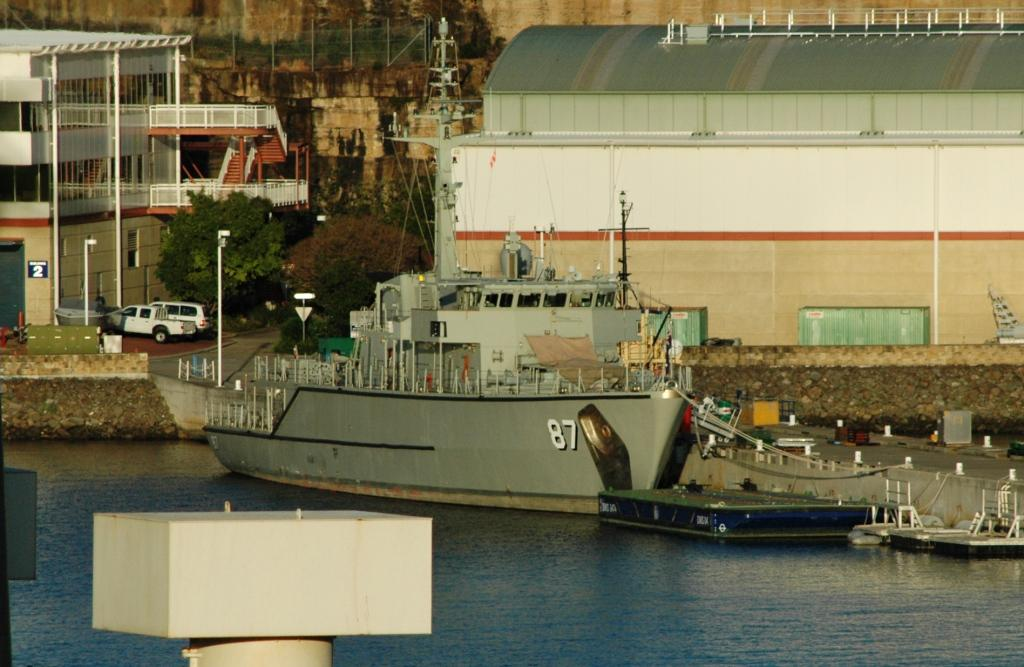
Huon-class minehunter HMAS Yarra docked at Waterhen in February 2008.

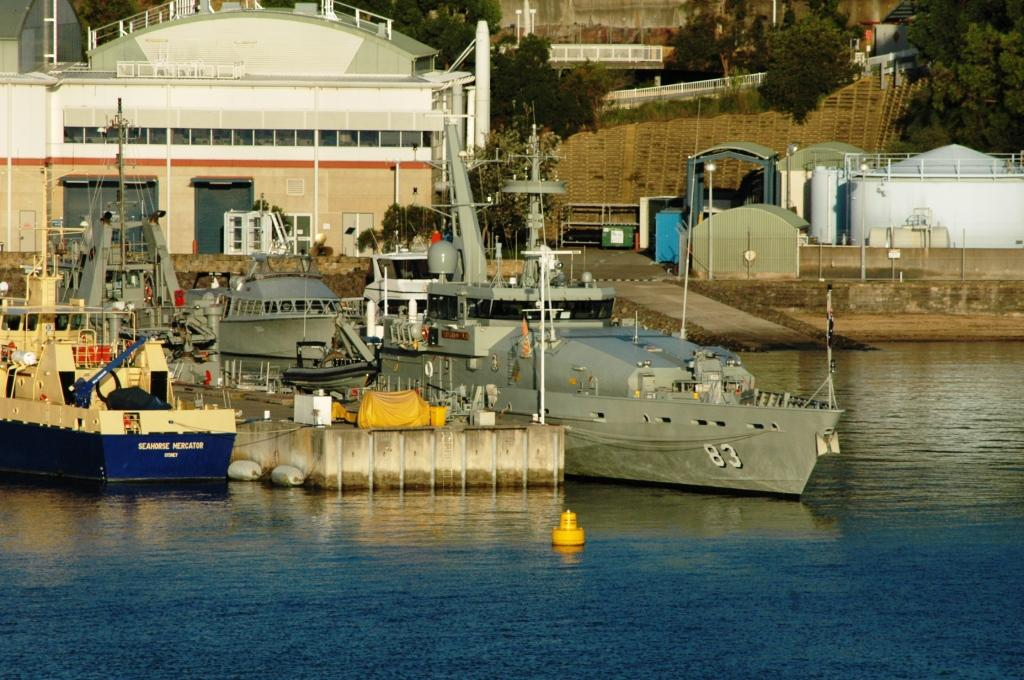
Armidale-class patrol boat HMAS Armidale visiting Waterhen in February 2008.

== See also ==
- List of Royal Australian Navy bases
