= MSA Bermagui =

Australian auxiliary minesweeper

History

Australia
- Name: Nadgee II
- Launched: 1973
- Fate: Sold to Royal Australian Navy in 1994

History

Australia
- Name: MSA Bermagui
- In service: 1994
- Out of service: 2000

General characteristics
- Tonnage: 110 gross tonnage
- Length: 19.9 m (65 ft)
- Propulsion: 1 x GM Detroit Diesel 12V71 diesel engine. 359 bhp (268 kW).
- Speed: 10.5 knots
- Complement: 8 (RAN)

MSA Bermagui (1121) was an auxiliary minesweeper operated by the Royal Australian Navy (RAN). Launched in 1973 as Nadgee II, the vessel was operated commercially as a tuna-fishing boat until March 1994, when she was acquired under the RAN's Craft of Opportunity Program for use as an auxiliary. During military service, she had a crew of eight. The ship left service in 2000. Bermagui was sold at auction for A$190,000 in April 2000, to Mosman Bay Boat Charters.
