= ST Brolga =

History
- Name: Llangwyn; Brolga; Albert San
- Owner: New South Wales Government Fisheries; Coastal Trawling Company
- Port of registry: Sydney
- Builder: Smiths Dock Company, South Bank
- Yard number: 593
- Launched: 17 November 1914
- Completed: January 1915
- Identification: UK Official Number: 152168
- Fate: Wrecked in 1926

Australia
- Name: Brolga
- In service: April 1917
- Out of service: February 1918
- Fate: Returned to owners in 1918

General characteristics
- Class & type: Castle-class naval trawler
- Tonnage: 219 GRT
- Length: 117 ft (36 m)
- Beam: 22 ft (6.7 m)
- Propulsion: Triple expansion engine

ST Brolga was an auxiliary minesweeper operated by the Royal Australian Navy (RAN). Brolga was operated commercially as a fishing boat until she was acquired in April 1917 for minesweeping duties during World War I. Brolga was returned to her owners in February 1918.

== Fate ==
Albert San was wrecked on 13 August 1926 and declared a total loss.
