= Bay-class minehunter =

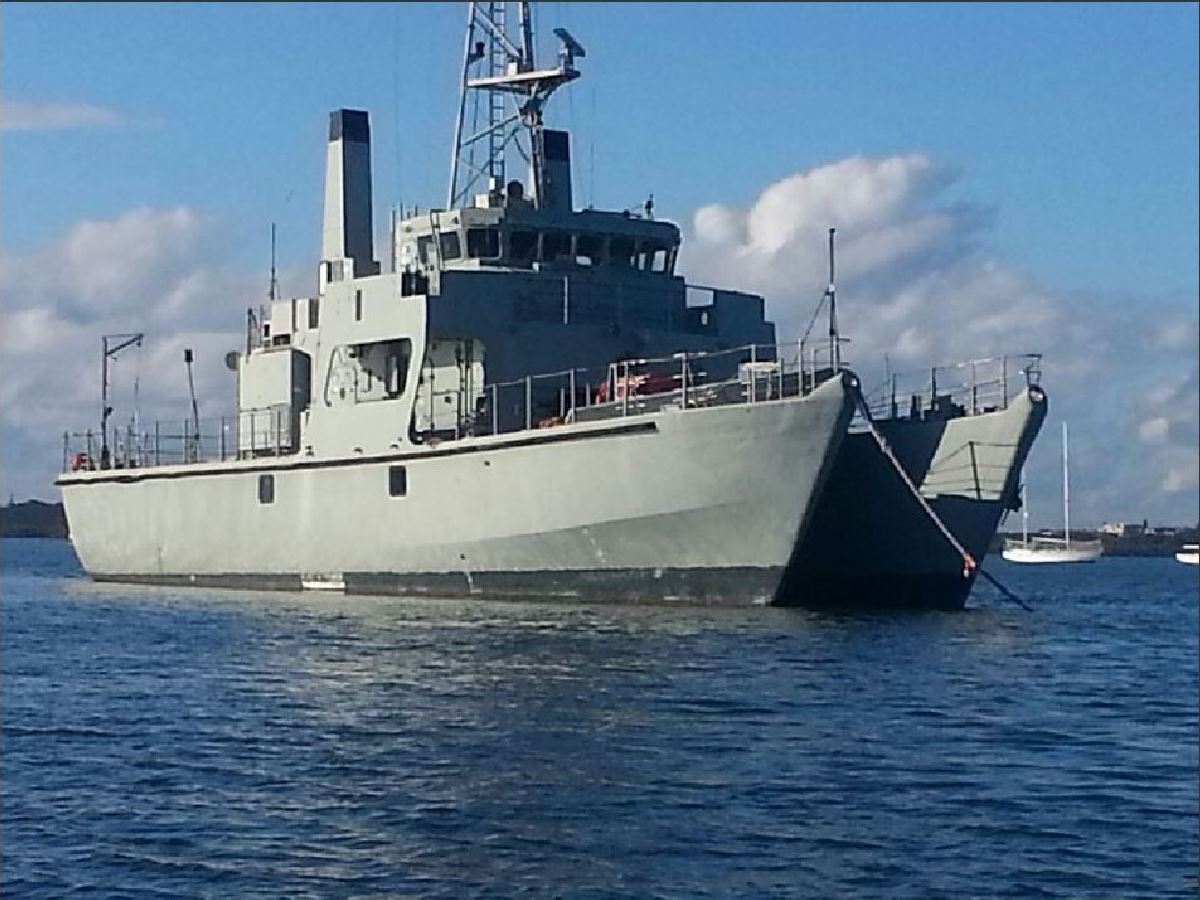
- HMAS Rushcutter on Botany Bay in June 2017

Class overview
- Operators: Royal Australian Navy
- Preceded by: Ton-class minesweeper
- Succeeded by: Huon-class minehunter
- In commission: 1986-2001
- Planned: 6
- Completed: 2
- Canceled: 4
- Retired: 2

General characteristics
- Type: Minehunter Inshore
- Displacement: 178 tons
- Length: 30.9 m (101 ft)
- Beam: 9 m (30 ft)
- Draught: 2 m (6.6 ft)
- Propulsion: 2 × Poyard 520-V8-S2 diesel generators; 650 hp(m) (478 kW); 2 Schottel hydraulic transmission and steering systems (one to each hull)
- Speed: 10 knots
- Complement: 3 officers, 10 crew
- Sensors & processing systems: Radar: Kelvin Hughes Type 1006; I-band; Sonar: Atlas Elektronik DSQS-11M; hull-mounted; minehunting; high frequency
- Electronic warfare & decoys: MCM: STN Atlas Elektronic MWS80-5 minehunting system (containerized); ECA 38 mine disposal system with two PAP 104 Mk 3 vehicles; Syledis and GPS precision navigation systems.
- Armament: 2 × remote control mine disposal vehicles; 2 × 12.7 mm (0.50 in) machineguns

The Bay-class minehunter were a class of catamaran-hull mine warfare vessels operated by the Royal Australian Navy from 1986. The class was an attempt to produce a locally designed inshore mine warfare vessel. Two prototype ships were ordered in 1981, with the first ship, HMAS Rushcutter, commissioned in November 1986.

The two ships experienced delays in construction, and the RAN resorted to acquiring six minesweeper auxiliaries (MSA) under the Craft of Opportunity Program to provide an interim mine-warfare capability, while also keeping Ton-class minesweeper HMAS Curlew in service until 1990, well beyond her intended decommissioning date. The ships did not enter service until 1993, due to problems with the sonar.

== Design and construction ==
One of the identifying features of this class is that vessels have a fibreglass hull constructed with a multi-layer foam sandwich core. No metal is contained in the hull.

The ships were built by Ramsay Fibreglass, a subsidiary of Carrington Slipways in Tomago, Australia. They were constructed in a purpose-built facility and then carried by crane a short distance south to a small man-made launching basin off the Hunter River. Work on a third hull commenced before the project's cancellation, but was never completed and remained at the rear of the facility until the early 2000s.

Although completed and commissioned in November 1986 (HMAS Rushcutter) and October 1987 (HMAS Shoalwater), the two minehunters were not formally accepted into naval service until June 1994.

== Deployment restrictions ==
The small size of the ships limited their ability at sea (deployable in conditions up to Sea State 3, but recommended to seek shelter in Sea State 4 or above), and prohibited regular deployment outside the Sydney-Newcastle-Jervis Bay area.

The 1991 Force Structure Review recommended no further ships be built, and that the two catamarans be restricted to training and operations in confined waters. Instead, the RAN focused on acquiring four to six coastal minesweepers (the Huon class), and maintaining the MSAs as an as-needed inshore mine-warfare force. Despite these restrictions, by the end of 1996, the two minehunters had been deployed to locations around Australia, with Rushcutter leaving the Sydney operational area on 15 occasions, and Shoalwater on 23 occasions.

== Fate ==
Both ships in the class were decommissioned on 14 August 2001. Four additional ships, to be named Westernport, Discovery, Esperance, and Melville, were planned but never constructed. The two ships were sold in 2002 for service in the Persian Gulf.
