= Korean War order of battle: Australia =

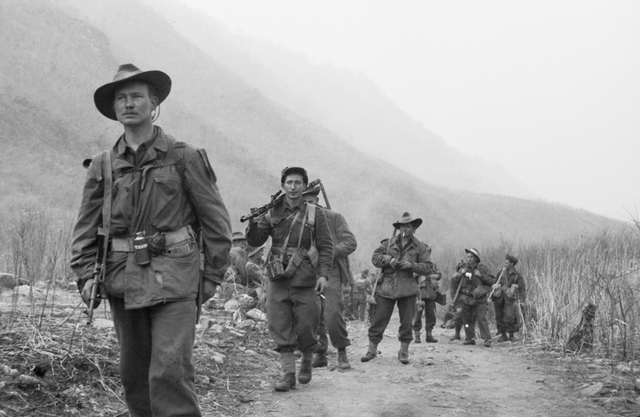
Soldiers from 3 RAR move forward in 1951

The order of battle of Australian forces during the Korean War consisted of one, and later two infantry battalions, naval forces of one aircraft carrier, two destroyers, and one frigate, as well as air forces consisting of one fighter squadron and one transport squadron. The first forces were committed in July 1950 from units based in Japan as part of the British Commonwealth Occupation Force, with Australia being the first UN member nation after the United States to commit elements from all three services. A total of 17,808 Australians served during the Korean War, including 1,193 members of the Royal Australian Air Force (RAAF), 5,771 from the Royal Australian Navy (RAN), and 10,844 from the Australian Army, with casualties including 341 killed and 1,216 wounded. Australian forces remained following the end of hostilities, with the last units finally departing in 1956.

== Australian Army ==
- Infantry:
  - 1st Battalion, Royal Australian Regiment (1952–53, 1954–56)
  - 2nd Battalion, Royal Australian Regiment (1953–54)
  - 3rd Battalion, Royal Australian Regiment (1950–54)
- Logistics:
  - Australian Forces in Korea Maintenance Area (AUSTFIKMA) (1950–56)

== Royal Australian Air Force ==
- No. 91 (Composite) Wing RAAF (1950–55)
  - Fighter/bomber:
    - No. 77 Squadron RAAF – North American P-51D Mustang / Gloster Meteor (1950–55)
  - Transport:
    - No. 30 Communications Unit RAAF – Douglas C–47 Dakota (1950–51)
    - No. 30 Transport Unit RAAF – Douglas C–47 Dakota (1951–53)
    - No. 36 Transport Squadron RAAF – Douglas C–47 Dakota (1953–55)
  - Other units:
    - No. 391 (Base) Squadron RAAF (1950–55)
    - No. 491 (Maintenance) Squadron RAAF (1950–54)

== Royal Australian Navy ==
- Aircraft carriers:
  - HMAS Sydney (1951–52, 1953–54)
  - HMAS Vengeance (1954)
- Destroyers:
  - HMAS Arunta (1954)
  - HMAS Anzac (1951, 1952–53)
  - HMAS Bataan (1950–51, 1952)
  - HMAS Tobruk (1951–52)
  - HMAS Warramunga (1950–51, 1952)

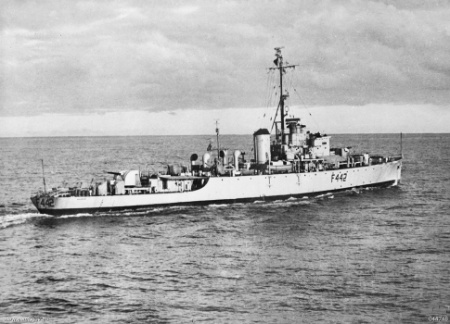
HMAS Murchison operating off Korea

- Frigates:
  - HMAS Culgoa (1953)
  - HMAS Condamine (1952–53, 1955)
  - HMAS Murchison (1951–52, 1953–54)
  - HMAS Shoalhaven (1950, 1954–55)
- Air squadrons:
  - 805 Squadron RAN – Hawker Sea Fury (1951–52, 1953–54)
  - 808 Squadron RAN – Hawker Sea Fury (1951–52, 1953–54)
  - 817 Squadron RAN – Fairey Firefly (1951–52, 1953–54)

== See also ==
- Australia in the Korean War
