= Australia in the Malayan Emergency =

1948–1960 British colonial war in Malaya

Australian involvement in the Malayan Emergency lasted 13 years, between 1950 and 1963, with army, air force and naval units serving. The Malayan Emergency (Anti-British National Liberation War) was a guerrilla war fought between Commonwealth armed forces and the Malayan National Liberation Army (MNLA), the military arm of the Malayan Communist Party, from 1948 to 1960 in Malaya. The Malayan Emergency was the longest continuous military commitment in Australia's history. Thirty-nine Australians were killed and 27 wounded.

The Australian Government sent Royal Australian Air Force Dakota transport aircraft of No. 38 Squadron and Lincoln bombers of No. 1 Squadron to Malaya in June 1950. The 2nd Battalion, Royal Australian Regiment (2 RAR), arrived in 1955. The battalion was later replaced by 3 RAR, which in turn was replaced by 1 RAR. In 1955, the RAAF extended Butterworth air base, from which Canberra bombers of No. 2 Squadron (replacing No. 1 Squadron) and CAC Sabres of No. 78 Wing carried out ground attack missions against the guerillas.

The Royal Australian Navy destroyers Warramunga and Arunta joined the force in June 1955. Between 1956 and 1960, the aircraft carriers Melbourne and Sydney and destroyers Anzac, Quadrant, Queenborough, Quiberon, Quickmatch, Tobruk, Vampire, Vendetta and Voyager were attached to the Commonwealth Strategic Reserve forces for three to nine months at a time. Several of the destroyers fired on Communist positions in Johor State.

In 1973 an Australian Army infantry company, known as Rifle Company Butterworth, was deployed to RAAF Base Butterworth to provide a protective and quick-reaction force for the base during a resurgence of the Communist insurgency in Malaysia. While the base was handed to the Royal Malaysian Air Force in 1988 and the insurgency officially ended in 1989, Rifle Company Butterworth was maintained as a means of providing Australian soldiers with training in jungle warfare and cross-training with the Malaysian Army.
