= RAAF Transport Flight (Japan) =

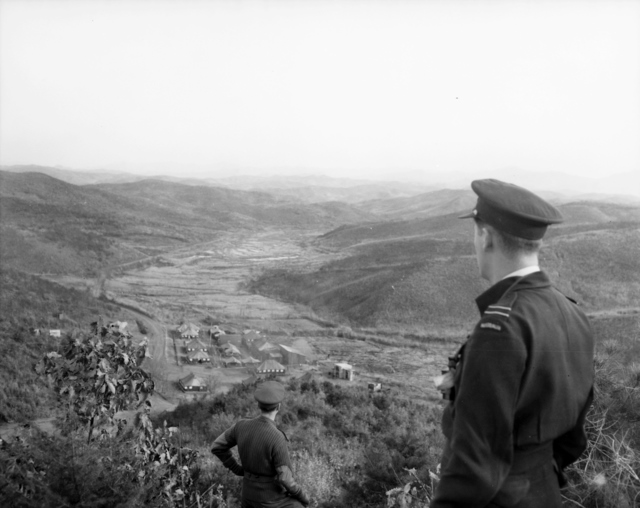
- A member of RAAF Transport Flight (Japan) on a visit to Australian forces serving on the Korean Armistice line looks across the demilitarised zone towards Communist positions
- Active: 1955–1956
- Country: Australia
- Branch: Royal Australian Air Force
- Role: Transport
- Size: Four aircraft
- Part of: No. 91 Wing (1955)
- Headquarters: Iwakuni, Japan
- Nickname(s): "Japan–Korea Airlines"

Aircraft flown
- Transport: C-47 Dakota; CAC Wirraway

Transport Flight (Japan) was a Royal Australian Air Force (RAAF) transport unit that operated in the aftermath of the Korean War. It was formed in March 1955 at Iwakuni, Japan, and equipped with three Douglas C-47 Dakotas and a CAC Wirraway. The flight's main duty was flying a regular courier service between Japan and South Korea in support of Commonwealth military units based on the peninsula. Transport Flight (Japan) ceased operations in June 1956 and disbanded in September that year.

== History ==
Transport Flight (Japan) traced its lineage to a transport contingent that the Royal Australian Air Force (RAAF) maintained in Japan before the Korean War. When the war broke out in June 1950, No. 77 (Fighter) Squadron was based at Iwakuni as part of the British Commonwealth Occupation Force. Equipped primarily with North American P-51 Mustangs, the squadron also operated a communications flight of two Douglas C-47 Dakotas and two Austers. No. 91 (Composite) Wing was established at Iwakuni in October 1950 to administer all RAAF units during the war. This included No. 77 Squadron, the newly formed No. 391 (Base) Squadron and No. 491 (Maintenance) Squadron, and No. 30 Communications Flight, formerly the No. 77 Squadron Communications Flight. It was designated No. 30 Communications Unit in November. By then it had a complement of eight Dakotas and two Austers. No. 30 Communications Unit was redesignated No. 30 Transport Unit in November 1951. By the end of 1952, its strength was eight Dakotas and one CAC Wirraway, and fifty-nine personnel.

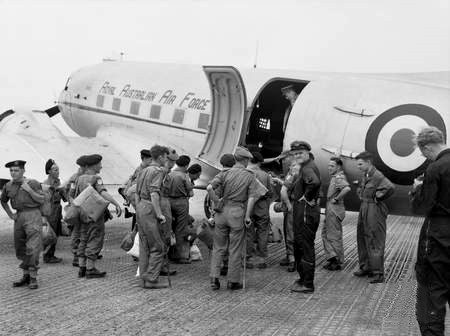
Former prisoners of war board a Dakota of No. 36 Squadron in Seoul, South Korea, August 1953

In March 1953, No. 30 Transport Unit re-formed as No. 36 (Transport) Squadron, which had disbanded the previous day at RAAF Base Richmond, New South Wales. Elements of No. 36 Squadron began returning to Australia in January 1955, and by the end of the month its strength was four Dakotas and one Wirraway, and fifty-eight personnel. No. 36 Squadron ceased flying on 13 March, after which its remaining strength left Iwakuni for Australia. RAAF Transport Flight (Japan) was formed at Iwakuni the next day under the control of No. 91 Wing. The unit was equipped with three Dakotas and one Wirraway, which had been left behind when the last members of No. 36 Squadron departed for Australia. Transport Flight (Japan)'s personnel, consisting of eight officers and sixty-six other ranks by the end of month, were drawn mainly from No. 36 Squadron, including its commanding officer, Squadron Leader G.L. Waller, as well as from No. 391 (Base) Squadron.

The flight's regular duty consisted of a courier service to Pusan and Kimpo in South Korea five days a week—Wednesdays and Sundays were excluded—to support Commonwealth forces on the peninsula. It became known in the process as "Japan–Korea Airlines". Generally carrying freight on the outbound journey, the aircraft often ferried casualties back to Iwakuni, and two nurses formerly of No. 391 Squadron were attached to the flight to assist with this task. The unit was also responsible for transporting VIPs. No. 391 Squadron and No. 91 Wing were disbanded at Iwakuni on 30 April 1955. Transport Flight (Japan) flew its last courier missions on 28 June 1956, and shortly after handed over its base facilities to the United States Navy. The flight's last Dakota—the last RAAF aircraft to be based in Japan—took off for Australia from Iwakuni on 8 July. It left behind some ground staff and Flight Lieutenant Raleigh, a small yellow dog that had accompanied No. 81 (Fighter) Wing—parent formation of No. 77 Squadron at the time—to Japan as its mascot in 1945 and had remained with the RAAF contingent at Iwakuni ever since. Raleigh, a keen flyer but considered too old to return to Australia, was to be given over to the care of a US service family when the last RAAF personnel departed Iwakuni. Transport Flight (Japan) was disbanded on 28 September 1956. It was reported to have carried 4,400 passengers and 610,000 pounds (280,000 kg) of cargo between its first flight in March 1955 and its last in July 1956, including 690 Commonwealth troops in April 1956 alone, and to have only missed one scheduled service, owing to a typhoon.
