= Anzac II =

Anzac II may refer to:

- HMS Anzac II, a trawler operated as an auxiliary minesweeper by the Royal Navy during World War I
- HMAS Anzac (D59), a destroyer of the Royal Australian Navy operated from 1951 to 1974, and the second ship to be named HMAS Anzac
- II Anzac Corps or Second Anzac Corps, a combined Australian-New Zealand army corps existing from 1916 to 1917
