= Korean Air Flight 1533 =

1999 aviation accident

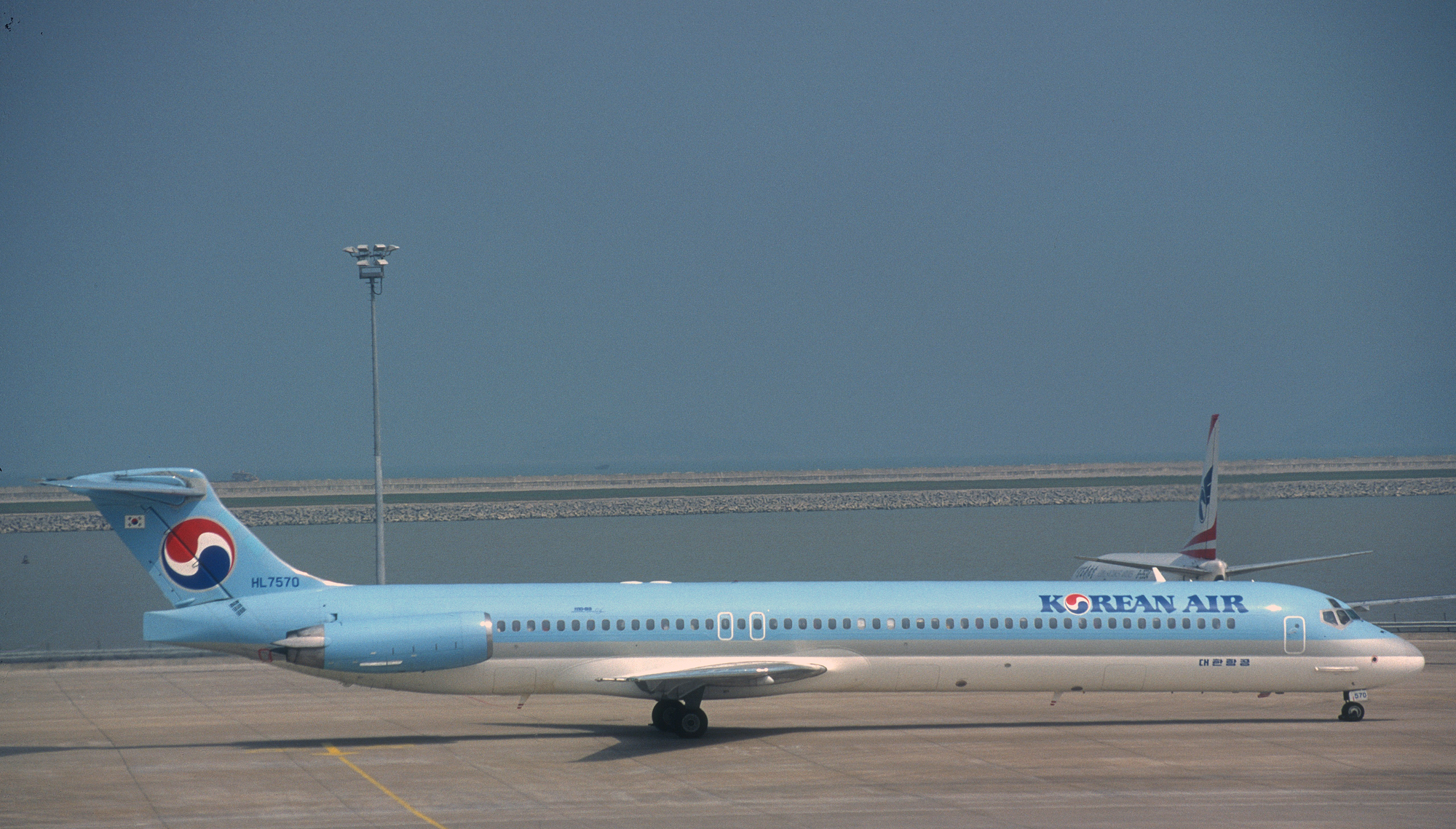
- HL7570, the aircraft involved in the accident, seen in 1997

Accident
- Date: March 15, 1999
- Summary: Runway overrun caused by pilot error
- Site: Pohang Airport, Pohang, South Korea

Aircraft
- Aircraft type: McDonnell Douglas MD-83
- Operator: Korean Air
- Call sign: KOREAN AIR 1533
- Registration: HL7570
- Flight origin: Gimpo International Airport, Seoul
- Destination: Pohang Airport, Pohang
- Occupants: 156
- Passengers: 150
- Crew: 6
- Fatalities: 0
- Injuries: 76
- Survivors: 156

Korean Air Flight 1533 was a domestic passenger flight from Gimpo International Airport to Pohang Airport. On March 15, 1999, the McDonnell Douglas MD-83 operating the flight overshot runway 10 during landing at Pohang Airport. All 156 people on board survived, but the aircraft was destroyed.

== Accident ==
The aircraft, carrying 156 passengers and crew, departed Gimpo International Airport. During landing at Pohang Airport, the aircraft had to initiate a go-around due to rain and thick clouds.

During the second landing, the aircraft landed 1,500 feet (460 m) past the threshold of runway 10. For unknown reasons, the flight crew did not activate the thrust reversers until 27 seconds after touchdown, resulting in the aircraft being unable to stop in time. The aircraft overshot the runway, striking 10 antennas and a barbed wire fence in the process, and then crashed into an embankment, with the fuselage breaking into two pieces. There were no fatalities, but 76 passengers were injured. There were heavy winds at the time of the accident. The aircraft was damaged beyond repair and was declared a hull loss, making the accident the 11th hull loss of an McDonnell Douglas MD-80.

== Investigation ==
The Ministry of Construction and Transportation, and the Republic of Korea Navy both investigated the accident. The cause of the accident was determined to be pilot error due to the flight crew's delayed activation of the thrust reversers, the late touch down, and failing to initiate a second go-around.

== See also ==
- Jeju Air Flight 2216 another aviation accident in South Korea, in which the aircraft impacted ILS Equipment after overshooting the runway.
- American Airlines Flight 1420
- Delta Air Lines Flight 1086
