= No. 91 Wing RAAF =

Royal Australian Air Force composite wing

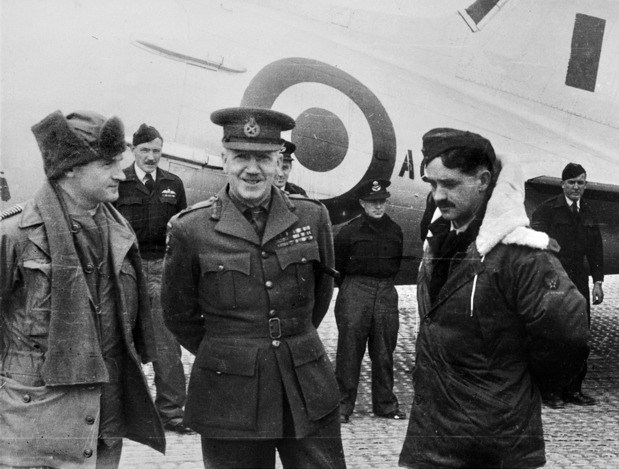
- Officer Commanding No. 91 Wing, Group Captain Charlton (left), Commanding Officer No. 77 Squadron, Squadron Leader Cresswell (right), and members of No. 30 Communications Unit with Lieutenant General Robertson in South Korea, December 1950
- Active: 1950–1955
- Country: Australia
- Branch: Royal Australian Air Force
- Type: Composite wing
- Headquarters: Iwakuni, Japan
- Engagements: Korean War

Aircraft flown
- Fighter: P-51 Mustang; Gloster Meteor
- Transport: C-47 Dakota; Auster; CAC Wirraway

No. 91 (Composite) Wing was a Royal Australian Air Force (RAAF) wing that operated during the Korean War and its immediate aftermath. It was established in October 1950 to administer RAAF units deployed in the conflict: No. 77 (Fighter) Squadron, flying North American P-51 Mustangs; No. 30 Communications Flight, flying Austers and Douglas C-47 Dakotas; No. 391 (Base) Squadron; and No. 491 (Maintenance) Squadron. The wing was headquartered at Iwakuni, Japan, as were its subordinate units with the exception of No. 77 Squadron, which was based in Korea and came under the operational control of the United States Fifth Air Force.

No. 30 Communications Flight was re-designated No. 30 Communications Unit in November 1950, and No. 30 Transport Unit a year later, before re-forming as No. 36 (Transport) Squadron in March 1953. It undertook medical evacuation, cargo and troop transport, and courier flights. No. 77 Squadron converted to Gloster Meteor jets between April and July 1951, and operated primarily in the ground attack role from December that year. It remained in Korea on garrison duty following the July 1953 armistice, and returned to Australia in November 1954; No. 491 Squadron disbanded the same month. No. 36 Squadron returned to Australia in March 1955, leaving four aircraft to equip the newly formed RAAF Transport Flight (Japan), which briefly came under No. 91 Wing's control. The following month, No. 391 Squadron and No. 91 Wing headquarters were disbanded.

== History ==
=== Origins and formation ===
When the Korean War broke out on 25 June 1950, No. 77 (Fighter) Squadron of the Royal Australian Air Force (RAAF) was based at Iwakuni, Japan. For the previous four years, equipped mainly with North American P-51 Mustangs, it had served with the British Commonwealth Air Group, the air component of the British Commonwealth Occupation Force (BCOF), initially as part of No. 81 Wing RAAF. No. 81 Wing was disbanded in November 1948, leaving No. 77 Squadron as Australia's sole air unit in Japan. It was now the largest squadron in the RAAF, comprising 299 officers and men, forty Mustangs, three CAC Wirraways, two Douglas C-47 Dakotas and two Austers. The squadron was preparing to return to Australia when it was placed on standby for action over Korea; it began flying missions as part of the United Nations (UN) peacekeeping force a week later. No. 77 Squadron's commanding officer, Wing Commander Lou Spence, was killed in action on 9 September 1950, and Air Commodore Alan Charlesworth, Chief of Staff at BCOF, temporarily took charge at Iwakuni, pending the formation of an overarching organisation for support and administration at the base. Squadron Leader Dick Cresswell arrived on 17 September to assume command of No. 77 Squadron.

Following the landing at Inchon and the northward advance of UN troops, No. 77 Squadron relocated to Pohang, South Korea, on 12 October 1950. It left its main support elements at Iwakuni. No. 91 (Composite) Wing was established at the base on 20 October. The term "composite" referred to an RAAF formation made up of disparate operational elements, rather than one comprising a single type such as bombers or fighters. Commanded by Group Captain A.D. (Dallas) Charlton, No. 91 Wing was given administrative responsibility for all RAAF units operating during the Korean War. As well as No. 77 Squadron, this included the newly formed No. 391 (Base) Squadron and No. 491 (Maintenance) Squadron, and No. 30 Communications Flight, formerly the No. 77 Squadron Communications Flight and initially comprising its two Dakotas and two Austers. Apart from No. 77 Squadron, the wing's units were all headquartered at Iwakuni. Some members of the US Far East Air Forces command favoured the establishment of a British Commonwealth Wing, to include No. 77 Squadron and the Mustang-equipped No. 2 Squadron of the South African Air Force, then en route to Korea, but the South African government vetoed the idea.

=== Operations ===
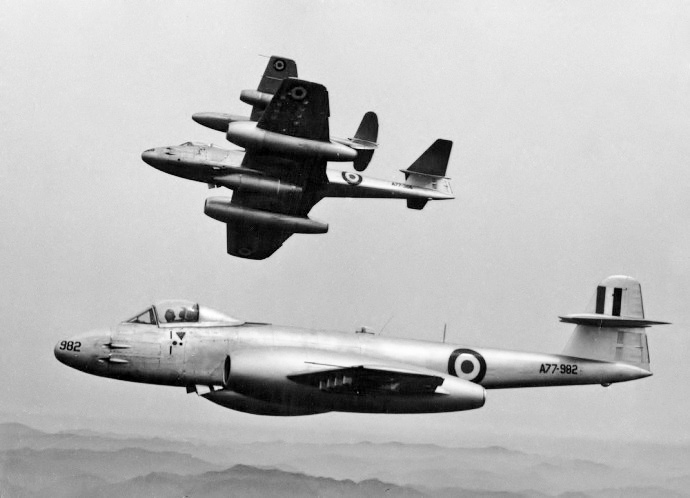
No. 77 Squadron Meteors practise manoeuvres during a training exercise over Iwakuni, Japan, 1952.

No. 77 Squadron's tasking was controlled by the United States Fifth Air Force from the time it commenced operations in Korea, and this arrangement was not affected by the formation of No. 91 Wing. It moved forward from Pohang to Yonpo, near Hamhung, in November 1950, continuing its support of UN forces as they advanced up the peninsula. North Korea's counter-attack, augmented by Chinese forces, led to the squadron being hurriedly withdrawn to Pusan on 3 December. Poor radio communications with No. 91 Wing dogged the evacuation from Yonpo, which was effected through US Air Force support supplementing the efforts of RAAF Dakotas. Cresswell believed that the Iwakuni-based wing headquarters was not always in tune with frontline requirements, and he often dealt directly with Lieutenant General Sir Horace Robertson, BCOF commander and the theatre's senior Australian officer, and the RAAF's Deputy Chief of the Air Staff, Air Vice Marshal Frederick Scherger.

In response to the threat of communist Mikoyan-Gurevich MiG-15 jet fighters, No. 77 Squadron was withdrawn to Iwakuni in April 1951, to re-equip with Gloster Meteors. Four Royal Air Force officers with Meteor experience were seconded to No. 91 Wing to assist with training. The squadron returned to action with its new aircraft on 29 July, operating out of Kimpo, South Korea. The Mustangs had been highly effective in close support, but No. 77 Squadron's main role in the RAAF was interception, and it was expected that with the Meteor it could again focus on fighter duties. According to the official history of Australia in the Korean War, the unit proved its value diplomatically as well as operationally: having been one of the first UN squadrons to go into action, it comprised one-third of the jet fighter force in the latter part of 1951, when clashes in "MiG Alley" were at their height. However, dogfights between Meteors and MiGs that August convinced the new commanding officer, Wing Commander Gordon Steege, that the Australian jets were outmatched, and Fifth Air Force agreed to take them out of an offensive air-to-air combat role in favour of escort duties and local air defence. The squadron's loss rate by the end of the year was one in four killed or captured.

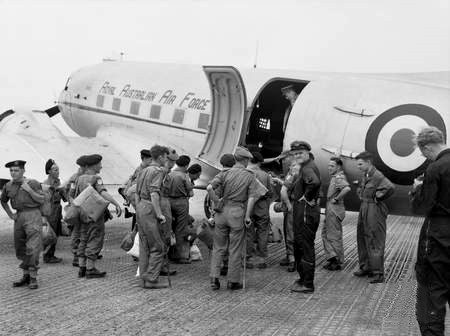
Former prisoners of war board a Dakota transport of No. 36 Squadron in Seoul, South Korea, August 1953.

Beginning in December 1951 under Steege's replacement, Wing Commander Ron Susans, No. 77 Squadron again took up an offensive role, namely ground attack, which constituted its primary tasking for the rest of the war. Flight Lieutenant J.C. Smith, No. 91 Wing's armament officer, played a key role in developing "Flaming Onion", napalm-tipped air-to-ground rockets that were used in several operations in 1952 and 1953. No. 77 Squadron remained in Korea on garrison duty—initially at Kimpo, later at Kunsan—following the armistice in July 1953. It had lost forty-one pilots killed during the war. A further seven pilots became prisoners of war. Aircraft losses totalled almost sixty, including over forty Meteors, mostly to ground fire. The squadron flew 18,872 sorties, including 3,872 in Mustangs and 15,000 in Meteors. It was credited with shooting down five MiG-15s and destroying 3,700 buildings, 1,408 vehicles, ninety-eight locomotives and carriages, and sixteen bridges.

No. 30 Communications Flight included Robertson's personal Dakota, operating under his direction. The unit's complement of two Dakotas and two Austers was soon augmented by two more Dakotas from Australia. On 1 November 1950, No. 30 Communications Flight was renamed No. 30 Communications Unit. The same month, it received another four Dakotas from No. 38 Squadron, of No. 90 (Composite) Wing in Malaya, giving it a strength of eight Dakotas and two Austers. The unit supported all Australian forces in Korea. One of its key functions was medical evacuation, but it was also responsible for supply drops, search and rescue, reconnaissance, and mail delivery, as well as transporting cargo, troops, and VIPs. Unlike No. 77 Squadron, it was not tasked by Fifth Air Force but instead operated under Australian control, which was exercised through BCOF headquarters in Japan. No. 30 Communications Unit was re-formed as No. 30 Transport Unit on 5 November 1951, and as No. 36 (Transport) Squadron on 10 March 1953. During the war it transported around 100,000 passengers and over 6,000 tons of cargo. No. 91 Wing's records listed 12,762 medical evacuations from Korea to Japan, and over 2,000 from Japan to Australia or Britain. The transportation unit lost an Auster and a Wirraway to crashes, resulting in four deaths.

=== Support ===
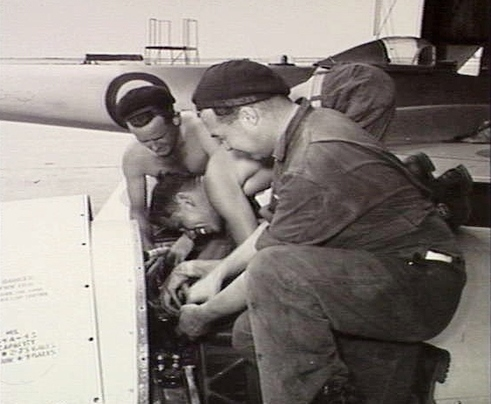
No. 491 Squadron maintenance staff working on a Meteor engine at Iwakuni, June 1954.

When the Korean War broke out, No. 77 Squadron was self-supporting. The added burden of combat operations made this situation untenable after the squadron went into action in Korea, leading to the formation of No. 391 (Base) Squadron at Iwakuni, at the same time as No. 91 Wing headquarters. RAAF base squadrons were responsible for administrative, logistical, medical, communications and security functions. Staffed mainly by former No. 77 Squadron members, in the first year of its existence No. 391 Squadron had to contend with severe shortages of winter clothing and equipment. Further problems arose following the introduction of the Meteor, as spares for the British-made jet were harder to obtain than for the American Mustang. Along with its RAAF responsibilities, No. 391 Squadron supported Australian Army and other UN personnel travelling through Iwakuni. It ran No. 91 Wing's "Transit Hotel", which accommodated business people and entertainers, as well as military personnel. The squadron's medical contingent was heavily engaged in the preparation and escort of injured personnel from Korea to Iwakuni and then to other destinations.

No. 491 Squadron was also formed in tandem with No. 91 Wing on 20 October 1950. Headquartered at Iwakuni, it was responsible for all maintenance of the wing's aircraft except day-to-day servicing. A section was attached to No. 77 Squadron in South Korea to assist ground staff with daily maintenance. Personnel from Iwakuni were regularly rotated through this section, and augmented by additional No. 491 Squadron staff as needed for repair or salvage work. The standard RAAF working days for technicians at Iwakuni contrasted with shifts of up to sixteen hours near the front line in Korea. Korea was one of the coldest climates in which RAAF ground crews had ever worked; Squadron Leader Cresswell recalled seeing maintenance staff with tools frozen to their hands. Both Nos. 391 and 491 Squadrons used Japanese technicians as well as Australian, which was unusual for the time; during the occupation of Japan following its surrender in World War II, the RAAF had only employed Japanese workers for menial tasks.

=== Disbandment ===
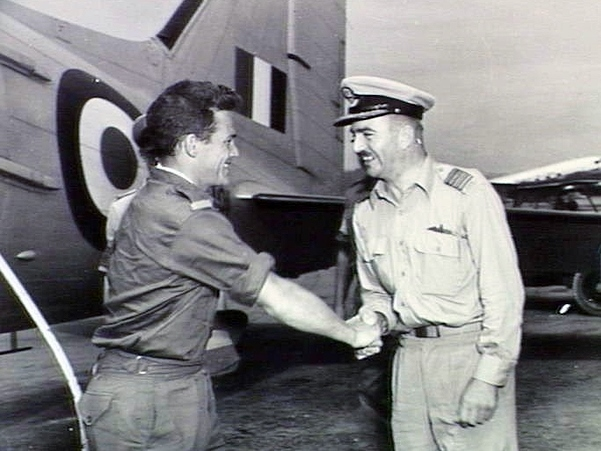
Group Captain Dixie Chapman, commanding No. 91 Wing, greets a No. 77 Squadron pilot who had been shot down over North Korea and imprisoned, September 1953.

No. 77 Squadron stood down at Kunsan on 7 October 1954 and flew its Meteors to Iwakuni five days later. It departed for Australia in November and became operational again at RAAF Base Williamtown, New South Wales, on 4 January 1955. Its eleven-year absence from Australia, beginning in the Pacific during World War II and continuing in Japan as part of BCOF, was a record for an RAAF unit. No. 491 Squadron disbanded at Iwakuni on 13 December 1954. No. 36 Squadron ceased flying on 13 March 1955 and returned to Australia, leaving behind three Dakotas and a Wirraway that equipped RAAF Transport Flight (Japan), formed the following day under No. 91 Wing. No. 391 Squadron and No. 91 Wing headquarters were disbanded at Iwakuni on 30 April 1955. Transport Flight (Japan) flew a courier service to South Korea and remained operational until 8 July 1956, when its last Dakota—the last RAAF aircraft in Japan—departed Iwakuni.

== Commanding officers ==
No. 91 Wing was commanded by the following officers:

Appointed	Name
October 1950	Group Captain Arthur Dallas Charlton
September 1951	Group Captain Anthony George Carr
November 1952	Group Captain Dixie Robison Chapman
February 1954	Wing Commander Wilfred Norman Lampe
April 1954	Group Captain Ivan Stanley Podger
