= No. 30 Transport Unit RAAF =

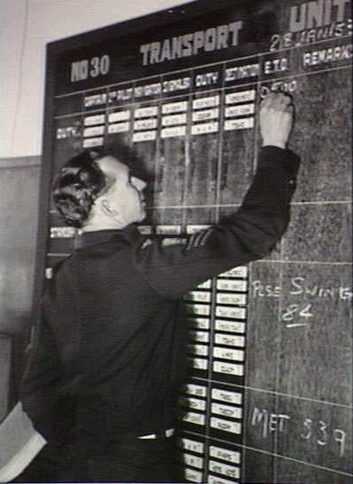
- Recording the next day's tasking for No. 30 Transport Unit at Iwakuni, Japan, in 1953
- Active: 1950–1951 (No. 30 Communications Unit); 1951–1953 (No. 30 Transport Unit)
- Country: Australia
- Branch: Royal Australian Air Force
- Role: Transport
- Part of: No. 91 Wing
- Headquarters: Iwakuni, Japan
- Engagements: Korean War

Aircraft flown
- Transport: C-47 Dakota; Auster; CAC Wirraway

No. 30 Transport Unit was a Royal Australian Air Force (RAAF) unit that operated during the Korean War. It was formed in November 1950 as No. 30 Communications Unit and based at Iwakuni, Japan, as part of No. 91 (Composite) Wing. The unit was initially equipped with four Douglas C–47 Dakotas and two Austers, one of the Dakotas being the personal transport of Lieutenant General Sir Horace Robertson, commander of the British Commonwealth Occupation Force (BCOF). Another four Dakotas were sent to Japan due to operational demands. The unit's role in Korea was to support No. 77 (Fighter) Squadron by transporting supplies and equipment. It also delivered materials and stores to Australian and Commonwealth ground forces, and transported VIPs of the United Nations Command. Return journeys to Japan were often used to evacuate wounded personnel from the theatre. No. 30 Communications Unit was redesignated No. 30 Transport Unit in November 1951, and re-formed as No. 36 (Transport) Squadron in March 1953. The squadron remained in Korea following the armistice, and returned to Australia in June 1955.

== History ==
When the Korean War broke out on 25 June 1950, No. 77 (Fighter) Squadron of the Royal Australian Air Force (RAAF) was based at Iwakuni, Japan, having served with the British Commonwealth Occupation Force (BCOF) for four years. Equipped primarily with North American P-51 Mustangs, the squadron also operated a communications flight of two Douglas C-47 Dakotas and two Austers. Personnel were preparing to return to Australia when they were placed on standby for action over Korea; the Mustangs began flying missions as part of United Nations Command (UNC) forces a week later. Following the landing at Inchon and the consequent advance northward of UNC troops, No. 77 Squadron relocated to Pohang, South Korea, on 12 October 1950. It left behind its main support elements at Iwakuni. No. 91 (Composite) Wing was established at the base on 20 October and given administrative responsibility for all RAAF units operating during the conflict. As well as No. 77 Squadron, this included the newly formed No. 391 (Base) Squadron and No. 491 (Maintenance) Squadron, and No. 30 Communications Flight, formerly the No. 77 Squadron Communications Flight. The flight's original complement of two Dakotas and two Austers had been augmented in September 1950 by two more Dakotas from Australia. On 1 November, the flight was designated No. 30 Communications Unit.

No. 30 Communications Unit was headquartered at Iwakuni, along with the rest of No. 91 Wing's components except No. 77 Squadron, which was based on the Korean peninsula. It was initially commanded, unofficially, by Flight Lieutenant (later Air Commodore) Dave Hitchens. According to Hitchens, "Having commanded the communications flight in No. 77 Squadron, I assumed control but had no formal authority to do so, but nobody told me to stop." The transport aircraft included the personal Dakota of the BCOF commander, Lieutenant General Sir Horace Robertson, operating under his direction. During November 1950, the unit received another four Dakotas from No. 38 Squadron (of No. 90 (Composite) Wing in Malaya), giving it a total strength of eight Dakotas and two Austers. It supported all Australian forces in Korea. One of its key functions was medical evacuation, but it was also responsible for supply drops, search and rescue, reconnaissance, and mail delivery, as well as transporting cargo, troops, and VIPs. Unlike No. 77 Squadron, it was not tasked by the US Fifth Air Force but instead operated under Australian control, exercised through BCOF headquarters in Japan. In December 1950 the unit undertook "Operation Haggis", the delivery of 180 pounds (82 kg) of haggis to the Argyll and Sutherland Highlanders based in Suwon, Korea. The same month, a United States Air Force Mustang taking off from Suwon smashed into the cockpit of one of the Dakotas; none of the Australian crew was injured but the aircraft had to be written off and stripped for components by No. 491 Squadron.

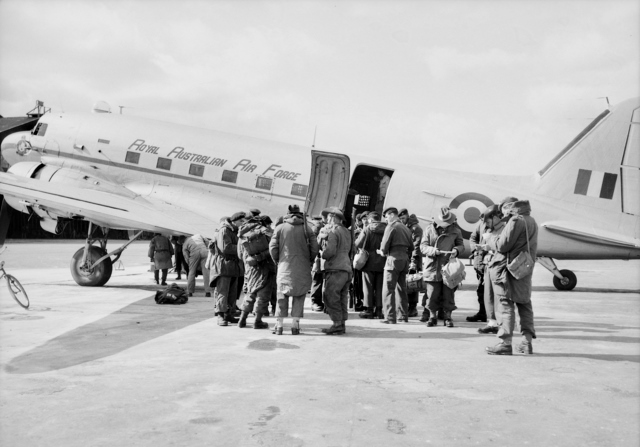
Commonwealth troops wait to board a Dakota of No. 30 Transport Unit at Iwakuni, Japan, in 1952

The first official commanding officer of No. 30 Communications Unit, Squadron Leader John Gerber, took over from Hitchens on 28 January 1951. As of 31 March, the unit's strength was eight Dakotas and two Austers, and fifty-seven personnel including twelve officers. According to the RAAF Historical Section, a "typical month" (May 1951) involved carrying over 1,000 troops, 180,000 pounds (82,000 kg) of cargo and 95,000 pounds (43,000 kg) of mail from Iwakuni to Korea, and over 1,000 troops, 380 medical evacuees, 16,000 pounds (7,300 kg) of cargo and 32,000 pounds (15,000 kg) of mail from Korea to Iwakuni. No. 30 Communications Unit was redesignated No. 30 Transport Unit on 5 November 1951. One of its aircraft dropped a wreath over Hiroshima on 6 August 1952, the seventh anniversary of the atomic bombing. As of 31 December 1952, its strength was eight Dakotas and one CAC Wirraway, and fifty-nine personnel including eight officers.

On 10 March 1953, No. 30 Transport Unit re-formed as No. 36 (Transport) Squadron, which had disbanded the previous day at RAAF Base Richmond, New South Wales. Between the armistice in July and the end of August 1953, the squadron repatriated over 900 Commonwealth prisoners of war. As of 30 November 1954, its strength was seven Dakotas and one Wirraway, and eighty-seven personnel including seven officers. Elements of No. 36 Squadron began returning to Australia in January 1955, and by the end of the month its strength was four Dakotas and one Wirraway, and fifty-eight personnel including five officers. Nominal operational control of the squadron was transferred to Fifth Air Force on 1 February 1955, though its purpose continued to be the support of Commonwealth forces. No. 36 Squadron ceased flying on 13 March, after which its remaining elements departed Iwakuni for Australia, leaving three Dakotas and a Wirraway that formed RAAF Transport Flight (Japan); the flight operated until July 1956 and was disbanded two months later.

The transportation unit suffered two fatal accidents. One of the Austers crashed on takeoff in April 1951, killing all three occupants. A Wirraway came down in a river after striking telephone wires in June 1952; the pilot and passenger survived the impact but the latter subsequently died of his injuries. During the war the Dakotas carried around 100,000 passengers and over 6,000 long tons (6,100,000 kg) of cargo. No. 91 Wing's records listed 12,762 medical evacuations from Korea to Japan. Reflecting on the nature of transport work in Korea, Hitchens stated:

Most of our flying was not very exciting; but there was a lot of it. Lots of late dark nights. Lots of crowded airfields. Lots of plain hard work. [...] We all shed a lot of weight.
