= No. 491 Squadron RAAF =

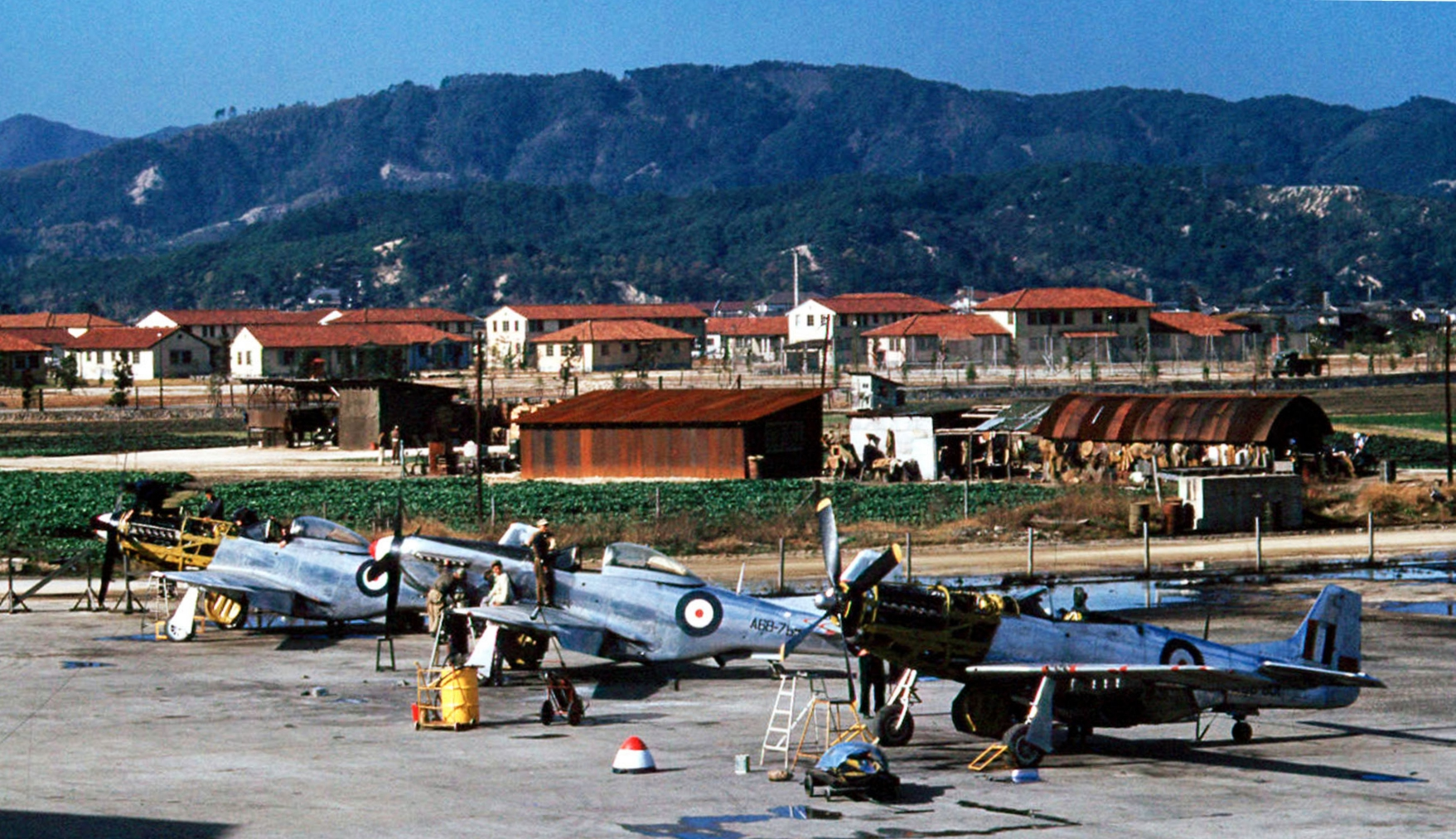
- Mustang fighters of No. 77 Squadron RAAF undergoing maintenance at Iwakuni, Japan, c. 1950–51
- Active: 1950–1954
- Country: Australia
- Branch: Royal Australian Air Force
- Type: Maintenance squadron
- Part of: No. 91 Wing
- Headquarters: Iwakuni, Japan
- Engagements: Korean War

No. 491 (Maintenance) Squadron was a Royal Australian Air Force (RAAF) squadron that operated during the Korean War and its immediate aftermath. It was unusual in that it was never based in Australia, being formed and dissolved in Japan. The squadron was established in October 1950 as part of No. 91 (Composite) Wing, which administered all RAAF units deployed as part of Australia's involvement in the Korean War. Apart from No. 491 Squadron, these included No. 77 (Fighter) Squadron, No. 30 Communications Unit (redesignated No. 30 Transport Unit in 1951 and No. 36 (Transport) Squadron in 1953), and No. 391 (Base) Squadron. No. 77 Squadron was based on the Korean peninsula, while No. 491 Squadron and No. 91 Wing's other components were headquartered at Iwakuni, Japan. The maintenance squadron was responsible for the upkeep of all No. 91 Wing aircraft at Iwakuni, and a section was attached to No. 77 Squadron in South Korea to assist with day-to-day servicing. No. 491 Squadron was disbanded in December 1954.

== History ==
When the Korean War broke out on 25 June 1950, No. 77 (Fighter) Squadron of the Royal Australian Air Force (RAAF) was based at Iwakuni, Japan. For the previous four years the squadron, equipped with North American P-51 Mustangs, had served with the British Commonwealth Occupation Force (BCOF). Personnel were preparing to return to Australia when they were placed on standby for action over Korea; the squadron began flying missions as part of United Nations (UN) forces a week later. Following the landing at Inchon and the consequent advance northward of UN troops, No. 77 Squadron relocated to Pohang, South Korea, on 12 October 1950. It left behind its main support elements at Iwakuni. No. 91 (Composite) Wing was established at the base on 20 October and given administrative responsibility for all RAAF units operating during the conflict. This included No. 77 Squadron and three newly formed components: No. 30 Communications Flight (renamed No. 30 Communications Unit the following month, No. 30 Transport Unit in November 1951 and No. 36 (Transport) Squadron in March 1953), No. 391 (Base) Squadron and No. 491 (Maintenance) Squadron. Apart from No. 77 Squadron, the wing's units were all headquartered at Iwakuni.

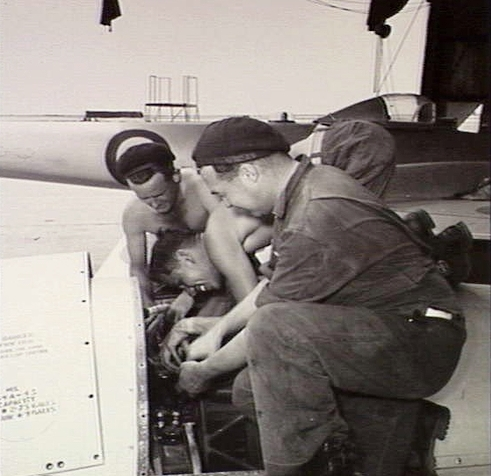
No. 491 Squadron mechanics working on a Meteor engine at Iwakuni, June 1954

No. 491 Squadron was formed in tandem with No. 91 Wing on 20 October 1950. Headquartered at Iwakuni, it was responsible for all maintenance of the wing's aircraft except day-to-day servicing. A section was attached to No. 77 Squadron in Korea to assist ground staff with daily maintenance. Personnel from Iwakuni were regularly rotated through this section, and augmented by additional No. 491 Squadron staff as needed for repair or salvage work. On one occasion, members of No. 491 Squadron had to strip components from a Douglas C-47 Dakota of No. 30 Communications Unit that had been destroyed when a UN Mustang smashed into its cockpit while landing at Suwon, Korea; according to one of the Australian ground crew, "There was a fair amount of urgency attached to the job as we could see Mustangs doing strafing runs not too far away." Normal practice was to fly aircraft to Iwakuni for major repairs or scrapping. The regular hours worked by technicians at Iwakuni contrasted with shifts of up to sixteen hours near the front line in Korea. Korea was one of the coldest climates in which RAAF ground crews had ever worked; the commanding officer of No. 77 Squadron from September 1950 to August 1951, Squadron Leader Dick Cresswell, recalled seeing maintenance staff with tools frozen to their hands.

In December 1950, a dozen RAAF personnel were posted to Britain for training in the maintenance of Gloster Meteor jet fighters, which were shortly to replace No. 77 Squadron's Mustangs; the newly trained staff arrived in Japan two months later. As the war progressed, No. 491 Squadron had to concentrate more and more of its efforts on No. 77 Squadron's Meteors, requiring it to hand over some of its assigned Dakota maintenance tasks to ground crew at No. 30 Transport Unit. The official historian of Australia in the Korean War described the RAAF's technical support as "outstanding", resulting in an almost perfect serviceability record for No. 77 Squadron's fighters. The squadron was equipped with twenty-two Meteors, sixteen of which were ready for combat at any one time, giving it a strength considerably greater than its counterparts in the United States Air Force. As well as servicing No. 91 Wing's aircraft, Nos. 491 Squadron was responsible for testing and packing parachutes, "Mae Wests", dinghies and other safety equipment for aircrew. Its staff numbered around 120. Like No. 391 Squadron, it employed Japanese technicians as well as Australian, which was unusual for the time; during the occupation of Japan following its surrender in World War II, the RAAF had only employed Japanese workers for menial tasks.

No. 77 Squadron departed for Australia in November 1954, and No. 491 Squadron's disbandment at Iwakuni followed on 13 December 1954.
