= No. 391 Squadron RAAF =

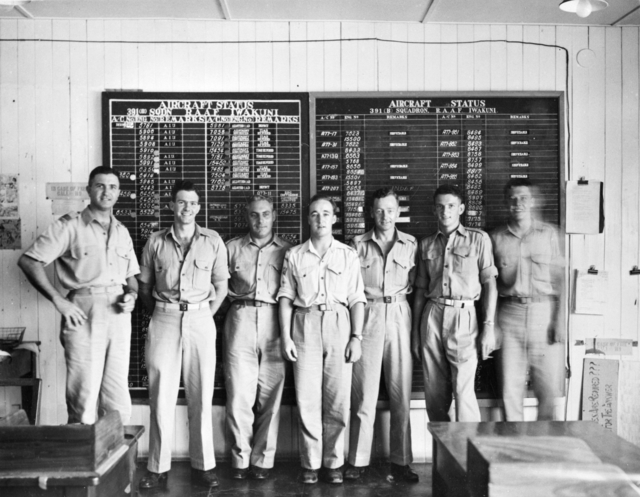
- Members of No. 391 Squadron in front of an air movements status board at Iwakuni, Japan, August 1953
- Active: 1950–1955
- Country: Australia
- Branch: Royal Australian Air Force
- Type: Base squadron
- Part of: No. 91 Wing
- Headquarters: Iwakuni, Japan
- Engagements: Korean War

No. 391 (Base) Squadron was a Royal Australian Air Force (RAAF) squadron that operated during the Korean War and its immediate aftermath. It was established in October 1950 as part of No. 91 (Composite) Wing, which administered RAAF units deployed in the conflict. Apart from No. 391 Squadron, these included No. 77 (Fighter) Squadron, No. 30 Communications Unit (redesignated No. 30 Transport Unit in 1951 and No. 36 (Transport) Squadron in 1953), and No. 491 (Maintenance) Squadron. No. 391 Squadron was headquartered at Iwakuni, Japan, as were No. 91 Wing's other components with the exception of No. 77 Squadron, which was located on the Korean peninsula. The base squadron was responsible for administrative, logistical, medical, communications and security functions at Iwakuni, and also maintained detachments in South Korea. It included a marine section for harbour patrols and search-and-rescue in the waters off southern Japan. No. 391 Squadron was disbanded at the same time as No. 91 Wing headquarters, in April 1955.

== History ==
When the Korean War broke out on 25 June 1950, No. 77 (Fighter) Squadron of the Royal Australian Air Force (RAAF) was based at Iwakuni, Japan. For the previous four years the squadron, equipped with North American P-51 Mustangs, had served with the British Commonwealth Occupation Force (BCOF). Personnel were preparing to return to Australia when they were placed on standby for action over Korea; the squadron began flying missions as part of United Nations (UN) forces a week later. Following the landing at Inchon and the consequent advance northward of UN troops, No. 77 Squadron relocated to Pohang, South Korea, on 12 October 1950. It left behind its main support elements at Iwakuni. No. 91 (Composite) Wing was established at the base on 20 October and given administrative responsibility for all RAAF units operating during the conflict. This included No. 77 Squadron and three newly formed components: No. 30 Communications Flight (renamed No. 30 Communications Unit the following month, No. 30 Transport Unit in November 1951 and No. 36 (Transport) Squadron in March 1953), No. 491 (Maintenance) Squadron, and No. 391 (Base) Squadron. Apart from No. 77 Squadron, the wing's units were all headquartered at Iwakuni.

At the onset of war in Korea, No. 77 Squadron was self-supporting, the largest flying unit in the RAAF. It comprised 299 officers and men, 40 Mustangs, 3 CAC Wirraways, 2 Douglas C-47 Dakotas and 2 Austers. The added burden of combat operations made this situation untenable after the squadron went into action in Korea, leading to the formation of No. 391 (Base) Squadron at Iwakuni, at the same time as No. 91 Wing headquarters. RAAF base squadrons were responsible for administrative, logistical, medical, communications and security functions. Staffed mainly by former No. 77 Squadron members, in the first year of its existence No. 391 Squadron had to try to overcome severe shortages of winter clothing and equipment. Further problems arose when No. 77 Squadron converted to Gloster Meteors between April and July 1951, as spares for the British-made jet were harder to obtain than for the American Mustang. No longer could No. 391 Squadron source parts from the US Fifth Air Force as it had up till this point. Disposal of the Mustangs and their spares also caused headaches; the process took two years, causing storage issues. The base squadron faced another challenge in January 1952, following a controversial change in role for the Meteors, from air-to-air combat to ground attack, which necessitated obtaining supplies of rockets and modification of the aircraft to carry them.

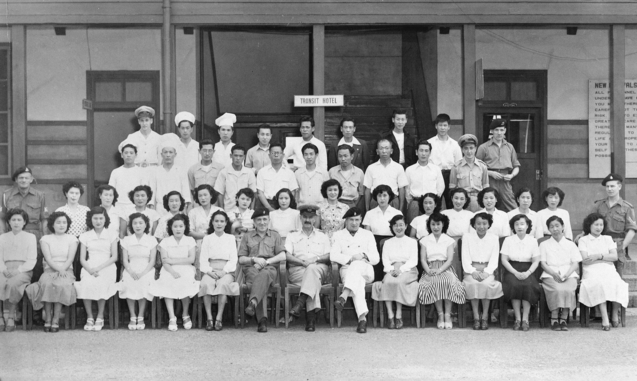
Staff of No. 91 Wing's "Transit Hotel" at Iwakuni, run by No. 391 Squadron, c. April 1953

Along with its RAAF responsibilities, No. 391 Squadron supported Australian Army and other UN personnel travelling through Iwakuni. It ran No. 91 Wing's "Transit Hotel", which accommodated business people and entertainers, as well as military personnel. The squadron maintained two detachments in South Korea, one at Kimpo Air Base to handle Meteor spares, and another at the RAAF ward of the British Commonwealth Zone Medical Unit in Seoul. Base support staff regularly rotated from Iwakuni to these detachments. No. 391 Squadron's medical contingent was heavily engaged in the preparation and escort of injured personnel from Korea to Iwakuni and then to other destinations. The unit included a marine craft section equipped with small boats that patrolled harbours in southern Japan used by British and American flying boats, and conducted search-and-rescue operations for UN pilots who ditched at sea. No. 391 Squadron used Japanese technicians as well as Australian, which was unusual at the time; since the occupation of Japan following its surrender in World War II, Japanese workers had only been employed for menial tasks.

Following the departure for Australia of Nos. 77 and 36 Squadrons between November 1954 and March 1955, and the disbandment of No. 491 Squadron in December 1954, No. 391 Squadron disbanded on 30 April 1955, the same day as No. 91 Wing headquarters.
