= HMAS Tobruk (D37) =

Battle-class destroyer

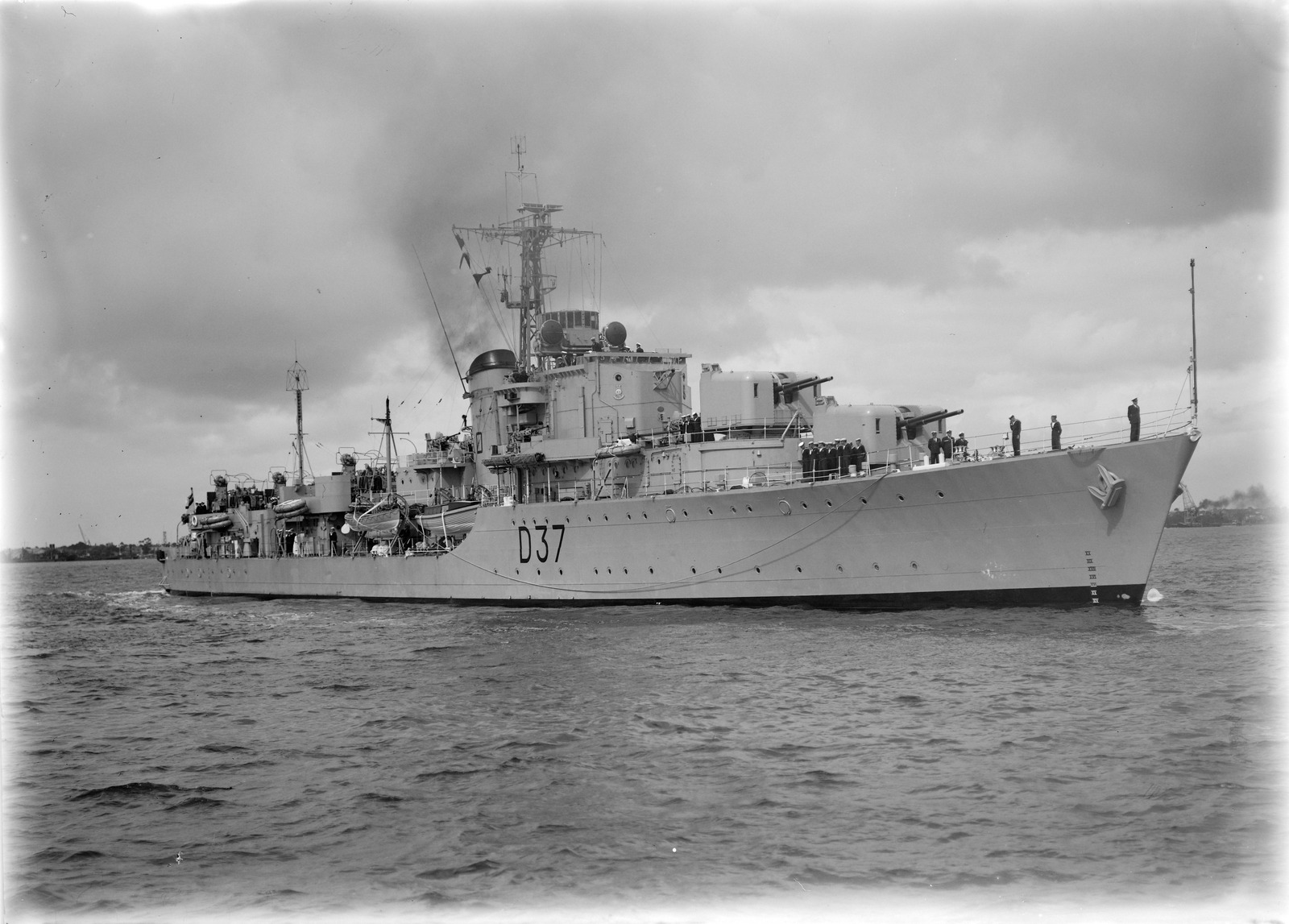
- HMAS Tobruk in 1952

History

Australia
- Namesake: Siege of Tobruk
- Builder: Cockatoo Docks and Engineering Company
- Laid down: 5 August 1946
- Launched: 20 December 1947
- Commissioned: 8 May 1950
- Decommissioned: 9 October 1960
- Motto: Fidelis et Fortis; "Faithful and Strong"
- Honours and awards: Battle honours: Korea 1951–53; Malaya 1956
- Fate: Sold for scrap in 1972

General characteristics
- Class & type: Battle-class destroyer
- Displacement: 2,436 tons (standard), 3,400 tons (full load)
- Length: 379 ft (116 m) length overall; 355 ft (108 m) between perpendiculars
- Beam: 41 ft (12 m)
- Draught: 13 ft 6 in (4.11 m)
- Propulsion: Admiralty 3-drum boilers, Parsons geared turbines, 50,000 shp (37,000 kW), two shafts
- Speed: 31.5 knots (58.3 km/h; 36.2 mph) as designed; 32.36 knots (59.93 km/h; 37.24 mph) during trails
- Range: 1,140 nautical miles (2,110 km; 1,310 mi) at 31 knots (57 km/h; 36 mph); 4,420 nautical miles (8,190 km; 5,090 mi) at 12 knots (22 km/h; 14 mph)
- Complement: 19 officers, 301 sailors
- Armament: 4 × QF 4.5-inch (113 mm)/45 Mark V guns in 2 twin mountings UD Mark VI; 12 × 40 mm Bofors anti-aircraft guns (3 twin, 6 single); 2 × 21 in (533 mm) 5-tube Pentad torpedo tube sets; Squid anti-submarine mortar

HMAS Tobruk (D37) was a Battle-class destroyer of the Royal Australian Navy (RAN). Built at the Cockatoo Island Dockyard, the destroyer was completed in 1950. Tobruk was deployed to the Korean War twice, and served with the Far East Strategic Reserve on three occasions during the late 1950s. In 1960, she was damaged beyond economical repair by sister ship HMAS Anzac during a gunnery exercise, which led to the destroyer's decommissioning that year, and sale for scrap in 1971.

== Design and construction ==
Tobruk was a Battle-class destroyer. The ship had a standard load displacement of 2,436 tons and a full load displacement of 3,400 tons. She was 379 feet (116 m) long overall and 355 feet (108 m) long between perpendiculars, had a beam of 41 feet (12 m), and a draught of 13 feet 6 inches (4.11 m). Propulsion machinery consisted of Admiralty 3-drum boilers connected to Parsons geared turbines, which supplied 50,000 shaft horsepower (37,000 kW) to the ship's two propeller shafts. Although designed with a maximum speed of 31.5 knots (58.3 km/h; 36.2 mph), Tobruk achieved 32.36 knots (59.93 km/h; 37.24 mph) during full-power trials. Maximum range was 1,140 nautical miles (2,110 km; 1,310 mi) at 31 knots (57 km/h; 36 mph), or 4,420 nautical miles (8,190 km; 5,090 mi) at 12 knots (22 km/h; 14 mph). The ship's company consisted of 19 officers and 301 sailors.

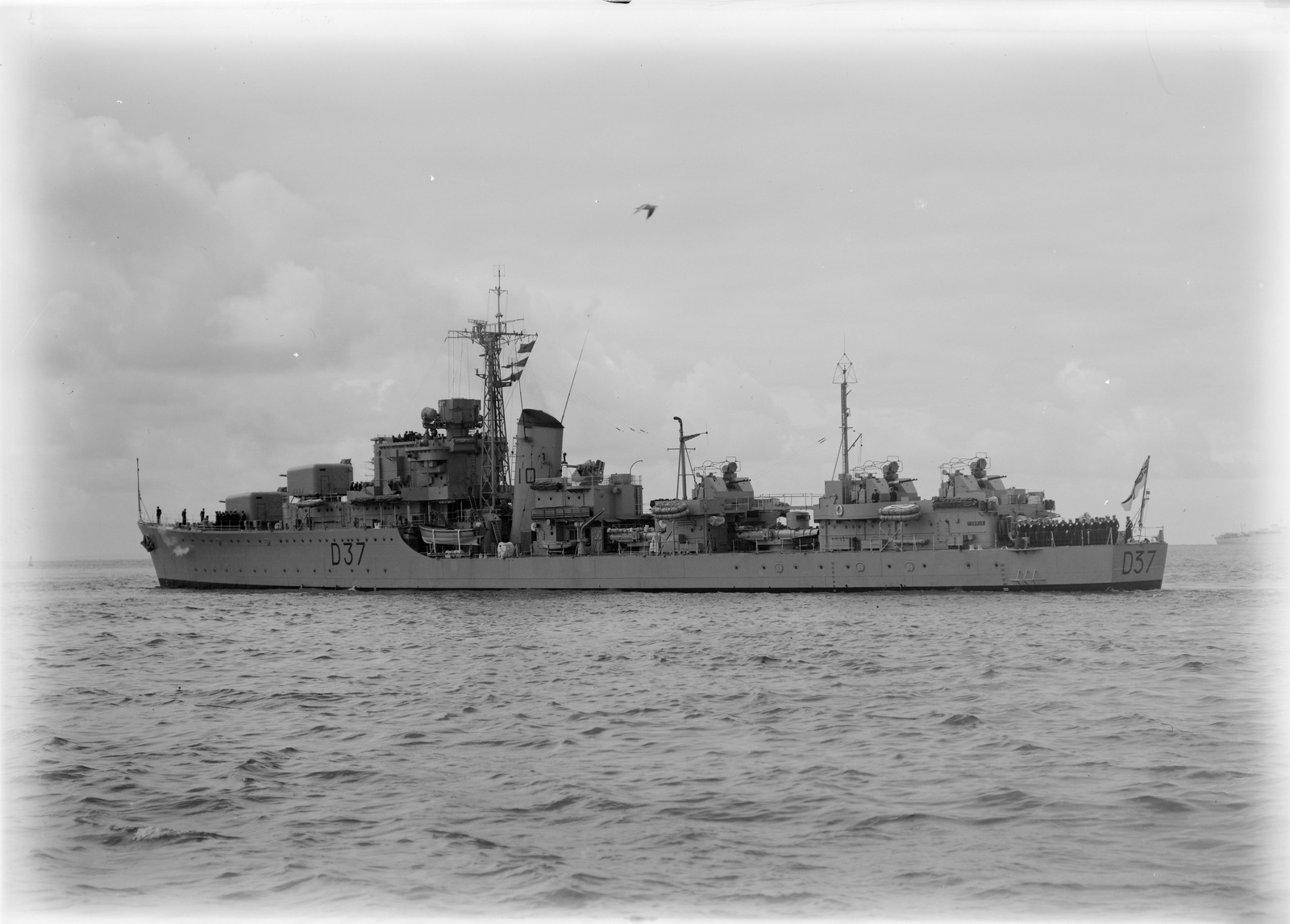
Tobruk

Tobruk's primary armament consisted of four 4.5-inch (114 mm) Mark III guns, fitted forward in two twin turrets. For anti-aircraft defence, the ship carried twelve 40 mm Bofors anti-aircraft guns: three twin mountings on the aft half of the ship, and six single mountings. Two five-tube Pentad torpedo tube sets were carried. Tobruk was also fitted with a Squid anti-submarine mortar.

The ship was laid down by the Cockatoo Docks and Engineering Company at their shipyard on Cockatoo Island, New South Wales on 5 August 1946. Tobruk was launched on 20 December 1947 by the wife of Bill Riordan, Minister for the Navy. The destroyer was commissioned into the RAN on 8 May 1950, although she was not completed until 17 May. The ship's name comes from the Siege of Tobruk.

== Operational history ==
After completing trials and workups, Tobruk was deployed to the Korean War in August 1951. Between October 1951 and January 1952, the destroyer carried out six patrols, primarily serving as an aircraft carrier escort, or performing shore bombardments. Tobruk returned to Australia in February 1952. In October, she was part of the security patrol around the Montebello Islands during Operation Hurricane, the first British nuclear weapons test. In June 1953, Tobruk returned to Korea for a second deployment. Although a ceasefire was signed in July 1953, Tobruk remained in the area until January 1954, then returned to Australia for a refit. Tobruk received the battle honour "Korea 1951–53" for these deployments.

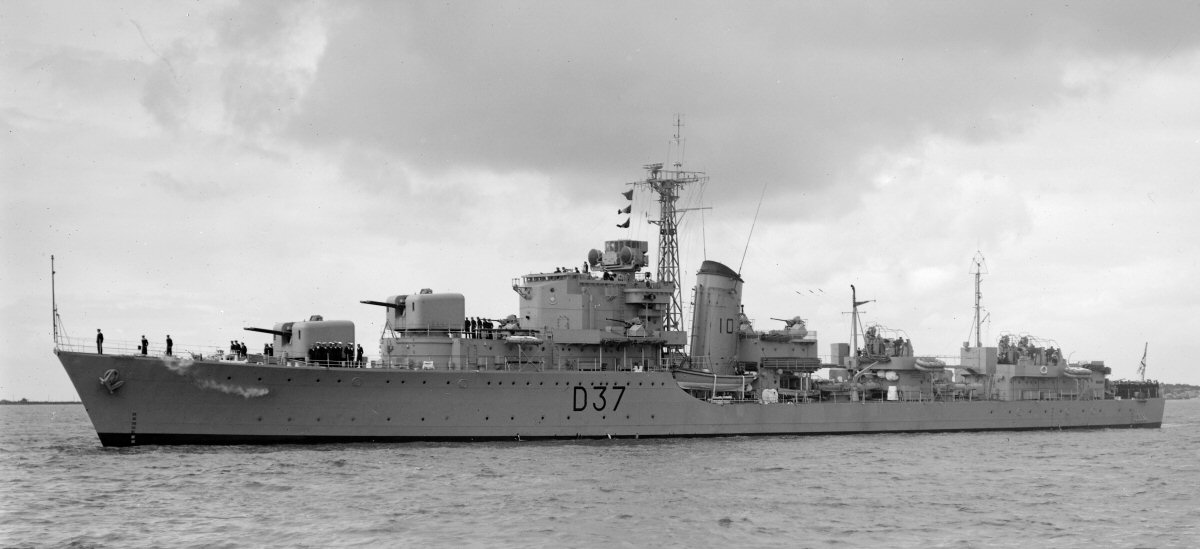
HMAS Tobruk

After completing refit, Tobruk operated in the waters of Australia and New Guinea until mid 1955, when she joined several RAN ships in a deployment to South East Asia. In 1956, she was assigned to the Far East Strategic Reserve. A further deployment was made in 1957, during which Tobruk was involved in the Malayan Emergency; this was later recognised with a second battle honour: "Malaya 1957". On 26 April, during night exercises, a star shell fired by HMS Cockade landed in one of Tobruk's gun bays, killing one sailor and severely wounding another. The destroyer's third and final assignment to the Strategic Reserve occurred during 1959. After a refit during early 1960, Tobruk and several other RAN ships made port visits to Nouméa and New Guinea.

== Fate ==
In September 1960, Tobruk was performing gunnery exercises with sister ship HMAS Anzac off Jervis Bay. A malfunction in Anzac's gun direction equipment negated the deliberate 6° mis-aiming of her guns, with the resulting shell hitting Tobruk and doing enough damage to the destroyer to require lengthy repairs. Temporary repairs were made to Tobruk in Jervis Bay before the ship limped back to Sydney, where she was placed into reserve on 29 October 1960. Two of Anzac's crew were charged over the incident.

Repairing the destroyer was considered uneconomical, and she remained moored until the ship was marked for disposal on 14 May 1971. Tobruk was sold for scrap to Fujita Salvage Company Limited of Osaka, Japan on 15 February 1972, and departed Sydney under tow on 10 April 1972.
