= HMAS Anzac (D59) =

Battle-class destroyer of the Royal Australian Navy

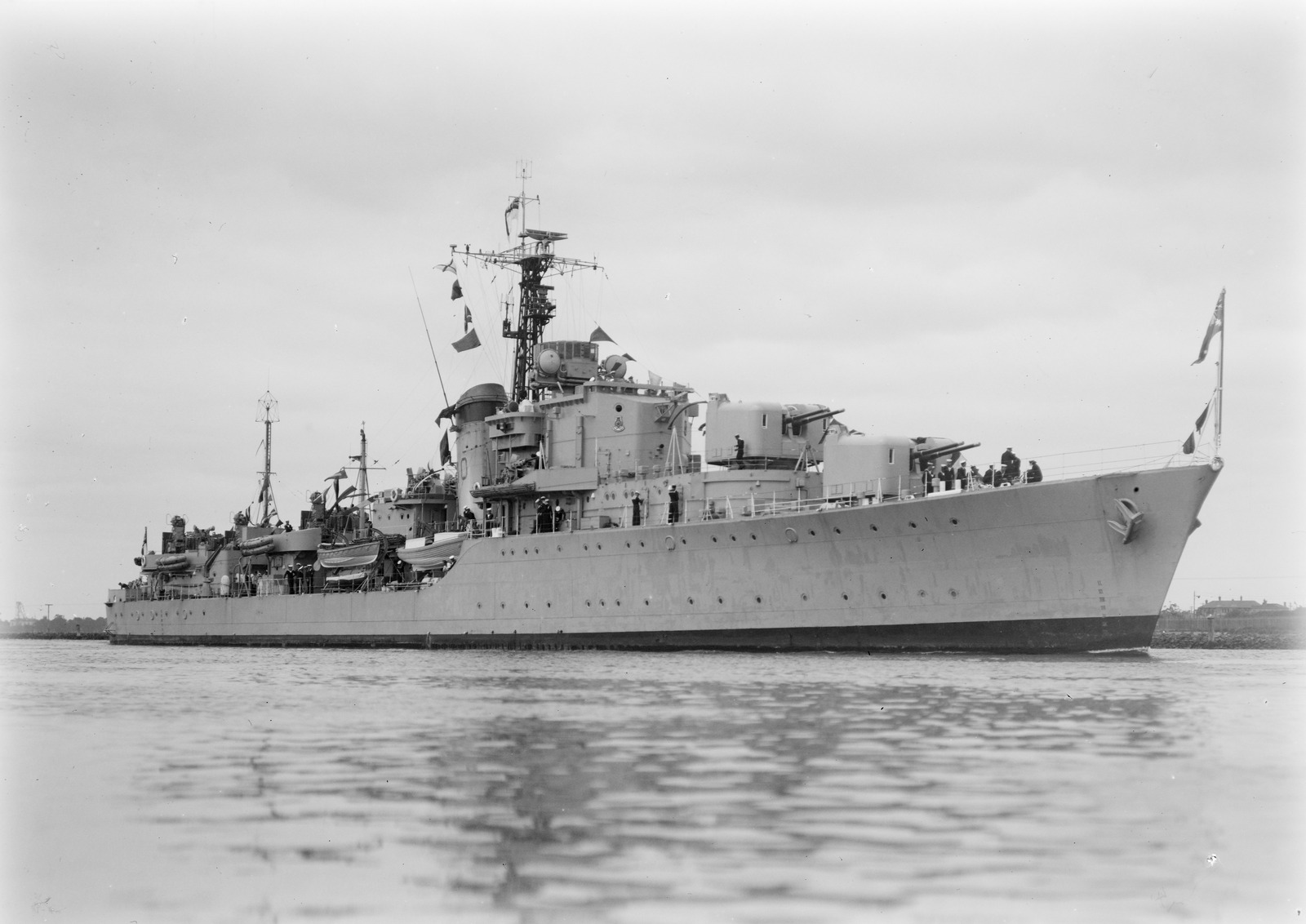
- HMAS Anzac

History

Australia
- Namesake: The Australian and New Zealand Army Corps
- Builder: Williamstown Naval Dockyard
- Laid down: 23 September 1946
- Launched: 20 August 1948
- Completed: 22 March 1951
- Commissioned: 14 March 1951
- Decommissioned: 4 October 1974
- Reclassified: Training ship (1961)
- Motto: "United We Stand"
- Honours and awards: Battle honours: Korea 1951–53; Malaya 1956
- Fate: Sold for scrap, 24 November 1975

General characteristics
- Class & type: Battle-class destroyer
- Displacement: 2,436 tons (as destroyer); 3,450 tons (as training ship)
- Length: 379 ft (116 m) overall; 355 ft (108 m) between perpendiculars
- Beam: 41 ft (12 m)
- Draught: 21 ft 11.5 in (6.693 m)
- Propulsion: 2 Admiralty 3-drum boilers, Parsons geared turbines, 50,000 shp, 2 shafts
- Speed: 31 knots (57 km/h; 36 mph)
- Complement: 320 as destroyer; 169 + 109 trainees as training ship
- Armament: 4 × QF 4.5 inch /45 (113 mm) Mark V guns in 2 twin mountings UD Mark VI; 12 × 40 mm Bofors anti-aircraft guns (3 twin, 6 single); 2 × 21 in 5-tube Pentad torpedo tube sets; Squid anti-submarine mortar

HMAS Anzac (D59) was a Battle-class destroyer of the Royal Australian Navy (RAN). Named after the Australian and New Zealand Army Corps, the destroyer was commissioned in 1951. The ship served on two tours of duty during the Korean War, and attempts to distinguish herself from British ships led to the practice of red kangaroo symbols on Australian warships. During 1956, Anzac served during the Malayan Emergency. In 1960, a malfunction in the destroyer's gun direction equipment caused Anzac to fire directly on sister ship HMAS Tobruk during a gunnery exercise, with Tobruk left unrepairable. In 1961, the destroyer was reclassified as a training vessel. Anzac remained in service until 1974, and was sold for breaking a year later.

== Design and construction ==
Anzac was built to the British Battle-class destroyer design. The ship had a displacement of 2,436 tons as designed, although this displacement increased to 3,450 tons after her 1963 reclassification as a training ship. She was 379 feet (116 m) long overall and 355 feet (108 m) long between perpendiculars, with a beam of 41 feet (12 m), and a draught of 21 feet 11.5 inches (6.69 m). Propulsion was provided by two Admiralty 3-drum boilers supplying steam to Parsons geared turbines; these generated 50,000 shaft horsepower (37,285 kW) for the destroyer's two propeller shafts. Anzac was designed to reach 31.5 knots (58.3 km/h; 36.2 mph), but could usually only reach 31 knots (57 km/h; 36 mph). The ship's company originally consisted of 320 personnel, but after conversion into a training ship, this changed to 169 ship's company plus 109 trainees.

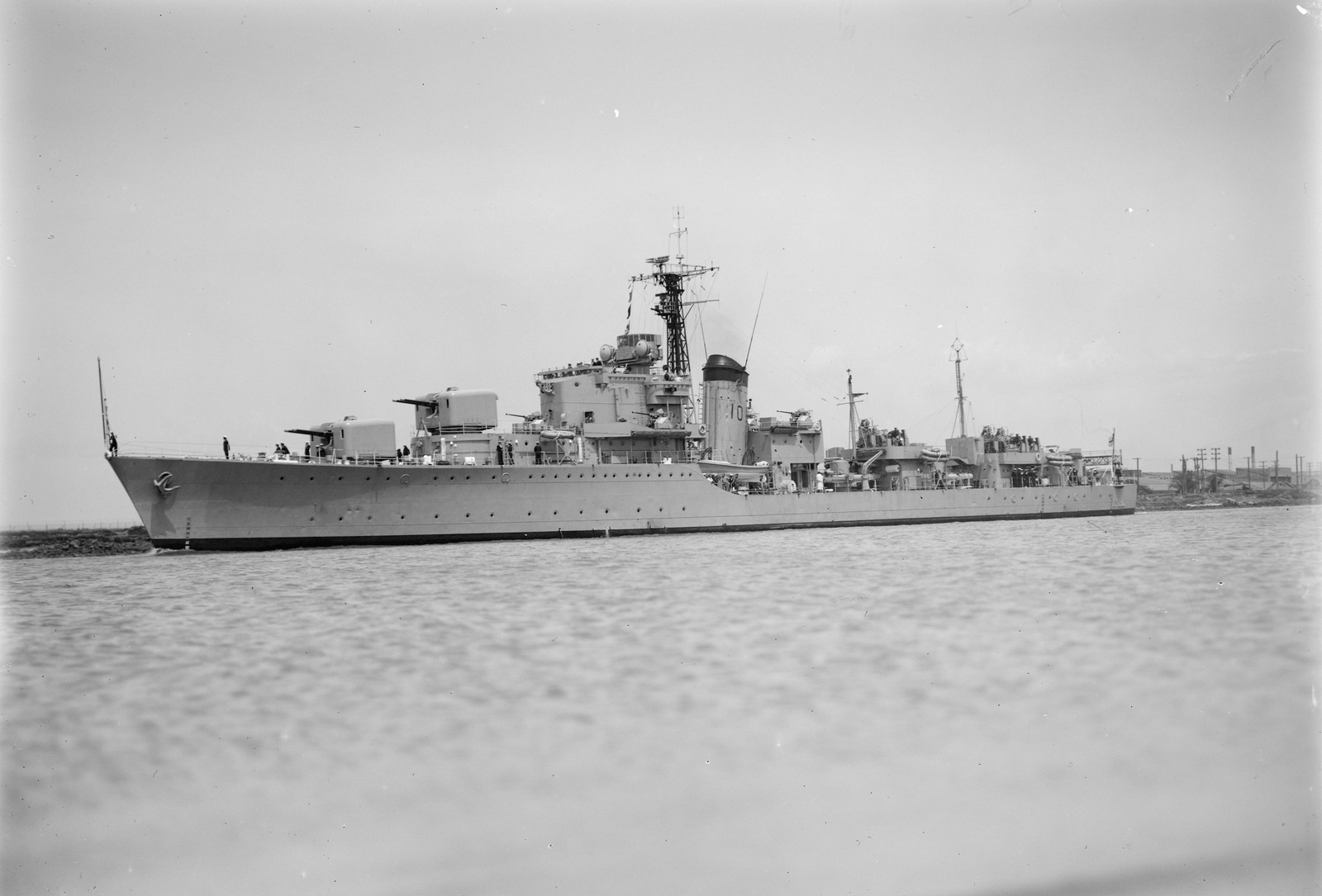
Lateral view

The main armament of Anzac consisted of four 4.5-inch (114 mm) Mark VI guns in two twin turrets. This was supplemented by twelve Bofors 40 mm guns for air defence, (three twin mountings and six single mountings, a Squid anti-submarine mortar, and two sets of 5-tube 21-inch (533 mm) Pentad torpedo launchers.

Anzac was laid down by the Williamstown Naval Dockyard at Melbourne, Victoria on 23 September 1946. The ship was originally to be named Matapan, for the Battle of Cape Matapan, but this was changed to Anzac, for the Australian and New Zealand Army Corps prior to launch. She was launched on 20 August 1948 by the wife of John Augustine Collins, the Chief of the Naval Staff and a former commanding officer of the previous HMAS Anzac. Anzac was commissioned as a ship of the RAN on 14 March 1951. Acceptance from dockyard hands occurred on 22 March.

== Operational history ==
On 30 July 1951, Anzac left Australian waters for her first deployment to the Korean War. Arriving in Japan on 14 August, the destroyer was assigned as an escort to the United States Navy (USN) escort carrier USS Sicily and operated off the west coast of Korea. Sicily was replaced by the Royal Navy (RN) light carrier HMS Glory on 2 September, and on 6 September, Anzac was ordered to shell a suspected communist position near Haeju, and fired in anger for the first time at 18:15. During 12–26 September, Anzac led US Ships Thompson and Naifeh in a blockade of Wosan, before returning to Japanese waters at the end of the month.

Her first Korean tour completed, Anzac escorted HMS Glory to Sydney, where they arrived on 20 October. The destroyer then proceeded to Melbourne for a refit, which lasted until the end of 1951, and remained in Australian waters until deploying with the cruiser HMAS Australia in April 1952 for a training cruise through Maritime Southeast Asia. After undergoing another, brief refit, Anzac rejoined the Korean War effort, and spent most of September patrolling the west coast of Korea, then joined the escort screen of the RN light carrier Ocean at the start of October. After a short break in Kure, the destroyer was assigned to patrols and shore bombardments on the west coast until 19 December, when she relieved HMCS Haida and assumed responsibility for the defence of Yongdo Island. Herself relieved on 3 January 1953, Anzac returned to the west coast of Korea, where she resumed patrols and bombardments. Apart from a brief stint on the east coast shelling supply lines and a visit to Tokyo to celebrate the coronation of Queen Elizabeth II, Anzac operated off the west coast until 13 June; the conclusion of her second Korean tour. Anzac arrived in Sydney on 3 July.

For her two tours, Anzac was awarded the battle honour "Korea 1951–53". During these tours, the ship's company often found themselves mistaken for British warships, as the RAN ensign at the time was identical to the British White Ensign, and the Battle class was a British design. To counteract this, the executive officer acquired the largest sheet of brass he could find, and had the kangaroo design from the reverse of the Australian penny cut from the sheet, which was then mounted to the top of the mainmast as a 'weathervane'. This method of identification was later adopted across the RAN: all major fleet units now bear a red kangaroo symbol on each side of their exhaust funnels or superstructure.

During late 1953 and early 1954, Anzac was assigned to Queen Elizabeth II's coronation tour. The destroyer carried the Queen, the Duke of Edinburgh, and other members of the Royal Party during visits to locations in Queensland, then Papua and New Guinea.

Anzac operated during the Malayan Emergency. Following an overhaul of the RAN battle honours system, the destroyer was retroactively awarded a second honour to recognise this: "Malaya 1956".

Between 1956 and 1959, the destroyer was deployed on several occasions to serve with the Far East Strategic Reserve.

In September 1960, Anzac was performing gunnery exercises with sister ship HMAS Tobruk. A malfunction in Anzac's gun direction equipment negated the deliberate 6° mis-aiming of her guns, with the resulting shell hitting Tobruk and doing enough damage to the destroyer to make repairs uneconomical. Two of Anzac's personnel were charged by the Naval Board, while Tobruk was decommissioned a month later.

In March 1961, Anzac completed conversion into a training ship. This conversion included the removal of several weapons systems, including the second 4.5-inch turret, and the conversion of the freed space to classrooms and training spaces. Cadet midshipmen from the RAN training facility at HMAS Creswell and supplementary list midshipmen (and in later years, trainees from the RAN's Papua New Guinea Division and from the Singapore Armed Forces) were embarked on three-month stints to receive practical experience and training in naval operations and duties. Training cruises typically occurred through the South Pacific, with several port visits to broaden the trainees' cultural horizons.

During February and March 1963, Anzac served as escort for Queen Elizabeth II and the Royal Yacht Britannia during the royal tour of Australia. In October, Anzac accompanied the troop transport Sydney on a training cruise in northern Queensland waters. During May and June 1964, the destroyer embarked the Governor-General, Viscount De L'Isle for a visit to the territories of Papua and New Guinea. In September 1965, Anzac and the carrier Melbourne escorted Sydney on the outbound leg of her second troop-transport voyage to Vietnam. On 21 May 1968, Anzac and Sydney left Brisbane on the latter's eleventh of twenty-five Vietnam voyages. The ships arrived at Vũng Tàu on 1 June, and returned to Brisbane on 13 June. During 1969, Anzac visited Tahiti and Western Samoa, and was in New Zealand for the bicentenary of James Cook's landing at Poverty Bay. In 1970, the destroyer was part of another bicentenary celebration of Cook's first voyage of discovery; this time at Cook's last Australian landfall at Possession Island. During the training cruises of the ship's final years, Anzac visited Papua New Guinea, Fiji, and New Zealand. HMAS Anzac escorted HMS Britannia during the Commonwealth Games held in Christchurch NZ during 1974 berthing at Lyttelton Harbour.

== Decommissioning and fate ==
Anzac was berthed at Garden Island on 11 August, in preparation for paying off. She was decommissioned on 4 October 1974, after travelling 639,582 nautical miles (1,184,506 km). She was sold for A$41,780 to the Hifirm Corporation Limited of Hong Kong on 26 November 1975, and departed Sydney on 30 December 1975 under tow by the Japanese tug Herakuresu.
