= Pohang Gyeongju Airport =

Airport in Pohang, North Gyeongsang, South Korea

Pohang Gyeongju Airport 포항경주공항
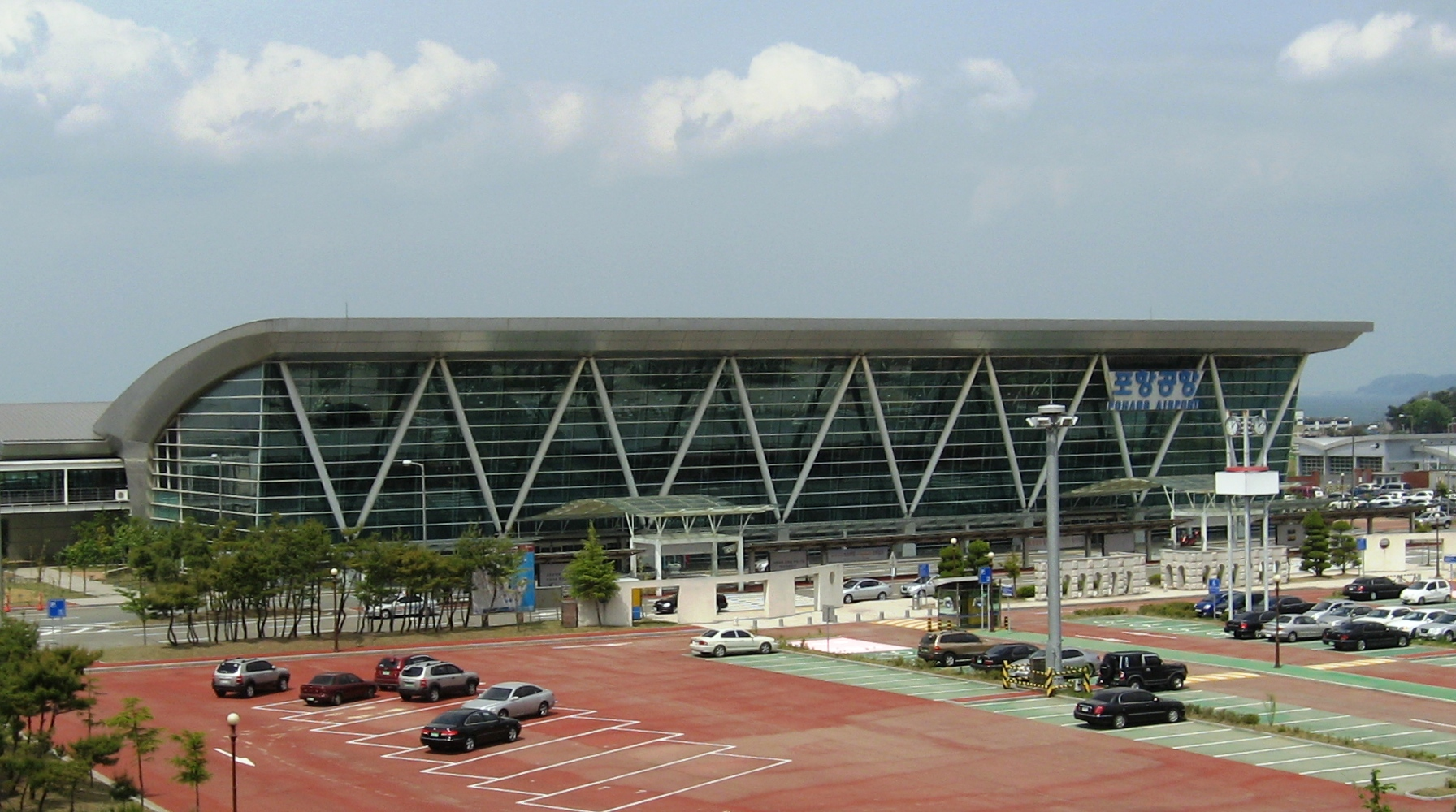
- IATA: KPO; ICAO: RKTH

Summary
- Airport type: Public / Military
- Owner: Ministry Land, Infrastructure and Transport
- Operator: Korea Airports Corporation; Republic of Korea Navy; United States Marine Corps
- Serves: Pohang; Gyeongju
- Location: Pohang, North Gyeongsang Province, South Korea
- Opened: February 1970; 56 years ago
- Elevation AMSL: 75 ft (23 m)
- Coordinates: 35°59′16″N 129°25′13″E
- Website: www.airport.co.kr/pohangeng

Map
- Location of airport in South Korea

Runways
Direction	Length		Surface
Direction	m	ft	Surface
10/28	2,134	7,000	Concrete

Statistics (2019)
- Passengers: 93,769
- Aircraft Movements: 1,162
- Cargo Tonnage: 395
- Source:KAC

- Pohang Gyeongju Airport
- Hangul: 포항경주공항
- Hanja: 浦項慶州空港
- RR: Pohang Gyeongju gonghang
- MR: P'ohang Kyŏngju konghang

Pohang Gyeongju Airport (IATA: KPO, ICAO: RKTH) is an airport in Pohang, North Gyeongsang Province, South Korea. In 2011, 255,227 passengers used the airport.

== History ==
Pohang Airfield was originally developed during the Japanese Imperial period.

=== Military ===
==== Pre-Korean war ====
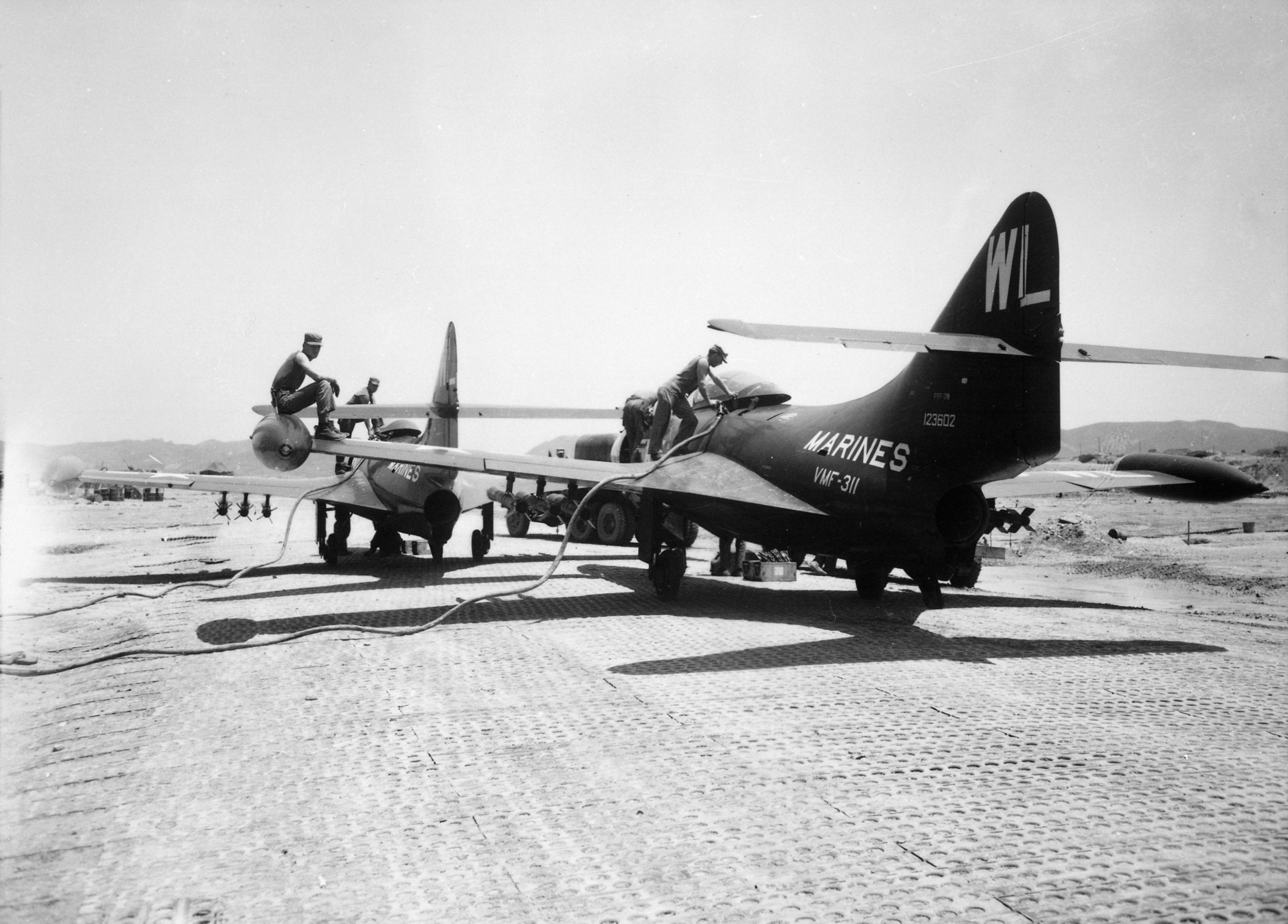
F9F-2s of VMF-311 at Pohang in 1951

In early July 1950 Pohang airfield was identified as a potential base for USAF operations. On 7 July, Brigadier-General Timberlake deputy-commander of the Fifth Air Force ordered the development of the base. Company A 802nd Engineer Aviation Battalion landed at Pohang and began improving the airfield on 12 July by added a 500 feet (150 m) PSP extension and building hardstands for 27 F-51 Mustangs. The airfield was designated by the USAF as K-3.

Troops of the Korean People's Army (KPA) 12th Division infiltrated the Pohang area in early August and made guerrilla attacks against the airfield. By 12 August KPA troops entered Pohang and so on 13 August the 35th Fighter-Interceptor Group evacuated to Tsuiki Air Field in Japan. ROK and U.S. forces routed the KPA several days later, but the continued presence of guerrilla units mitigated against an early return to the base.

USAF units based there from July–August 1950 included:

- 35th Fighter-Interceptor Group from 14 July-13 August 1950 subordinate units included:
  - 39th Fighter-Interceptor Squadron operating F-51s from 8–13 August 1950
  - 40th Fighter-Interceptor Squadron operating F-51s from 16 July-13 August 1950
- 6131st Air Base Squadron (later 6131st Tactical Support Wing) from 14 July 1950

The 802nd Battalion returned to Pohang on 27 September finding the airfield relatively undamaged. The 35th Fighter-Interceptor Group returned to Pohang on 3 October. On 12 October No. 77 Squadron RAAF operating F-51s arrived at Pohang.

In July 1953 the United States Navy deployed two AJ (A-2) Savage aircraft to K-3 as a nuclear deterrent in the final days of the Korean War.

==== Post-Korean War ====
In October 2008 the United States Navy relocated a permanent detachment of MH-53E Sea Dragons assigned to HM-14 from Iwakuni, Japan. This detachment provides Seventh Fleet with a forward-deployed AMCM and heavy-lift asset. Because Pohang Gyeongju Airport is sharing with military, taking photograph or video of apron, runway and military facility is strictly prohibited.

=== Civil operation ===
in the 1970, Pohang Airfield developed capacity for civil operations. Civil operations begain in 1986 with a route from Seoul route operated by Korean Air.

In the 1990s, Asiana Airlines started flights to Pohang Airport, its passenger terminal was expanded, and a new terminal was opened in June 2002. On 15 March 1999, Pohang Airport was the destination of Korean Air Flight 1533, a McDonnell Douglas MD-83 which was flying from Seoul to Pohang. The flight overshot the runway during landing at Pohang Airport. All 156 people on board survived, but the aircraft was destroyed. The accident was the 11th hull loss of a McDonnell Douglas MD-80.

In January 2014, Pohang Airport was closed due to its runway having to be repaved. This was completed in May 2016.

In 2020, Pohang and Gyeongju cities submitted a proposal to change the name of the airport from Pohang Airport to Pohang Gyeongju Airport to the Ministry of Land, Infrastructure and Transport. In 2022, government approval for the request was granted and the airport received its current name, Pohang Gyeongju Airport.

== Airlines and destinations ==
Airlines	Destinations
Jin Air	Jeju, Seoul–Gimpo

== Statistics ==
Air traffic statistics
	Aircraft operations	Passenger volume	Cargo tonnage
2001	8,345	774,029	1,964
2002	8,128	704,467	1,582
2003	7,608	645,494	2,086
2004	7,285	659,988	2,410
2005	4,968	464,653	1,677
2006	3,591	347,180	1,208
2007	2,831	297,702	980
2008	2,998	267,686	805
2009	3,746	304,372	865
2010	3,598	323,652	959
2011	3,542	260,050	860
2012	3,312	262,198	886
2013	3,131	239,516	909
2014	1,540	112,387	441
2015	0	0	0
2016	916	68,226	216
2017	1,373	98,391	323
2018	1,358	83,818	332
2019	1,162	93,769	395
2020	838	65,994	295
2021	1,868	158,927	697
2022	2,514	249,413	1,084
2023	2,053	253,703	1,149
Source: Korea Airports Corporation Traffic Statistics

== Access ==
=== Bus ===
- No. 200 : Yangdeok ↔ Lotte Department Store ↔ Jukdo Market ↔ POSCO ↔ Pohang Gyeongju Airport ↔ Guryongpo
