= Allan Walters =

Australian Air Force commander (1905–1968)

Allan Leslie Walters
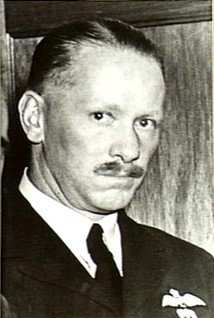
- Group Captain Allan Walters, 1942
- Born: 2 November 1905; Ascot Vale, Victoria
- Died: 19 October 1968 (aged 62); Heidelberg, Victoria
- Military career
- Allegiance: Australia
- Service/branch: Royal Australian Air Force
- Service years: 1928–1962
- Rank: Air Vice-Marshal
- Nickname: "Wally"
- Commands: No. 22 Squadron (1937–38); No. 3 Squadron (1938–39); No. 1 Squadron (1940–41); RAAF Station Laverton (1941–42); No. 1 Wing (1942–43); No. 72 Wing (1943–44); Northern Command (1945–46); Southern Area Command (1948–50); RAAF Overseas HQ (1951–52); Home Command (1954–57); Support Command (1959–62)
- Conflicts: World War II; South West Pacific Theatre; North Western Area campaign; New Guinea campaign
- Awards: Companion of the Order of the Bath; Commander of the Order of the British Empire; Air Force Cross; Mentioned in Despatches

Air Vice Marshal Allan Leslie Walters, CB, CBE, AFC (2 November 1905 – 19 October 1968) was a senior commander in the Royal Australian Air Force (RAAF). Born in Victoria and raised in Western Australia, he graduated from the Royal Military College, Duntroon, before transferring to the RAAF in 1928. He was one of the service's leading flying instructors and aerobatic pilots between the wars, and was appointed to his first squadron command in 1937. Over the course of World War II, Walters led No. 1 (General Reconnaissance) Squadron in Singapore, No. 1 (Fighter) Wing in Darwin, Northern Territory, No. 72 Wing in Dutch New Guinea, and Northern Command in Papua New Guinea. He was decorated with the Air Force Cross in 1941 for his work with No. 1 Squadron, and mentioned in despatches in 1944 for his service with No. 72 Wing.

Walters was appointed a Commander of the Order of the British Empire in 1946 for his service with Northern Command. Already marked out for senior roles in the post-war RAAF, his positions during the 1950s included Air Officer Commanding (AOC) Southern Area Command, AOC RAAF Overseas Headquarters in London, Head of the Australian Joint Services Staff in Washington, D.C., AOC Home Command, Air Member for Personnel, and AOC Support Command. He was promoted acting air vice marshal in 1952 (substantive in 1954), and appointed a Companion of the Order of the Bath in 1956. Popularly known as "Wally", he was twice a candidate for Chief of the Air Staff, and twice passed over. He retired from the RAAF in 1962 and made his home in Melbourne, where he died in 1968, aged sixty-two.

== Early career ==
Allan Leslie Walters was born on 2 November 1905 in Ascot Vale, Victoria, to schoolteacher Arthur Ferdinand Walters and his wife Edith Mary (née Russell). The family soon moved to Perth, Western Australia, and Allan completed his education at Perth Modern School, where he joined the cadets. After leaving school and spending eight months in the militia, he entered the Royal Military College, Duntroon, in February 1924. At Duntroon he specialised in field artillery, and excelled at athletics. Graduating as a lieutenant in December 1927, he transferred to the Royal Australian Air Force (RAAF) on 1 February 1928. Walters' preferred career path in the military was engineering, and it was only when he failed to gain selection for this field after his graduation that he applied to transfer to the Air Force, which, having no cadet college of its own, had arranged with Duntroon to take one of its artillery specialists each year for secondment as a pilot. He commenced his course at RAAF Point Cook, Victoria, in mid-1928, and graduated as a flying officer in March 1929. Walters showed an aptitude for instruction, and after further training was graded an 'A1' flight instructor, a rare distinction. Posted to No. 3 Squadron at RAAF Station Richmond, New South Wales, operating Westland Wapitis, he also made a name for himself performing aerobatics at air shows throughout the country. Walters put this particular talent to use in pursuit of his wife-to-be, Jean Manning, stunt flying above All Saints Church, North Parramatta, where her father was rector. Reverend Manning married the couple there on 30 June 1930; their daughter Robin was born in Richmond.

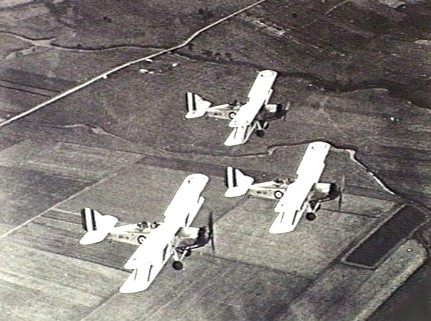
Westland Wapitis of No. 3 Squadron in the Richmond area, October 1932

Walters was granted a permanent commission in the Air Force in 1930. On 5 January 1931, by now promoted flight lieutenant, he won a trophy in an air obstacle race at the Cootamundra Air Pageant. In May the following year, he took out the NSW Air Derby and Evening News Cup. He temporarily commanded No. 3 Squadron during October 1933, in the absence of Squadron Leader Bill Bostock. At the time, the commanding officer of No. 3 Squadron also held command of RAAF Station Richmond. Walters was posted to Britain in 1936 to attend the Royal Air Force Staff College, Andover, and was promoted to squadron leader in March 1937, while still overseas. He also undertook a naval reconnaissance course at RAF Manston. Returning to Australia in May, he took command of No. 22 Squadron in June, flying Hawker Demons and Avro Ansons out of Richmond until February 1938.

Between 6 and 23 February 1938, Walters piloted the first overseas flight in an aeroplane designed and built in Australia when he flew the Chief of the Air Staff, Air Vice Marshal Richard Williams, to Singapore in the Straits Settlements in a Tugan Gannet. He returned to Richmond in May 1938 to lead No. 3 Squadron, operating Demons, and again took part in aerobatic displays. On 25 October 1938, his Demon crashed in scrub at Tumbi Umbi, New South Wales, when the engine failed shortly after taking off for Richmond, but he was not injured. Completing his Richmond appointment in May 1939, Walters transferred to Melbourne as Director of Staff Duties at RAAF Headquarters. Later that month, he joined Group Captain Henry Wrigley as an expert assessor on the panel of an inquiry into a recent series of three Anson accidents; the full report handed down in October found human error the likely explanation for at least one crash and that training on the type followed the syllabus laid down, but that pilots needed more practical experience in dealing with potential in-flight incidents.

== World War II ==
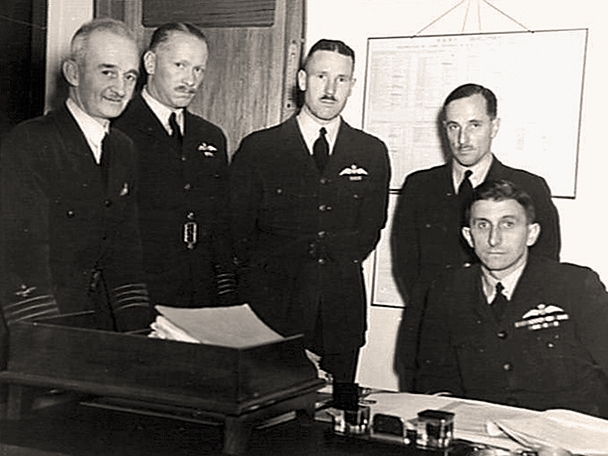
Group Captain Walters (second from left) in May 1942 with members of HQ Allied Air Forces SWPA, including Group Captain Val Hancock (centre), Air Commodore Joe Hewitt (second from right), and newly appointed Chief of the Air Staff, Air Vice Marshal George Jones (right, seated)

Walters' first operational appointment following the outbreak of World War II was as commanding officer of No. 1 (General Reconnaissance) Squadron, which he led to Sembawang, Singapore, in July 1940. His promotion to temporary wing commander was announced the same month. He had earlier travelled incognito to Singapore on a Qantas Empire flying boat, which had been specifically requested to deviate from its normal flight path so that he could reconnoiter airfields in the Dutch East Indies. Deployed in response to fears of Japanese expansion in Malaya, No. 1 Squadron was the first Australian unit equipped with Lockheed Hudson light bombers, which were employed primarily for maritime patrol work. Walters was awarded the Air Force Cross for his "very active part in all operations" and for training his unit to "a particularly high standard"; the honour was gazetted in the 1941 King's Birthday Honours. He succeeded Frank Lukis as commanding officer of RAAF Station Laverton, Victoria, in May the same year, and was promoted acting group captain. In May 1942, he joined Allied Air Forces Headquarters, South West Pacific Area (SWPA), in Melbourne as Assistant Director of Operations. He was made a temporary group captain in September, and transferred to Headquarters RAAF Command as senior air staff officer.

On 7 October 1942, Walters took command of a new formation, No. 1 (Fighter) Wing, at RAAF Station Richmond. Established to boost the air defence capability of Australia's North-Western Area, the wing comprised three Supermarine Spitfire squadrons that had been transferred from Europe: No. 54 Squadron RAF, No. 452 Squadron RAAF and No. 457 Squadron RAAF. With Wing Commander Clive Caldwell, Australia's top-scoring flying ace of the war, as his wing leader, Walters began deploying aircraft and men to Darwin, Northern Territory, in December, providing a fillip for morale in the region. Proudly declaring himself Australia's oldest fighter pilot, Walters was reported as taking every opportunity to join his men in the air. He flew as Caldwell's wingman in No. 1 Wing's first major action against the Japanese over Darwin on 2 May 1943. Eight Spitfires crashed and several others made forced landings, for the destruction of one Japanese bomber and five fighters. Walters narrowly avoiding being shot down when he warned Caldwell of an attacking enemy fighter, to the detriment of his own safety. After they landed, Caldwell chided his commander, "You silly old so-and-so. You want to look after your own skin instead of worrying about someone else's!" On 20 June, Walters participated in the wing's most successful combat against the Japanese to that time, personally accounting for one of fourteen raiders claimed by the Spitfires, for the loss of two of their own number. He posted out of Darwin a few days later, having earned the admiration of Caldwell and the rest of the wing's personnel.

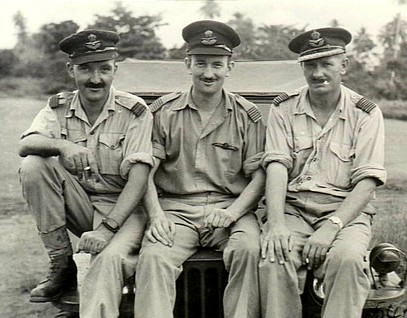
Walters (right) as Officer Commanding No. 72 Wing in New Guinea, December 1943

Walters assumed command of No. 5 Service Flying Training School in Uranquinty, New South Wales, on 30 June 1943, but the next month was posted to Merauke in Dutch New Guinea to take over No. 72 Wing following reassignment of its original commander, Group Captain Charles Eaton. Comprising No. 84 Squadron (flying CAC Boomerang fighters), No. 86 Squadron (Curtiss P-40 Kittyhawk fighters), and No. 12 Squadron (Vultee A-31 Vengeance dive bombers), No. 72 Wing came under the control of RAAF North-Eastern Area Command, and undertook air defence and patrol tasks in and around western New Guinea. Group Captain Bill Hely assumed command of No. 72 Wing in May 1944, and Walters was appointed Director of Staff Policy and Plans at RAAF Headquarters. He was mentioned in despatches on 28 October 1944 for his "Gallant & distinguished service" in North-Eastern Area, the award being promulgated on 9 March 1945.

In February 1945, Walters was promoted to acting air commodore and took over from Air Commodore Lukis as Air Officer Commanding (AOC) Northern Command, directing its operations in New Guinea, New Britain and Bougainville until the end of the war. Headquartered at Madang in Papua New Guinea, Northern Command had previously been a large mobile formation known as No. 9 (Operational) Group but had evolved into a garrison force, its mobile function supplanted by No. 10 (Operational) Group (later First Tactical Air Force). Northern Command's operational formations included No. 71 Wing in northern New Guinea, No. 74 Wing at Port Moresby, and No. 84 Wing on Bougainville. No. 71 Wing, commanded by Group Captain Val Hancock, supported the Australian 6th Division during the Aitape–Wewak campaign, despite ordnance deficiencies that at one stage led to its squadrons arming their Bristol Beauforts with captured Japanese bombs. No. 84 Wing suffered shortages in pilots and equipment during the Bougainville campaign, and morale problems following the end of the war owing to inactivity and the uncertainties of demobilisation; as a result, the wing's commanding officer sent Northern Command headquarters a frank report, the tone of which earned a rebuke from Walters. In September, Walters represented the RAAF at the Japanese surrender ceremonies in Wewak.

== Post-war career ==
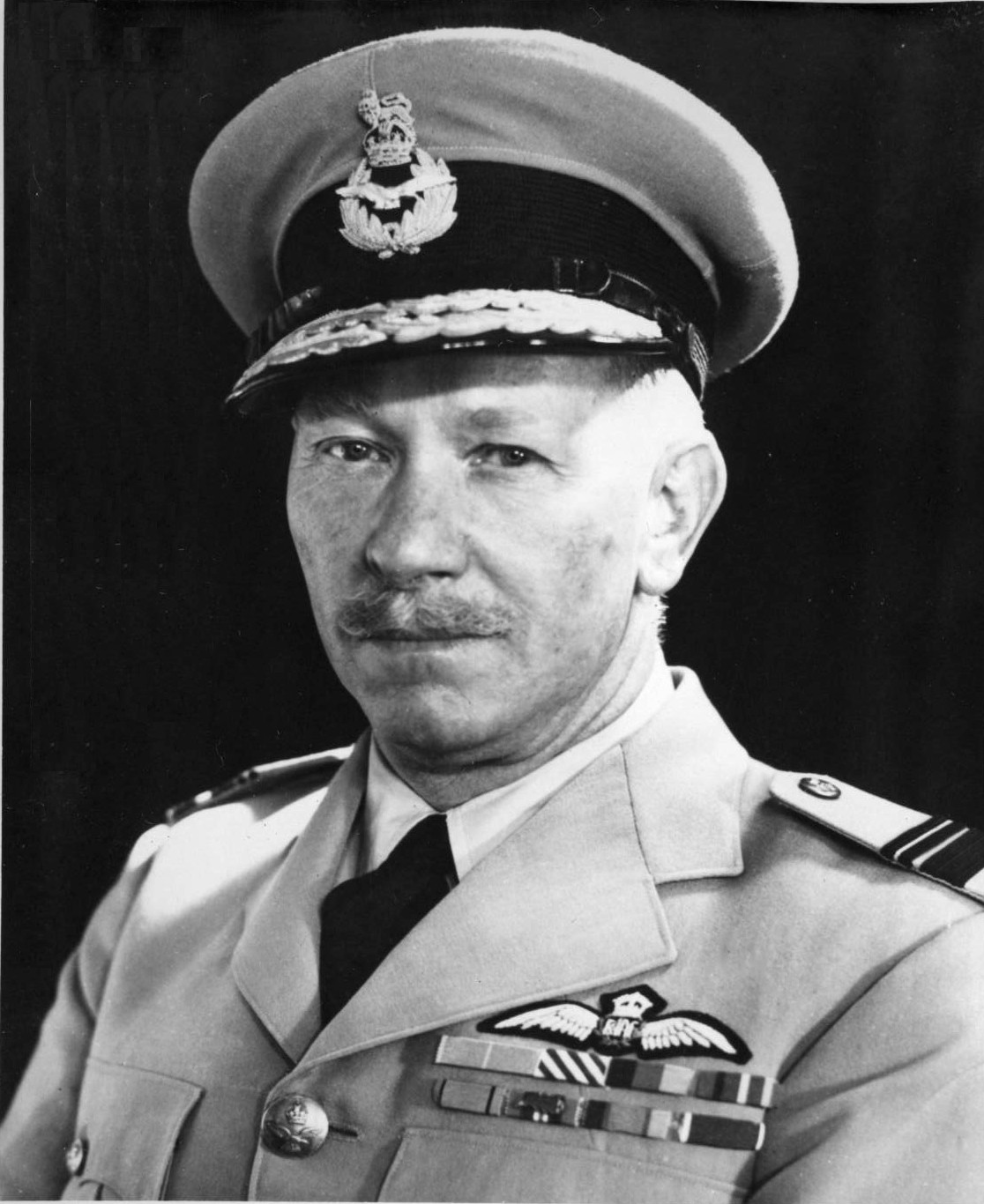
Air Vice Marshal Walters as Air Officer Commanding Home Command, 1954

Walters was appointed a Commander of the Order of the British Empire (CBE) in the King's Birthday Honours on 25 June 1946, for his "conspicuous service in operations against the Japanese" while leading Northern Command during the war. After completing his term as AOC Northern Command that year, Walters again became Director of Staff Plans and Policy at RAAF Headquarters. He attended the Imperial Defence College, London, in 1947. Walters was among a small coterie of highly regarded operational commanders, including Air Commodores John McCauley, Fred Scherger and Val Hancock, earmarked by the Australian Air Board for senior leadership roles in the post-war RAAF. In the short term, he remained a temporary air commodore—with the substantive rank of group captain from May 1947—as the officer corps shrank drastically with demobilisation. He was selected as AOC Southern Area Command, hub of the RAAF's training organisation, in March 1948. The following month, he flew to Morotai to preside over a court-martial for an RAAF airman accused of killing an officer of the Dutch merchant marine; the airman was acquitted.

In January 1951, Walters was appointed AOC RAAF Overseas Headquarters in London. That December, he was part of the Australian contingent at the Commonwealth Air Forces Conference, where an RAAF presence was sought in the Middle East; this eventually resulted in No. 78 Wing being re-formed and deployed to Malta in July 1952. Although Walters was keen to use the opportunity to acquire the RAAF's first North American F-86 Sabres, political realities led him to negotiate a deal whereby the wing was equipped with leased British de Havilland Vampire FB.9s. In October 1952, Walters was promoted to acting air vice marshal and posted to Washington, D.C., to head up the Australian Joint Services Staff as successor to Air Vice Marshal Scherger. Walters' rank was made permanent in January 1954, when he succeeded Air Vice Marshal McCauley to become AOC Home Command. Walters held this post, responsible for directing the RAAF's combat units, for three years. His tenure witnessed the introduction of the CAC Sabre to operational service with the Air Force, when No. 3 Squadron took delivery of its first machine in March 1956.

Walters was appointed a Companion of the Order of the Bath (CB) in the 1956 New Year Honours. In March 1957, he was one of three candidates, along with Air Vice Marshals Scherger and Hancock, touted as possible successors to Air Marshal McCauley as Chief of the Air Staff (CAS), the RAAF's senior position. Though Walters was considered to be very able, Scherger had long been regarded as outstanding and was "easily the best material on offer" according to a former CAS, Air Marshal Sir Donald Hardman. Scherger gained the appointment, and Walters became Air Member for Personnel (AMP) on 21 October. As AMP he occupied a seat on the Air Board, the service's controlling body that comprised its senior officers and was chaired by the CAS. In this role Walters endorsed the recommendations of a review by the AOC Training Command, Air Vice Marshal Ian McLachlan, that led to a policy of RAAF College cadets undertaking academic degrees, in line with similar institutions in the other armed services; the college was subsequently renamed RAAF Academy. Walters served as AMP until August 1959. The following month he was appointed AOC Support Command, a new organisation created by merging the RAAF's former Training and Maintenance Commands. When Scherger's term as CAS was due to complete in May 1961, Walters and Hancock were once more put forward to the Minister for Air as potential replacements. "Walters was again unlucky", in the words of Air Force historians Alan Stephens and Jeff Isaacs, Hancock's "professional ability, operational experience and personal qualities" being deemed more appropriate for the role.

== Retirement ==
Walters left the RAAF on 16 May 1962, after completing his posting at Headquarters Support Command. His pending retirement and succession by Air Vice Marshal Douglas Candy had been announced the previous November. Walters followed horse racing in private life. He died from cardiorenal failure in Heidelberg, Melbourne, on 19 October 1968, and was accorded an Air Force funeral at The Scots Church, Melbourne. His pall bearers included two former CASs, Air Marshals Sir Richard Williams and Sir George Jones, along with Air Vice Marshals Henry Wrigley, Joe Hewitt, Colin Hannah, and Douglas Candy.

== Notes ==
Military offices
Preceded by Air Vice Marshal John McCauley	Air Officer Commanding Home Command; 1954–1957	Succeeded by Air Vice Marshal Douglas Candy
Preceded by Air Commodore Frank Headlam	Air Member for Personnel; 1957–1959	Succeeded by Air Commodore Frank Headlam
