= Frank Headlam =

Royal Australian Air Force senior commander

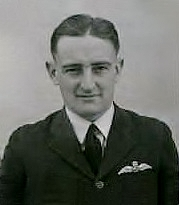
- Wing Commander Headlam, c. 1941–43
- Born: 15 July 1914; Launceston, Tasmania
- Died: 23 December 1976 (aged 62); Melbourne, Victoria
- Military career
- Allegiance: Australia
- Branch: Royal Australian Air Force
- Service years: 1934–71
- Rank: Air Vice Marshal
- Commands: No. 2 Squadron (1941–42); North-Western Area Command (1946); No. 90 Wing (1950–51); RAF Tengah (1951); Operational Command (1961–62); No. 224 Group RAF (1962–65); Support Command (1966–67); Joint Services Staff, London (1968–71)
- Conflicts: World War II; Malayan Emergency; Indonesia–Malaysia confrontation
- Awards: Companion of the Order of the Bath; Commander of the Order of the British Empire

Air Vice Marshal Frank Headlam, CB, CBE (15 July 1914 – 23 December 1976) was a senior commander in the Royal Australian Air Force (RAAF). Born and educated in Tasmania, he joined the RAAF as an air cadet in January 1934. He specialised in flying instruction and navigation before the outbreak of World War II. In April 1941, he became commanding officer of No. 2 Squadron, which operated Lockheed Hudsons. The squadron was deployed to Dutch Timor in December, and saw action against Japanese forces in the South West Pacific. After returning to Australia in February 1942, Headlam held staff appointments and training commands, finishing the war a group captain.

Headlam served as Officer Commanding North-Western Area in 1946, and as Director of Training from 1947 to 1950. In 1950–51, during the Malayan Emergency, he was stationed at Singapore as commander of No. 90 (Composite) Wing and, later, RAF Tengah. He twice served as acting Air Member for Personnel, in 1957 and 1959–60, receiving appointment as a Commander of the Order of the British Empire in 1958. Promoted air vice marshal, he successively held the positions of Air Officer Commanding (AOC) Operational Command in 1961–62, AOC No. 224 Group RAF from 1962 to 1965 during the Indonesia–Malaysia Konfrontasi, Deputy Chief of the Air Staff in 1965–66, and AOC Support Command in 1966–67. He was appointed a Companion of the Order of the Bath in 1965. Following a posting to London as Head of the Australian Joint Services Staff from 1968 to 1971, he retired from the Air Force and died in Melbourne five years later.

== Early career ==
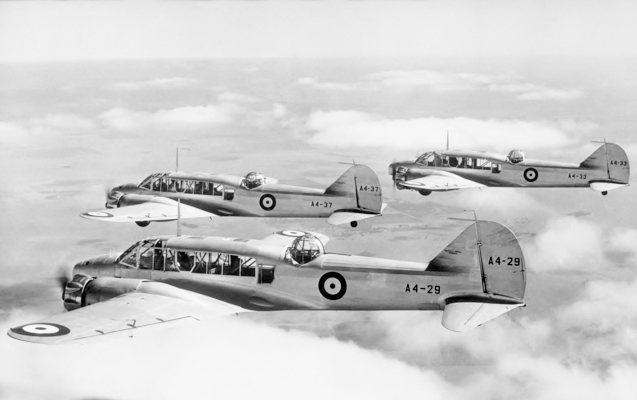
RAAF Avro Ansons in 1938; Flight Lieutenant Headlam flew a similar model around Australia on a long-distance navigation exercise in November that year.

The son of farmers Malcolm and Hilda Headlam, Frank Headlam was born on 15 July 1914 in Launceston, Tasmania. He was schooled at Clemes College, Hobart, and matriculated in 1932. Against the wishes of his parents he joined the Royal Australian Air Force (RAAF) as an air cadet on 16 January 1934. He underwent flying instruction with No. 1 Flying Training School (FTS) at RAAF Point Cook, Victoria, and was commissioned as a pilot officer on 1 January 1935.

After completing a conversion course, Headlam was assigned to the Seaplane Squadron at Point Cook. No larger than a flight according to the official history of the pre-war RAAF, Seaplane Squadron was part of No. 1 FTS and operated Supermarine Southampton flying boats and de Havilland Gipsy Moth floatplanes, among other types. During this posting Headlam was promoted to flying officer, on 1 July 1935, and wrote a paper on national defence in which he suggested that with "strong air forces, naval forces (including submarines), and fixed defences, Australia may be made practically invulnerable". According to Air Force historian Alan Stephens, this paper "in effect, defined the 'anti-lodgment' concept which has been a persistent feature of RAAF strategic thinking".

Headlam completed a flying instructors course in July 1936 and joined the staff of No. 1 FTS. He was promoted to flight lieutenant on 1 March 1937. Commencing in July 1938, he was one of six students to take part in the RAAF's first Long Specialist Navigation Course, run by Flight Lieutenants Bill Garing and Alister Murdoch at Point Cook. The course involved several epic training flights that attracted considerable media attention, including a twelve-day, 10,800-kilometre (6,700 mi) round-Australia trip by three Avro Ansons, one of which was piloted by Headlam, in November. The following month, Headlam led the three Ansons on a six-day journey back and forth over Central Australia. He subsequently passed the navigation course with a special distinction. On 27 January 1939 he was posted to RAAF Station Laverton, Victoria, as a flight commander. He served initially with No. 2 Squadron, before transferring to No. 1 Squadron on 29 August. Both units operated Ansons.

== World War II ==
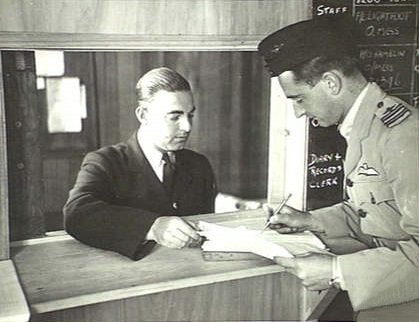
Headlam (right) at Laverton in February 1940

Following the outbreak of World War II, No. 1 Squadron undertook convoy escort and maritime reconnaissance duties off south-eastern Australia. Headlam continued to serve with the squadron as a flight commander until 15 January 1940, when he was assigned to Headquarters Laverton as the station navigation officer. On 27 March he was posted to the staff of RAAF Headquarters, Melbourne. He was promoted to squadron leader on 1 June 1940. Two weeks later he married Katherine Bridge at St Paul's Anglican Church in Frankston; the couple had a son and a daughter.

Headlam was given command of No. 2 Squadron at Laverton on 15 April 1941, and raised to wing commander on 1 July. Equipped with Lockheed Hudsons, the squadron mainly conducted maritime patrols in southern waters until 5 December, when four of its aircraft were ordered to Darwin, Northern Territory, in response to fears of Japanese aggression in the Pacific. On 7 December, this detachment established itself at Penfui, near Koepang in Dutch Timor; No. 2 Squadron's eight remaining Hudsons were stationed at Darwin on standby. The following day, aware that Australia was now at war in the Pacific, one of the Penfui-based Hudsons attacked the Japanese pearler Nanyo Maru, which was suspected of being a radio ship, and forced it aground. By 12 December, Headlam had transferred to Penfui as commanding officer of the base and No. 2 Squadron.

During January 1942, No. 2 Squadron's aircraft were dispersed at Penfui, Boeroe Island, and Darwin. The Penfui detachment attacked Japanese shipping taking part in the invasion of Celebes. Two Hudsons shot down or damaged three Japanese floatplanes that attacked them as they were bombing a transport ship on 11 January; the next day both Hudsons were shot down by Mitsubishi Zeros. Penfui was bombed by the Japanese for the first time on 26 January 1942, and attacked regularly thereafter, damaging some aircraft. The intact Hudsons were withdrawn to Darwin but Headlam and his staff remained at Penfui so the base could be used by aircraft during reconnaissance missions from Australia. On 18 February, Headlam was ordered to evacuate all his personnel except a small party to demolish the airfield with assistance from Sparrow Force. He returned to Darwin the next day, just as the city experienced its first raid by the Japanese. Four of No. 2 Squadron's Hudsons were destroyed in the attack; the remainder were relocated to Daly Waters, where they continued to carry out reconnaissance and bombing missions against Japanese targets in Timor.

Headlam remained in Darwin as Controller of Operations at Headquarters North-Western Area Command until 12 May 1942, when he was posted to Nhill, Victoria, as commanding officer of No. 2 Air Navigation School, operating Ansons. No. 97 (Reserve) Squadron was formed from the school's personnel in June. On 20 July 1943, Headlam took command of No. 2 Air Observer School (AOS), also operating Ansons, at Mount Gambier, South Australia. He was promoted to group captain on 1 December 1943, and was appointed the inaugural commanding officer of No. 3 AOS, operating Ansons and Fairey Battles out of Port Pirie, on 9 December. After handing over command of No. 3 AOS, he commenced studies at RAAF Staff School in Mount Martha, Victoria, on 2 October 1944. He was appointed senior administrative staff officer at North-Western Area Command on 12 January 1945.

== Post-war career ==
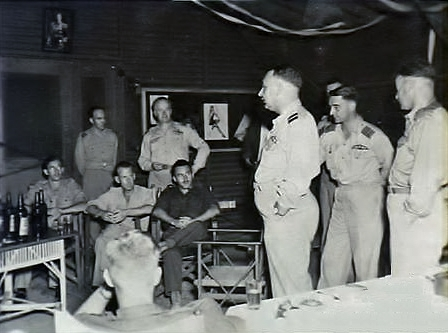
Group Captain Headlam (second from right) and Air Vice-Marshal Alan Charlesworth (standing centre), of North-Western Area Command, welcome repatriated prisoners of war to Darwin in September 1945.

Headlam became Officer Commanding North-Western Area in January 1946. Posted to Britain at the end of the year, he attended the Royal Air Force Staff College, Andover, and served with RAAF Overseas Headquarters, London. On his return to Australia, in November 1947, he became Director of Training at RAAF Headquarters. In November 1950, Headlam was appointed to take over command of No. 90 (Composite) Wing from Group Captain Paddy Heffernan. Headquartered at RAF Changi, Singapore, No. 90 Wing controlled RAAF units operating during the Malayan Emergency: No. 1 (Bomber) Squadron, flying Avro Lincolns, and No. 38 (Transport) Squadron, flying Douglas C-47 Dakotas. The Lincolns conducted area bombing missions over communist-held territory, as well as strikes against pinpoint targets. The Dakotas were tasked with courier flights, VIP transport and medical evacuations across South East Asia, and in Malaya with airlifting troops and cargo, dropping supplies to friendly forces and despatching propaganda leaflets. Headlam was slightly injured on 20 December, when a No. 38 Squadron Dakota he was co-piloting on a supply drop crash-landed at Kampong Aur in Pahang, following engine failure. In August 1951 he was named commander of RAF Tengah, Singapore, while retaining his post as commanding officer of No. 90 Wing. Headlam handed over command of No. 90 Wing in December 1951.

On 19 February 1952, Headlam became senior air staff officer (SASO) at Eastern Area Command in Penrith, New South Wales. During his term as SASO, the RAAF began re-equipping with English Electric Canberra jet bombers and CAC Sabre jet fighters. The Air Force also underwent a major organisational change, as it transitioned from a geographically based command-and-control system to one based on function, resulting in the establishment of Home (operational), Training, and Maintenance Commands. Eastern Area Command, considered a de facto operational headquarters owing to the preponderance of combat units under its control, was reorganised as Home Command in October 1953. Headlam was appointed an Officer of the Order of the British Empire (OBE) in the 1954 New Year Honours for his "exceptional ability and devotion to duty". He was promoted to acting air commodore in May. His appointment as aide-de-camp to Queen Elizabeth II was announced on 7 October 1954.

Headlam was promoted to substantive air commodore on 1 January 1955. In November he was posted to RAAF Overseas Headquarters, London, and the following year undertook studies at the Imperial Defence College. Returning to Australia, he served as acting Air Member for Personnel at the Department of Air, Canberra, from 19 March to 21 October 1957, between the terms of Air Vice Marshals Fred Scherger and Allan Walters, and again from 24 August 1959 to 28 March 1960, between the terms of Walters and Air Vice Marshal Bill Hely. In this role Headlam occupied a seat on the Air Board, the service's controlling body that comprised its senior officers and was chaired by the Chief of the Air Staff. He was also one of two RAAF representatives to serve on a committee, chaired by businessman William John Allison, examining conditions of defence service; the committee's recommendations led to a doubling of flight pay, among other improvements. Headlam's other positions at the Department of Air included Air Commodore Plans from October 1957 to January 1959, and Director General Plans and Policy from January to August 1959. The latter assignment put him in charge of the RAAF's Directorate of Intelligence. Headlam was appointed a Commander of the Order of the British Empire (CBE) in the 1958 Queen's Birthday Honours, gazetted on 3 June. In May 1960 he became acting Deputy Chief of the Air Staff.

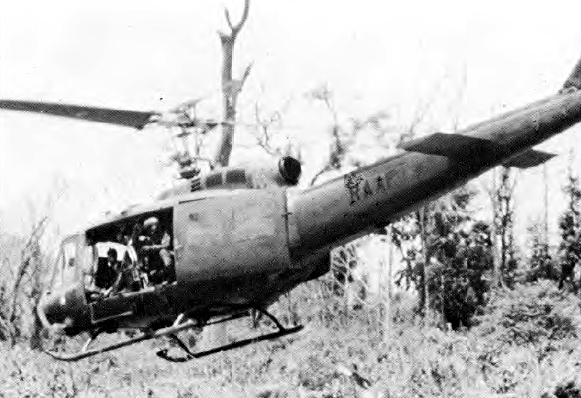
Bell UH-1 Iroquois of No. 9 Squadron in Vietnam; Headlam planned the RAAF's initial helicopter deployment to the region while Deputy Chief of the Air Staff in 1966.

On 30 January 1961, Headlam joined the staff of Operational Command (OPCOM), the successor organisation to Home Command, responsible for the direction of RAAF operational units. He took over as Air Officer Commanding (AOC) OPCOM from Air Vice Marshal Val Hancock in April. Headlam was promoted to air vice marshal on 29 May. On 17 July 1962, he was posted to RAAF Base Butterworth, Malaya, and took up the appointment of AOC No. 224 Group RAF in Singapore one week later. He was succeeded as AOC OPCOM by Air Vice Marshal Alister Murdoch. As AOC No. 224 Group, Headlam had overall responsibility for regional air defence and offensive air operations during the Brunei Rebellion in December 1962, and the subsequent Konfrontasi between Indonesia and Malaysia that officially began the following month. Divorced from his first wife in 1956, he married widowed social worker Vernon Spence at the Sydney registry office on 20 January 1964. He handed over No. 224 Group to Air Vice Marshal Christopher Foxley-Norris on 30 November.

Returning to Australia, Headlam became Deputy Chief of the Air Staff (DCAS) on 26 January 1965. He was appointed a Companion of the Order of the Bath (CB) "in recognition of distinguished service in the Borneo Territories" on 22 June. His tenure as DCAS coincided with the most significant rearmament program the Air Force had undertaken since World War II, and with manpower shortages stemming from this expansion and from Australia's increasing involvement in the security of South East Asia. The first RAAF helicopters were committed to the Vietnam War towards the end of his term, and he travelled to Saigon with the Chief of the General Staff, Lieutenant General Sir John Wilton, in March 1966 to plan the deployment. The year before, Wilton had recommended to Air Marshal Murdoch, the Chief of the Air Staff, that two Iroquois be sent to Vietnam for familiarisation purposes; Murdoch had rebuffed Wilton, and the RAAF helicopter squadron was considered underprepared for its army co-operation role when it finally did deploy. Headlam succeeded Air Vice Marshal Douglas Candy as AOC Support Command, Melbourne, on 8 August 1966. Support Command had been formed in 1959, by merging the RAAF's former Training and Maintenance Commands. On 1 January 1968, Headlam was posted to London as Head of the Australian Joint Services Staff. He served as an Extra Gentleman Usher to the Queen from 17 November 1970 to 5 June 1971.

== Retirement ==
Returning to Australia in June 1971, Headlam took resettlement leave before retiring from the Air Force on 3 August. He made his home in Melbourne, where he died aged 62 on 23 December 1976, after a lengthy battle with cancer. Survived by his children and his second wife, he was given a private funeral and cremated at Springvale Crematorium.

== Notes ==
Military offices
Preceded by Air Vice Marshal Frederick Scherger	Air Member for Personnel (Acting); 1957	Succeeded by Air Vice Marshal Allan Walters
Preceded by Air Vice Marshal Allan Walters	Air Member for Personnel (Acting); 1959–1960	Succeeded by Air Vice Marshal William Hely
Preceded by Air Vice Marshal Valston Hancock	Air Officer Commanding Operational Command; 1961–1962	Succeeded by Air Vice Marshal Alister Murdoch
