= No. 72 Wing RAAF =

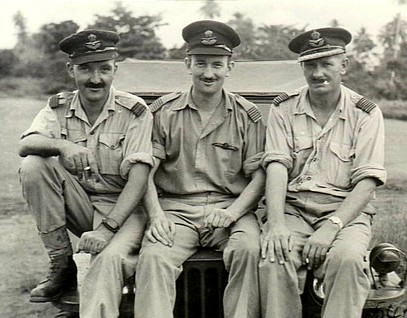
- Group Captain Allan Walters (right) with senior officers of No. 72 Wing in New Guinea, December 1943
- Active: 1943–45
- Country: Australia
- Branch: Royal Australian Air Force
- Role: Fighter; attack
- Size: Three flying squadrons
- Part of: North-Eastern Area Command
- Engagements: World War II: South West Pacific theatre

Commanders
- Notable commanders: Charles Eaton (1943); Allan Walters (1943–44); William Hely (1944)

Aircraft flown
- Attack: A-31 Vengeance
- Fighter: P-40 Kittyhawk; CAC Boomerang

No. 72 Wing was a Royal Australian Air Force (RAAF) wing that operated during World War II. It was formed in April 1943 at Townsville, Queensland, as part of North-Eastern Area Command. Led by Group Captain Charles Eaton, the wing soon deployed to Merauke, Dutch New Guinea, where it comprised three squadrons flying CAC Boomerang and P-40 Kittyhawk fighters, and A-31 Vengeance dive bombers. Eaton was succeeded by Group Captain Allan Walters in mid-1943. No. 72 Wing took part in the defence of Torres Strait, undertaking interception, patrol and occasional ground-attack and anti-shipping duties. By July 1944, its original squadrons had all been disbanded or transferred to other operational formations. No. 120 (Netherlands East Indies) Squadron, which had arrived in May 1944, operating Kittyhawks, remained at Merauke until February 1945. The wing headquarters returned to Australia that May, and disbanded the following month.

== History ==
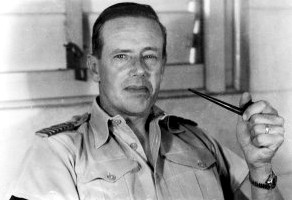
Group Captain Charles Eaton (pictured in 1941), inaugural commander of No. 72 Wing

No. 72 Wing was formed on 23 April 1943 at Townsville, Queensland, under the command of Group Captain Charles Eaton. Early the next month, its headquarters deployed to Merauke, described by the official history of the RAAF in World War II as "a desolate marshy little port in Dutch New Guinea". Controlling No. 84 Squadron (flying CAC Boomerang fighters), No. 86 Squadron (P-40 Kittyhawk fighters), and No. 12 Squadron (A-31 Vengeance dive bombers), the wing's purpose was to assist in the defence of Torres Strait.

The Boomerangs, operating out of Horn Island, undertook air defence and patrol tasks in and around western New Guinea, first making contact with enemy forces on 16 May 1943; they exchanged fire with three Japanese bombers, but the latter escaped into cloud. Merauke airfield was only completed in late June, and Nos. 86 and 12 Squadrons began arriving early the next month; by then the wing had also acquired No. 44 Operational Base Unit and its own medical receiving station and mobile fighter sector headquarters. Eaton's relations with North-Eastern Area Command in Townsville had meanwhile became strained. In his opinion, "the problems of Merauke were not understood from there ... mountains were made out of molehills", and he was posted that July to lead a bombing and gunnery establishment in South Australia. Later in the year he would form No. 79 Wing at Batchelor, Northern Territory.

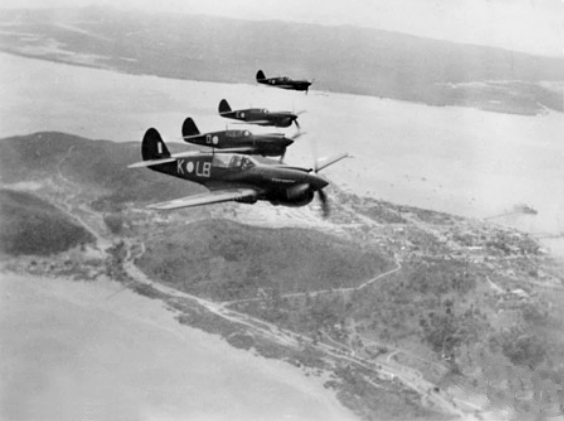
No. 84 Squadron Kittyhawks in formation over Thursday Island, Queensland, in 1943

Group Captain Allan Walters, formerly in charge of No. 1 (Fighter) Wing in Darwin, assumed command of No. 72 Wing following Eaton's reassignment. Enemy contact was generally sporadic and inconclusive, but on 9 September 1943 a force of over thirty Japanese bombers and escorting fighters heading for Merauke were intercepted by fourteen of No. 72 Wing's Kittyhawks and four of its Boomerangs; although most of the Kittyhawks' guns failed to fire through oil clogging, and none of the Boomerangs made contact, the Australian aircraft claimed one bomber and two fighters destroyed without loss. No. 12 Squadron became fully operational at Merauke in September, but was mainly given patrol duty and only rarely saw enemy activity. The following month, No. 84 Squadron converted to Kittyhawks and transferred to a new formation, No. 75 Wing, which controlled units on Horn Island, Thursday Island and Higgins Field. During late 1943 and early 1944, No. 86 Squadron was actively engaged in air defence, enjoying some success against Japanese bombers and their escorts, as well as participating in attacks on infrastructure and shipping in Dutch New Guinea.

No. 86 Squadron departed Merauke on 25 April 1944; the squadron was subsequently reduced to a cadre and its Kittyhawks transferred to Nos. 78 and 81 Wings of No. 10 Operational Group on Noemfoor Island. It was replaced by the Dutch-Australian No. 120 Squadron, which arrived from Canberra in early May and became operational on the 9th of the month. The same month, Walters handed over command of the wing to Group Captain Bill Hely. In July, No. 12 Squadron was withdrawn to Strathpine, Queensland, where it was reduced to cadre status ahead of converting to B-24 Liberator heavy bombers and eventually serving with another new formation, No. 85 Wing. Hely departed in September 1944 to establish an army cooperation formation, No. 84 Wing, at Cairns. Most of the RAAF units at Merauke were redeployed in late 1944 but No. 120 Squadron remained there until February 1945, when it was declared non-operational. The squadron returned to operational status and departed for eventual service at Biak in April that year. No. 72 Wing headquarters returned to Townsville in May 1945, disbanding on 20 June.
