= No. 90 Wing RAAF =

Royal Australian Air Force composite wing

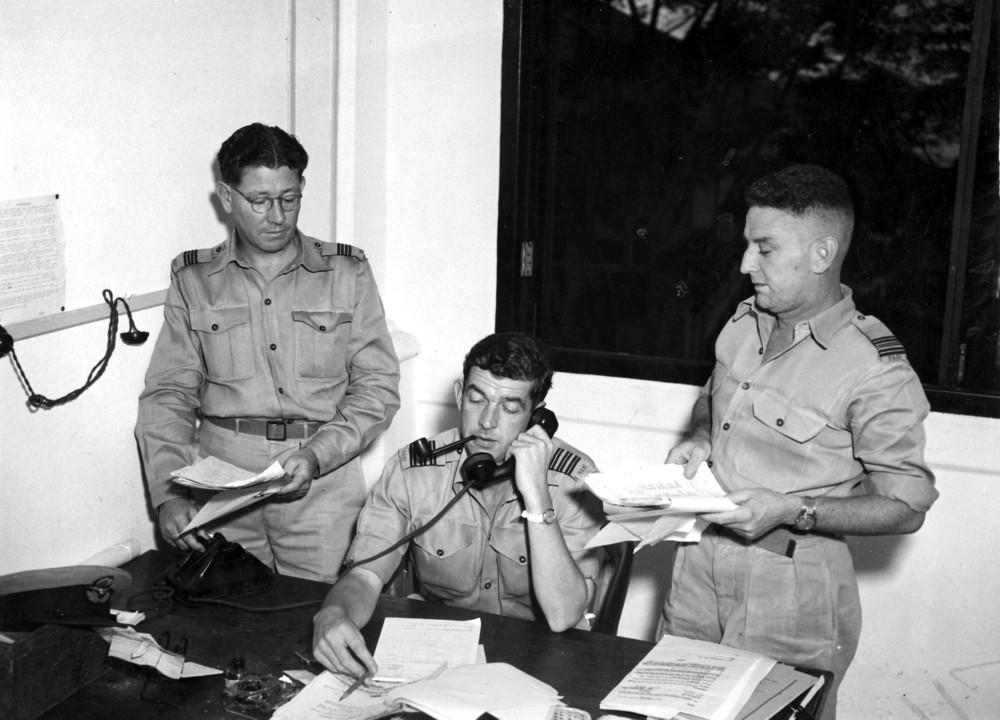
- RAAF officers at No. 90 Wing headquarters, Malaya, c. 1950
- Active: 1950–52
- Country: Australia
- Branch: Royal Australian Air Force
- Type: Composite wing
- Size: Two flying squadrons
- Headquarters: Changi, Singapore
- Engagements: Malayan Emergency

Commanders
- Notable commanders: Frank Headlam (1950–51)

Aircraft flown
- Bomber: Avro Lincoln
- Transport: C-47 Dakota

No. 90 (Composite) Wing was a Royal Australian Air Force (RAAF) wing that operated during the early years of the Malayan Emergency. Its purpose was to serve as an umbrella organisation for the RAAF units deployed in the conflict, No. 1 (Bomber) Squadron, flying Avro Lincolns, and No. 38 (Transport) Squadron, flying Douglas C-47 Dakotas. The wing was established in July 1950 and headquartered at Changi, on the east coast of Singapore. No. 1 Squadron operated from Tengah, in Singapore's west. No. 38 Squadron was based at Changi and, from April 1951 to February 1952, at Kuala Lumpur in central Malaya. The Lincolns generally conducted area bombing missions, as well as precision strikes, to harass communist insurgents. The Dakotas were tasked with airlifting cargo, VIPs, troops and casualties, as well as courier flights and supply drops. Following No. 38 Squadron's departure in December 1952, No. 90 Wing was disbanded, leaving No. 1 Squadron to carry on as the sole RAAF unit in the Malayan air campaign until its withdrawal to Australia in July 1958.

== History ==
=== Origins and formation ===
In April 1950, the British government requested Australia's assistance to combat communist insurgents during the Malayan Emergency. In response, the Australian Defence Committee determined that it was possible to commit a squadron of eight Douglas C-47 Dakota transports and a flight of four to six Avro Lincoln heavy bombers. The Federal government formally announced the decision to send the Dakotas soon afterwards; in late June, it confirmed the allocation of six Lincolns. No. 1 (Bomber) Squadron, operating the Lincolns, would be detached from the control of No. 82 Wing at RAAF Station Amberley, Queensland, and be based at Tengah airfield in the west of Singapore. No. 38 (Transport) Squadron, operating Dakotas, would be detached from No. 86 Wing at RAAF Station Richmond, New South Wales, and be based at Changi, in Singapore's east. The transport commitment was rendered possible by the recent return of ten Australian Dakota crews from service during the Berlin Airlift.

It was agreed that RAAF operations during the Emergency would be directed by the Royal Air Force (RAF) through Air Headquarters Malaya (later No. 224 Group RAF). The British also wanted the Australian squadrons attached to an RAF wing. The Chief of the Air Staff, Air Marshal George Jones, was mindful of repeating the experience of World War II, when RAAF units and personnel based in Britain had been absorbed by the RAF, rather than operating as a national group led by high-ranking Australian officers. He therefore decided that Nos. 1 and 38 Squadrons should be formed into a "composite" organisation (one made up of disparate elements such as bomber, fighter, or reconnaissance units) and administered by an overarching RAAF headquarters, and put this requirement to the British Air Ministry. The Air Ministry agreed, and No. 90 (Composite) Wing was duly established at Richmond on 10 July 1950, under the command of Group Captain Paddy Heffernan.

=== Operations ===
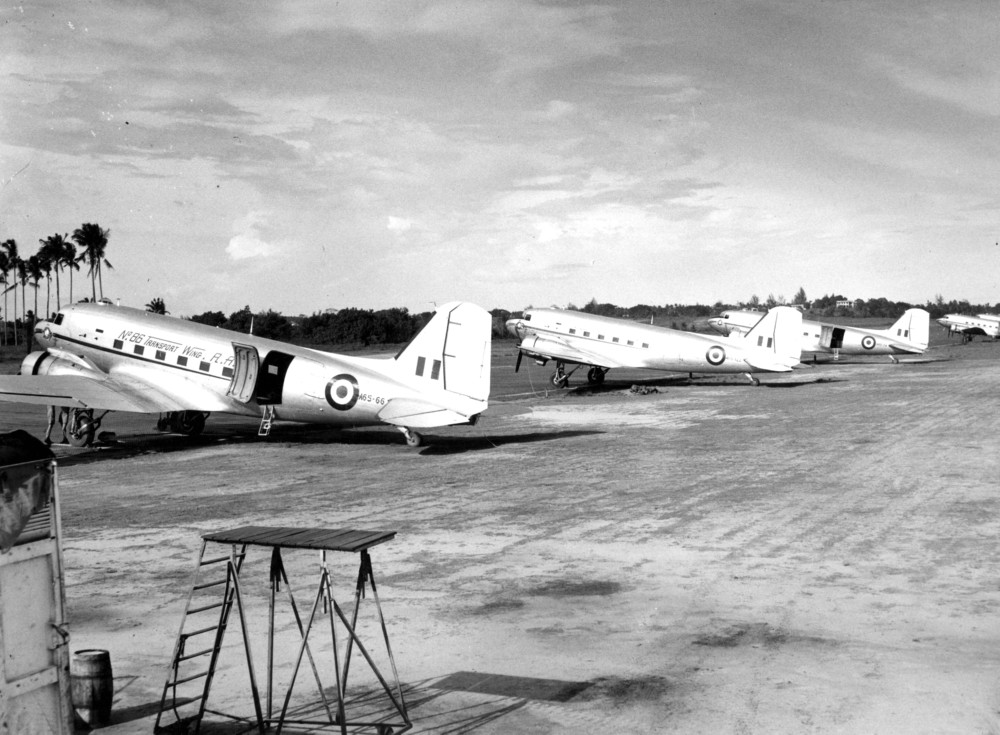
No. 38 Squadron Dakotas at RAF Changi in 1950

No. 38 Squadron's Dakotas began arriving at Changi on 19 June 1950, and No. 1 Squadron's Lincolns at Tengah on 16 July. No. 90 Wing staff departed Richmond by air and established the headquarters at Changi on 22 July. The Dakotas had flown their first mission the previous day; the Lincolns undertook their initial operations on 26 July. Nos. 1 and 38 Squadrons were responsible for their own routine maintenance; aircraft rotated back to Australia for major work. The RAF provided base support facilities, including messing and accommodation.

The Lincolns generally conducted area bombing missions, as well as strikes against pinpoint targets. They operated singly and in formations, sometimes in concert with RAF bombers. Not having to contend with anti-aircraft fire, the Lincolns flew mainly by day. After completing a bomb run, they would make another pass over the target to strafe with machine guns and 20 mm cannon. The Lincolns were considered well suited to the campaign, owing to their range and ability to fly at low speeds to search for targets, as well as their firepower and heavy bomb load. No. 1 Squadron also flew night missions—the only Commonwealth air force unit authorised to do so—of up to six hours duration, dropping one bomb every half hour or so. To reduce the risk of collateral damage, all air strikes had to be approved by the Joint Operation Centre, located at Kuala Lumpur in central Malaya and staffed by military, police and civilian personnel. Although the original purpose of the bombing campaign was to kill as many insurgents as possible, the impracticality of achieving this in operations over dense jungle resulted in a shift towards harassing and demoralising the communists, driving them out of their bases and into areas held by Commonwealth ground troops.

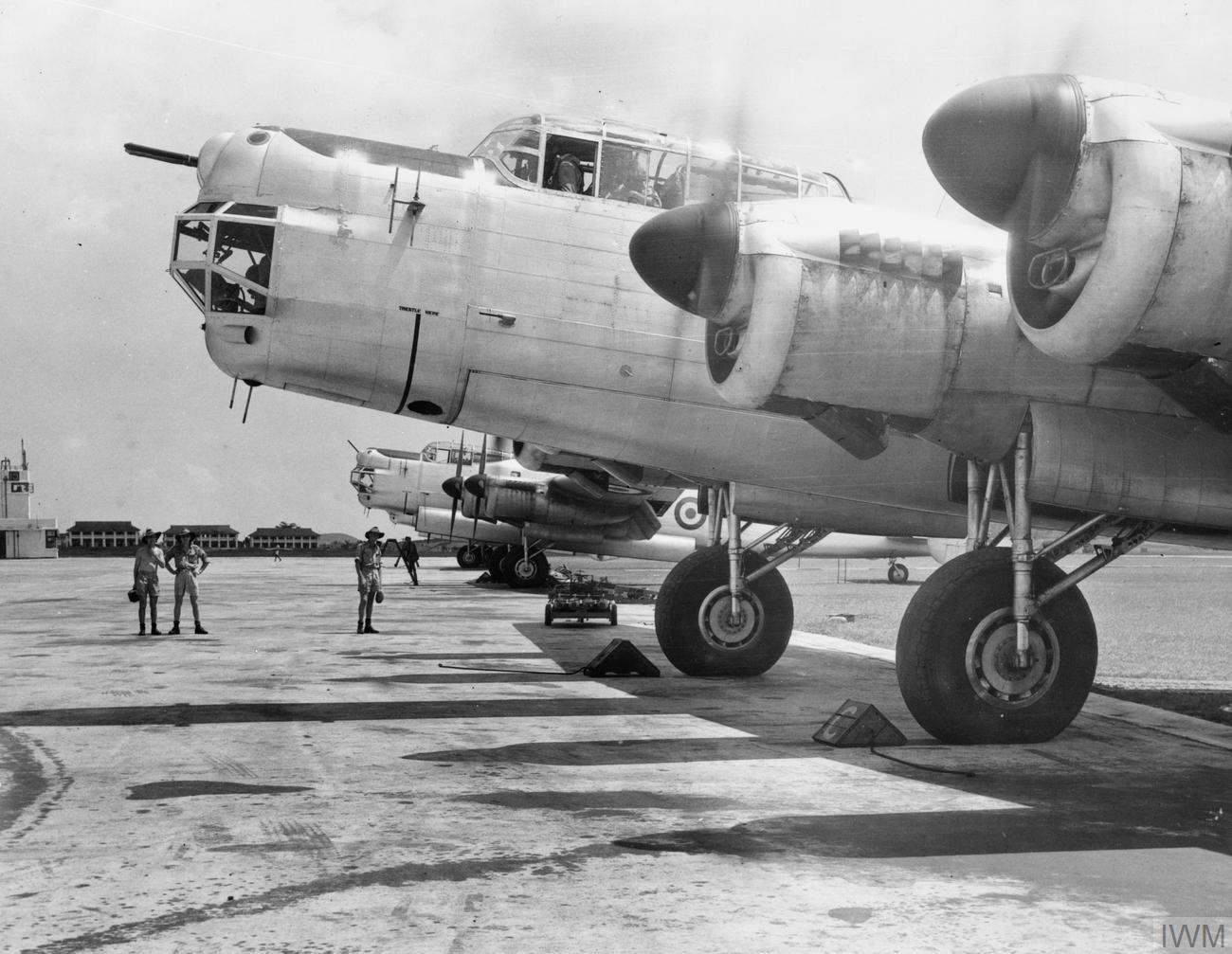
No. 1 Squadron Lincolns at RAF Tengah in 1950

The Dakotas were tasked with airlifting cargo, VIPs, troops and casualties, as well as courier flights, supply drops to friendly forces and aerial despatch of propaganda leaflets. On other missions they acted as pathfinders for No. 1 Squadron, dropping smoke canisters on suspected communist hideouts that the Lincolns flying above and behind would attempt to bomb. Airlifting and supplying troops was a key part of the strategy to defeat the insurgency, by ensuring that security forces could maintain a semi-permanent presence in the jungle. No. 38 Squadron's operations ranged throughout Malaya and into Borneo, the Philippines, Japan and Korea. Transport requirements in the Korean War led to a reduction in No. 90 Wing's strength when four of the Dakotas were transferred to Iwakuni, Japan, headquarters of No. 91 (Composite) Wing, in November 1950. The same month, Group Captain Frank Headlam was appointed to take over command of No. 90 Wing from Heffernan. Headlam co-piloted a Dakota on a supply drop on 20 December; he was slightly injured and the aircraft badly damaged following a crash-landing at Kampong Aur in Pahang as a result of engine failure.

No. 1 Squadron's complement was increased from six to eight aircraft after the British Air Ministry requested in February 1951 that Australia augment its bomber force to partly offset the imminent withdrawal of the RAF's Lincolns to Bomber Command in Europe. In April, No. 38 Squadron's four Dakotas relocated to Kuala Lumpur, where they undertook supply drops in cooperation with No. 41 Squadron RNZAF. One of No. 1 Squadron's Lincolns was written off after overshooting the runway at Tengah on 30 November. Wing Commander (later Group Captain) Redmond Green was appointed the new commanding officer of No. 90 Wing the following month, replacing Headlam. On 4 April 1952, Green participated in a Lincoln sortie in place of an injured pilot. The first aircraft he took off in had to turn back owing to engine failure. The second completed the mission but was found to have lost brake power as it was returning to Tengah, and there was a danger of the aircraft overrunning the landing strip and sustaining heavy damage; the crew was able to slow the Lincoln on the runway by trailing a parachute from the rear turret upon touching down.

=== Disbandment ===
No. 38 Squadron relocated from Kuala Lumpur to its former base at Changi in February 1952. As the year progressed, RAAF transport priorities altered owing to the increasing demands of the Korean War, and the Malayan commitment was no longer considered sustainable. Having airlifted more than 17,000 passengers and almost 1,900 tonnes of cargo, dropped some 750 tonnes of supplies and evacuated over 300 injured troops, No. 38 Squadron departed for Australia on 8 December and rejoined No. 86 Wing at Richmond three days later. Following this withdrawal, No. 90 Wing was disbanded at Changi, and No. 1 Squadron became the only Australian flying unit in Malaya. It continued the bombing campaign against the communists until it was withdrawn to Australia in July 1958, having flown almost 4,000 sorties in its eight years of operation and dropped over 14,000 tonnes of bombs—85 per cent of the total delivered by Commonwealth forces during the Emergency. No. 1 Squadron was relieved by No. 2 Squadron, operating English Electric Canberra jet bombers out of Butterworth in north-west Malaya.

== Commanding officers ==
No. 90 Wing was commanded by the following officers:

Appointed	Name
July 1950	Group Captain Paddy Hefferan
November 1950	Group Captain Frank Headlam
December 1951	Group Captain Redmond Green
