= Aitkenvale Aerodrome =

Royal Australian Air Force aerodrome in Queensland, Australia

Aitkenvale Aerodrome
- Townsville, Queensland in Australia

Site information
- Owner: Australian Air Board
- Operator: Royal Australian Air Force

Location
- Shown within Queensland Aitkenvale Aerodrome (Australia)
- Coordinates: 19°18′44.94″S 146°44′22.87″E

Site history
- Built: 1942
- In use: 1942 - 1945
- Battles/wars: Pacific War

Garrison information
- Occupants: No. 1 Reserve Personnel Pool RAAF; No. 24 Squadron RAAF; No. 84 Squadron RAAF

Airfield information
Runways
Direction	Length and surface
NE/SW	4,500 feet (1,372 m) gravel/bitumen

Aitkenvale Aerodrome was an aerodrome located 10 km (6 mi) southwest of Townsville, Queensland, Australia near Aitkenvale Weir on the banks of the Ross River. It was also known as Weir and Aitkenvale Weir. The aerodrome was constructed in 1942, during World War II, for the Royal Australian Air Force (RAAF) as part of a group of airfields to be used as aircraft dispersal fields in the event of Imperial Japanese attack on the Townsville area.

Located adjacent to the Weir State School, it became operational on 9 April 1942. Initially consisting of a 4,500 ft (1,372 m) gravel NE-SW runway, which was later sealed with bitumen.

It was abandoned after the war and has been redeveloped for housing.

Units

- No. 1 Reserve Personnel Pool RAAF
- No. 24 Squadron RAAF
- No. 84 Squadron RAAF
- No. 36 Squadron RAAF

== Aircraft crashes ==
- November 1943 – Curtiss P-40N Kittyhawk, Serial No. A29-498 (#42-104720)
- 19 June 1944 – P-40 Kittyhawk, Serial No. A29-704

== See also ==
- List of airports in Queensland
