= Bohle River Aerodrome =

- IATA: none; ICAO: none

Summary
- Location: Townsville, Queensland
- Built: 1942
- Coordinates: 19°16′58.08″S 146°41′57.33″E

Map
- Location in Queensland

Runways
Direction	Length		Surface
Direction	ft	m	Surface
1	5,580	1,701	bitumen sealed rolled sand

Bohle River Aerodrome was an aerodrome located 12.66 km (7.87 mi) west of Townsville, Queensland, Australia.

The aerodrome was constructed in 1942, during World War II, for the Royal Australian Air Force (RAAF) as part of a group of airfields to be used as aircraft dispersal fields in the event of Imperial Japanese attack on the Townsville area.

The aerodrome consisted of a bitumen sealed 5,580 ft × 150 ft (1,701 m × 46 m) NE-SW runway. A remote receiving station was constructed nearby.

It was utilised as a 1/4-mile drag strip until its closing on 25 August 2012, to make way for a new housing estate.

== Units based at Bohle River Aerodrome ==
- 40th Fighter Squadron of 35th Fighter Group – 20 April 1942
- No. 8 Squadron RAAF – 6 June 1943 – 15 September 1943
- No. 30 Squadron RAAF – 17 August 1942 – 14 September 1942
- No. 76 Squadron RAAF (P-40 Kittyhawk's) – 15 April 1942 until July 1942
- No. 86 Squadron RAAF – 13 May 1944 – 26 May 1944 & 10 January 1945 – 20 December 1945
- No. 100 Squadron RAAF – 22 September 1942 – 22 November 1942
- No. 5 Repair and Salvage Unit RAAF
- No. 11 Mobile Fighter Sector RAAF HQ – 11 December 1943 – 10 February 1944
- No. 22 Repair and Salvage Unit RAAF – 11 December 1943 – 10 February 1944
- No. 44 Operational Base Unit RAAF – February 1943 – April 1943

== See also ==
- List of airports in Queensland
