= William Hely =

Royal Australian Air Force senior commander

William Lloyd Hely
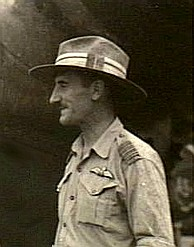
- Group Captain Bill Hely on Bougainville, January 1945
- Born: 24 August 1909; Wellington, New South Wales
- Died: 20 May 1970 (aged 60); Canberra
- Military career
- Allegiance: Australia
- Branch: Royal Australian Air Force
- Service years: 1927–66
- Rank: Air Vice Marshal
- Units: No. 3 Squadron (1936–37); RAAF Station Laverton (1938); North-Western Area Command (1942–43)
- Commands: North Australia Survey Flight (1936); No. 72 Wing (1944); No. 84 Wing (1944–45); Western Area Command (1951–53); Training Command (1956–57); Personnel Branch (1960–66)
- Conflicts: World War II; South West Pacific Theatre; New Guinea campaign; Bougainville campaign
- Awards: Companion of the Order of the Bath; Commander of the Order of the British Empire; Air Force Cross

Air Vice Marshal William Lloyd Hely, CB, CBE, AFC (24 August 1909 – 20 May 1970) was a senior commander in the Royal Australian Air Force (RAAF). He graduated from the Royal Military College, Duntroon, in 1930 before transferring to the RAAF as a cadet pilot. Hely came to public attention in 1936–37, first when he crashed on a survey flight in the Northern Territory, and later when he undertook two successful missions to locate missing aircraft in the same vicinity. His rescue efforts earned him the Air Force Cross. After occupying staff positions during the early years of World War II, Hely was appointed Officer Commanding No. 72 Wing in Dutch New Guinea in May 1944. Later that year he formed No. 84 (Army Cooperation) Wing, commanding it during the Bougainville campaign until the end of the Pacific War.

Hely spent the immediate post-war period on the staff of RAAF Headquarters, Melbourne. From 1951 to 1953 he served as Air Officer Commanding (AOC) Western Area Command in Perth, after which he was appointed a Commander of the Order of the British Empire. He was Deputy Chief of the Air Staff from 1953 to 1956, AOC Training Command from 1956 to 1957, and Head of the Australian Joint Services Staff in Washington, D.C. from 1957 to 1960. He then served as Air Member for Personnel (AMP) for six years, his tenure coinciding with a significant increase in manpower to meet commitments in South East Asia and the demands of a major re-equipment program. Having been promoted acting air vice marshal in 1953 (substantive in 1956), he was appointed a Companion of the Order of the Bath in 1964 for his service as AMP. He retired from the Air Force in 1966 and made his home in Canberra, where he died in 1970 at the age of sixty.

== Early career ==
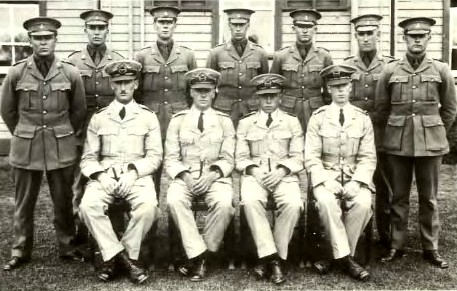
Pilot Officer Hely (seated, left) with fellow Duntroon ex-students who transferred to the RAAF in December 1930 including Bill Garing (standing, left), Douglas Candy (standing, centre) and Alister Murdoch (standing, right)

The third child of Prosper Frederick Hely, a storekeeper, and his wife Alice (née Lloyd), William Lloyd (Bill) Hely was born on 24 August 1909 at Wellington, New South Wales. He was educated to Intermediate Certificate level at Mudgee, Wollongong and Rozelle Public Schools, and at Fort Street High School, Petersham. Leaving school in 1926, he worked as a clerk and studied accountancy in his spare time. On 16 February 1927, Hely entered the Royal Military College, Duntroon, as one of four cadets sponsored that year by the Royal Australian Air Force (RAAF), which did not yet have its own officer training college. He graduated as a lieutenant on 9 December 1930, and the following day enlisted in the RAAF.

As well as the four graduates the Air Force had enrolled in 1927, budgetary constraints imposed during the Great Depression necessitated the transfer from Duntroon to Point Cook of eight other RAAF-sponsored cadets midway through their four-year course, including Alister Murdoch, Bill Garing and Douglas Candy. Initially ranked pilot officer, Hely commenced his flying training course at RAAF Point Cook, Victoria, on 15 January 1931, graduating on 10 December. His early postings as a pilot in 1932 and 1933 were to RAAF Station Richmond, New South Wales, and RAAF Station Laverton, Victoria. Qualifying in aerial photography, he served at Point Cook from 1933 to 1936. He was then transferred to No. 3 Squadron at Richmond, receiving promotion to flight lieutenant.

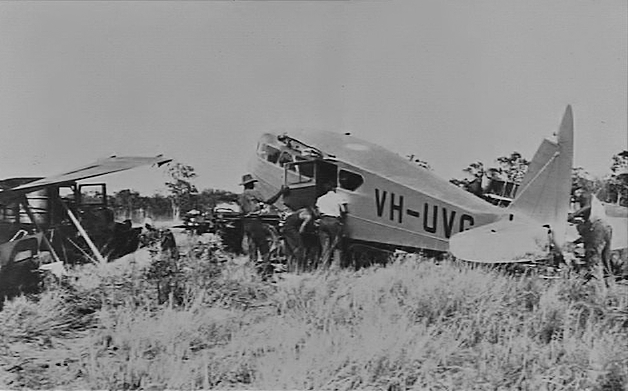
Flight Lieutenant Hely's Dragon Rapide that crash landed in the Northern Territory, 1936

In April 1936, Hely took command of No. 3 Squadron's North Australia Survey Flight, one of two such flights formed by the Air Force that month to carry out photographic surveys. Flying a twin-engined de Havilland Dragon Rapide (serial number A3-2), Hely departed Richmond on 11 April for Port Hedland, which was to be the flight's base for its initial survey work in Western Australia. Over the Northern Territory, between Newcastle Waters and Wave Hill, he became lost, ran out of fuel, and had to crash land. He and his crew of two were found by RAAF search aircraft ten days later, on 22 April. The Argus had reported that "grave fears" were held for their safety, but they were largely uninjured, Hely having suffered cuts and abrasions to his head and leg. The aircraft was badly damaged and had to be transported back to Richmond in pieces. In February 1937, Hely took part in the search for a missing Stinson airliner that was eventually found in the McPherson Range, Queensland, five of its seven passengers and crew dead.

For its 1937 aerial survey program, the RAAF formed the Communications and Survey Flight under No. 1 Aircraft Depot's Recruit Training Squadron at Laverton on 3 May. The flight was divided into Western and Eastern Air Detachments, the former under Hely. Flying a Tugan Gannet, Hely's first task became searching for survey director Sir Herbert Gepp, whose Rapide (A3-2, the same one Hely crash landed the previous year) had gone missing on an inspection flight in the Northern Territory between Tennant Creek and Tanimi. Hely located the downed Rapide on 23 May, guiding in a ground party that was able to clear a makeshift runway and allow Gepp and his team to take off and resume their journey. On 25 September, Hely was again diverted from survey work to search for a lost plane, this time the de Havilland Gipsy Moth of flying doctor Clyde Fenton, who had gone missing north-east of Newcastle Waters. Hely, once more piloting Rapide A3-2, found the Moth three days later and landed to rescue the lost doctor. Fenton was subsequently quoted as saying "I have only the highest praise for the efficient manner in which Hely conducted a difficult search and the skilful way in which he located me and picked me up." The rescue efforts made Hely one of the RAAF's best-known public figures. Completing his posting to the survey flight, he served as adjutant at Laverton in 1938. He was awarded the Air Force Cross on 9 June for "zeal and initiative in searching for Sir Herbert Gepp's party and later for Dr. Fenton when lost in Central Australia". On 29 November 1938, he married secretary Jean McDonald at St Aidan's Anglican Church in Launceston, Tasmania; the couple had two daughters. Hely spent the following year in Britain, attending the Royal Air Force Staff College, Andover, and was promoted to squadron leader in September.

== World War II ==
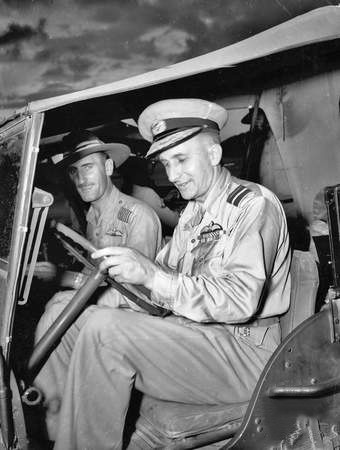
Group Captain Hely (left) as Officer Commanding No. 84 Wing, with the Chief of the Air Staff, Air Vice-Marshal George Jones, on Bougainville, in February 1945

At the outbreak of World War II, Hely was attached to the operations room at RAF Coastal Command. On his return to Australia in January 1940, he was appointed Staff Officer Plans at RAAF Headquarters, Melbourne. In October, he joined the Deputy Chief of the Air Staff, Air Vice Marshal Bill Bostock, as a delegate to a defence conference in Singapore. The Australian contingent found the local forces ill-prepared for an attack by the Japanese and recommended significant increases in air capability, both in Australia and in the Pacific Islands, to meet the threat. Hely was promoted to temporary wing commander the following January, and was the ranking Air Force delegate at a series of staff talks in Batavia and Singapore regarding the defence of the Dutch East Indies. He became Director of Operations at RAAF Headquarters in August. His promotion to acting group captain was announced on 17 February 1942. Two days later, the Japanese bombed Darwin, Northern Territory; Hely circulated a memo early the next month to all commands on the lessons learnt from the raid. He was posted to Darwin in May to join North-Western Area headquarters as senior air staff officer, and was granted the temporary rank of group captain in January 1943. Hely returned to RAAF Headquarters in March to become Director of Air Staff Plans.

In May 1944, Hely assumed command of No. 72 Wing at Merauke, Dutch New Guinea, succeeding Group Captain Allan Walters. Comprising fighter and dive-bomber squadrons, the wing had been established to undertake air defence and patrol tasks in and around western New Guinea. Hely departed Merauke in September 1944 to establish an army cooperation formation, No. 84 Wing, in Cairns, Queensland. It was one of two such wings formed by the RAAF in the South West Pacific Theatre late in World War II. They were, as described by the official history of the RAAF in the Pacific, "essentially non-offensive in character", responsible for reconnaissance, artillery spotting, supply drops to ground forces, spraying DDT to combat malaria, and guiding close support aircraft to their objectives. The wing could also carry out its own strikes on "targets of opportunity". No. 84 Wing comprised No. 5 (Tactical Reconnaissance) Squadron, No. 17 Air Observation Post Flight, No. 10 Communication Unit (subsequently renamed No. 10 Local Air Supply Unit), and No. 39 Operational Base Unit. It deployed to Torokina in October to support Australian troops during the Bougainville campaign. No. 5 Squadron, equipped with CAC Boomerangs and Wirraways, was assigned to mark targets for F4U Corsairs of the Royal New Zealand Air Force. Between December 1944 and January 1945, the wing lost one Auster, one Wirraway, and one Boomerang on operations. Despite shortages of pilots and equipment, Hely's formation was generally able to keep pace with the army's requirements. By the end of June 1945, it had flown over 4,000 sorties.

== Post-war career ==
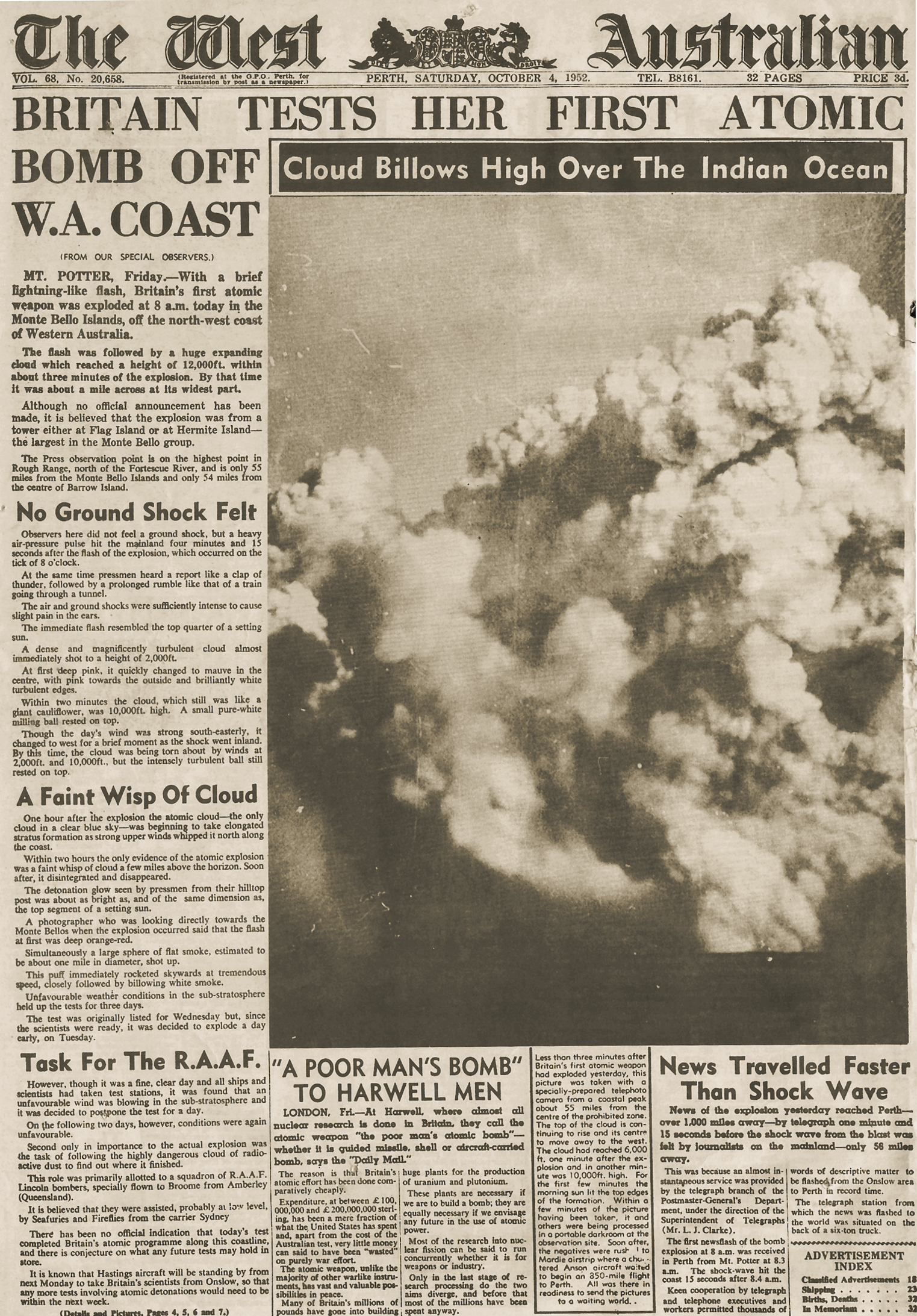
Air Commodore Hely coordinated RAAF support for the British atomic test at Montebello, Western Australia, in 1952

Hely relinquished command of No. 84 Wing on 12 August 1945 and returned to RAAF Headquarters in October. He was by this time among a coterie of officers at group captain level, including Val Hancock, Alister Murdoch and Bill Garing, earmarked by the Australian Air Board for leadership roles in the post-war RAAF, which was to shrink rapidly with demobilisation. At RAAF Headquarters, Hely was appointed deputy director of Operations, in which capacity he served on a committee to investigate proposals for an officer training college, later established as RAAF College, Point Cook. Along with Hely, all officers associated with the proposal's examination were former Duntroon students, including the Deputy Chief of the Air Staff, Air Commodore Frank Bladin, the Director of Postings, Group Captain Murdoch, and the Director of Training, Group Captain Paddy Heffernan. Another Duntroon graduate, Air Commodore Hancock, became the college's first commandant. Hely was appointed Director of Organisation and Staff Duties in 1946. That November, he became Director of Postings. The following year, he took up the position of Director of Personal Services, before departing for Britain in December 1948 to study at the Imperial Defence College, London.

Returning to Melbourne, Hely served as deputy to the Air Member for Personnel from January 1950. He became an aide-de-camp to King George VI in June 1951. In September, he was appointed Officer Commanding Western Area, Perth, taking up his new post in mid-October. He was promoted to acting air commodore in July 1952, becoming Air Officer Commanding (AOC) Western Area. His rank was made permanent in September, and the same month he was appointed aide-de-camp to Queen Elizabeth II. Among Hely's duties as AOC Western Area was coordinating air support for the British atomic test on Montebello in October 1952, including supply and observation flights by Dakotas of No. 86 (Transport) Wing. He was appointed a Commander of the Order of the British Empire (CBE) in the Queen's Coronation Honours promulgated on 1 June 1953, for his war service and his work during the Montebello test. In August, he was named Deputy Chief of the Air Staff (DCAS), with the acting rank of air vice marshal, effective from October; he replaced Air Vice Marshal Hancock.

Between October 1953 and February 1954, the RAAF underwent major organisational change, as it transitioned from a geographically based command-and-control system to one based on function, resulting in the establishment of Home (operational), Training, and Maintenance Commands. At the same time, RAAF Headquarters in Melbourne was absorbed by the Department of Air in Canberra. Hely was acting Air Member for Personnel from 3 January to 7 March 1955, between the terms of Air Vice Marshals Val Hancock and Fred Scherger. On 24 January 1956, he became AOC Training Command, taking over from Air Vice Marshal Murdoch. He was succeeded as DCAS by Air Vice Marshal Douglas Candy. Hely's rank of air vice marshal became substantive on 5 September. In January 1957, Point Cook retired its last de Havilland Tiger Moth trainers, signalling the end of the biplane era in the RAAF. That May, Hely was seconded to the Department of Defence and posted to Washington, D.C., to head up the Australian Joint Services Staff. He was succeeded as AOC Training Command by Air Vice Marshal Ian McLachlan.

Air Vice Marshal Hely as Air Member for Personnel

Hely became Air Member for Personnel (AMP) on 28 March 1960, taking over from the acting AMP, Air Commodore Frank Headlam. Responsible for the Personnel Branch of the RAAF, the position of AMP occupied a seat on the Air Board, the service's controlling body that comprised its senior officers and was chaired by the Chief of the Air Staff (CAS). The Air Force expanded greatly during Hely's term as AMP, owing to Australia's increasing commitment to the security of South East Asia, and the most significant rearmament program the RAAF had undertaken outside of World War II. Its permanent establishment increased from a steady 15,000 or so in the 1950s to over 18,000 by 1966. Hely himself initiated a scheme to attract staff from the Royal Air Force, which was suffering cutbacks, by opening a recruitment office in London and taking advantage of the Australian government's assisted passage scheme to import trained personnel and their families. He was appointed a Companion of the Order of the Bath (CB) in the 1964 New Year Honours for his "tactful and careful handling of personnel matters", and for having "done much to improve the manning level of the Air Force". As AMP, Hely put forward proposals to increase the number of diploma-qualified engineering and equipment officers in the Air Force. He was also closely involved in deliberations concerning the balance of academic and military studies at the RAAF Academy (previously RAAF College), the outcome of which is considered to have left the course biased towards pure science, rather than its applications to air power.

== Retirement ==
Hely retired on 24 August 1966, after almost forty years in the military. He was succeeded the following day as AMP by Air Vice Marshal Candy. In retirement, Hely was active in the Canberra branch of the Air Force Association. He died of cancer in Canberra on 20 May 1970. Survived by his wife and children, he was accorded an Air Force funeral at St John the Baptist Church and cremated at Norwood Park Crematorium, Gungahlin. The official mourning party included Chairman of the Chiefs of Staff Committee (CCOSC) General Sir John Wilton, former CCOSC Air Chief Marshal Sir Frederick Scherger, Secretary of Defence Sir Arthur Tange, CAS Air Marshal Colin Hannah, former CAS Air Marshal Sir Alister Murdoch, Vice Admiral Sir Victor Smith, Air Vice Marshal Brian Eaton, and Group Captain John Waddy. The guns at Duntroon were fired in salute as the cortege left the church.

== Notes ==
Military offices
Preceded by Air Vice Marshal Valston Hancock	Deputy Chief of the Air Staff; 1953–1955	Succeeded by Air Vice Marshal Douglas Candy
Preceded by Air Vice Marshal Valston Hancock	Air Member for Personnel (Acting); 1955	Succeeded by Air Vice Marshal Frederick Scherger
Preceded by Air Vice Marshal Alister Murdoch	Air Officer Commanding Training Command; 1956–1957	Succeeded by Air Vice Marshal Ian McLachlan
Preceded by Air Commodore Frank Headlam	Air Member for Personnel; 1960–1966	Succeeded by Air Vice Marshal Douglas Candy
