= Valston Hancock =

Royal Australian Air Force chief

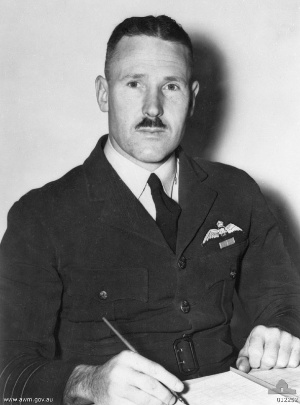
- Group Captain Val Hancock, 1942
- Born: 31 May 1907; Perth, Western Australia, Australia
- Died: 29 September 1998 (aged 91); Perth, Western Australia, Australia
- Relatives: Lang Hancock (cousin)
- Military career
- Allegiance: Australia
- Branch: Australian Army; Royal Australian Air Force
- Service years: 1925–65
- Rank: Air Marshal
- Units: RAAF Command (1942–43); Western Area Command (1943–44)
- Commands: No. 1 BAGS (1940–41); No. 100 Squadron (1945); No. 71 Wing (1945); RAAF College (1947–49); No. 224 Group RAF (1957–59); Operational Command (1959–61); Chief of the Air Staff (1961–65)
- Conflicts: World War II; South West Pacific theatre; Aitape–Wewak campaign; Malayan Emergency; Indonesia–Malaysia confrontation; Vietnam War
- Awards: Knight Commander of the Order of the British Empire; Companion of the Order of the Bath; Distinguished Flying Cross
- Other work: Co-founder, Australia Defence Association

Air Marshal Sir Valston Eldridge Hancock, KBE, CB, DFC (31 May 1907 – 29 September 1998) was a senior commander in the Royal Australian Air Force (RAAF). He served as Chief of the Air Staff from 1961 to 1965. A graduate of the Royal Military College, Duntroon, Hancock transferred from the Army to the RAAF in 1929 and qualified as a pilot. His administrative training at Duntroon saw him mainly occupy staff posts, including Deputy Director of Operations and Intelligence at RAAF Headquarters from 1931 to 1935, and Director of Works and Buildings from 1937 to 1939. During the early years of World War II, he commanded No. 1 Bombing and Gunnery School, and held senior planning and administrative positions. He eventually saw combat in the Aitape–Wewak campaign of the Pacific War during 1945. Flying Bristol Beaufort light bombers, he led first No. 100 Squadron, and later No. 71 Wing. His actions earned him the Distinguished Flying Cross.

After the war, Hancock became the inaugural commandant of RAAF College. His subsequent positions included Deputy Chief of the Air Staff from 1951 to 1953, Air Member for Personnel from 1953 to 1955, and Air Officer Commanding (AOC) No. 224 Group RAF in Malaya, responsible for all Commonwealth air forces in the region, from 1957 to 1959. Appointed a Companion of the Order of the Bath in 1958, he served as AOC RAAF Operational Command from 1959 to 1961, before being promoted to air marshal and commencing his term as Chief of the Air Staff. He was knighted in 1962. In his role as the Air Force's senior officer, Hancock initiated redevelopment of RAAF Base Learmonth in north Western Australia, as part of a chain of forward airfields for the defence of the continent. He also evaluated potential replacements for the RAAF's English Electric Canberra bomber, finding the American "TFX" (later the General Dynamics F-111) to be the most suitable for Australia's needs, though he did not recommend its immediate purchase due to its early stage of development. After retiring from the military in May 1965, Hancock co-founded the Australia Defence Association. He died in 1998, aged 91.

== Early career ==
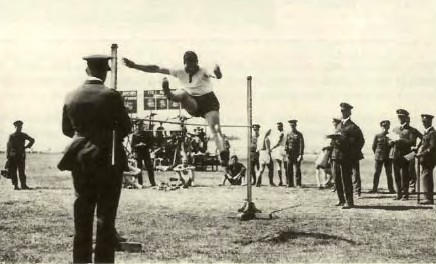
Hancock competing in the high jump at an RAAF sports carnival in the early 1930s

Valston Eldridge Hancock was born on 31 May 1907 in Perth, Western Australia, and educated at Hale School in Wembley Downs. He was the elder cousin of future mining magnate Lang Hancock. Val Hancock entered the Royal Military College, Duntroon, as a cadet on 18 February 1925. Rising to battalion sergeant-major as a senior cadet, Hancock graduated as a lieutenant on 12 December 1928, earning the Sword of Honour. His preferred career path in the military was engineering, and it was only when he found there was no vacancy in his corps of choice, and that he had instead been earmarked for the artillery, that he put his name forward for transfer to the Royal Australian Air Force (RAAF). On 1 February 1929, Hancock was seconded to the RAAF as a temporary pilot officer. He undertook flying instruction at RAAF Point Cook, Victoria, and was promoted flying officer on 1 July 1930. In September 1931, Hancock's transfer to the RAAF was retroactively approved with effect from 1 February 1929.

Hancock's initial postings after qualifying as a pilot were to Nos. 1 and 3 Squadrons. It was common practice for Duntroon graduates to be given positions in the Air Force because of their training in administration, and Hancock spent most of the 1930s in a succession of posts at RAAF Headquarters in Melbourne. From 1931 to 1935, he served as Deputy Director of Operations and Intelligence, with promotion to flight lieutenant on 1 July 1934. He married Joan Butler on 26 May 1932; the couple had two sons and a daughter. By 1935, Hancock had been appointed Staff Officer to the Chief of the Air Staff. In 1937 he was posted to Britain to attend the RAF Staff College, Andover. Like other Commonwealth air forces, the RAAF maintained close technological and educational ties with the Royal Air Force, and Hancock was one of thirty Australian officers to pass through Andover before the outbreak of World War II. Returning to Australia in 1938, he became Director of Works and Buildings, commonly known as "Works and Bricks", at RAAF Headquarters, and was promoted to squadron leader on 1 March 1939.

== World War II ==
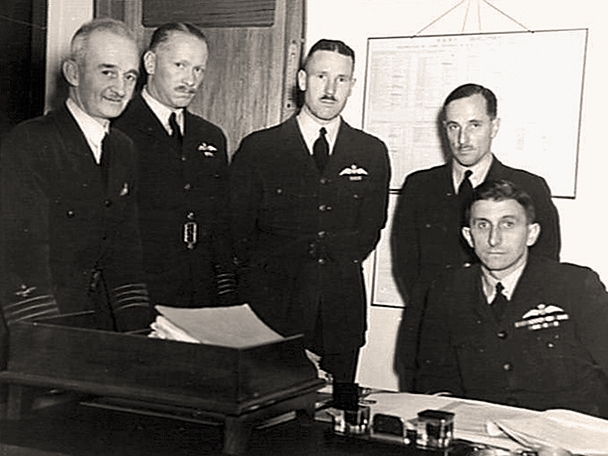
Group Captains Hancock (centre) and Walters (second left), Air Commodore Hewitt (second right), and Chief of the Air Staff, AVM Jones (right), 1942

In March 1940, Hancock's Directorate of Works and Buildings was transferred from the office of the Chief of the Air Staff to the newly formed Organisation and Equipment Branch under Air Marshal Richard Williams. Considered a key part of the Air Force's expansion during the early part of the War, "Works and Bricks" quickly absorbed all staff with civil engineering and building experience in the RAAF active reserve. As Director, Hancock was responsible for surveying and developing a military aerodrome at Evans Head, near the Queensland and New South Wales border, that became home to No. 1 Bombing and Gunnery School (No. 1 BAGS). Promoted to temporary wing commander on 1 June, he held command of No. 1 BAGS, operating Fairey Battle single-engined bombers, from August 1940 until November 1941. He was promoted to acting group captain on 1 April 1941. Hancock was appointed an Officer of the Order of the British Empire (OBE) on 1 January 1942. He relinquished his acting rank on 12 January, and became Assistant Director of Plans at Allied Air Forces Headquarters, South West Pacific Area that April. He was made Director of Plans at the Air Force's main operational formation, RAAF Command, when it was established in September. In 1943–44, he served as Staff Officer Administration for Western Area Command, which maintained two bomber squadrons for anti-submarine patrols and two fighter squadrons to guard against possible attack on the mainland by Japanese carrier-borne aircraft.

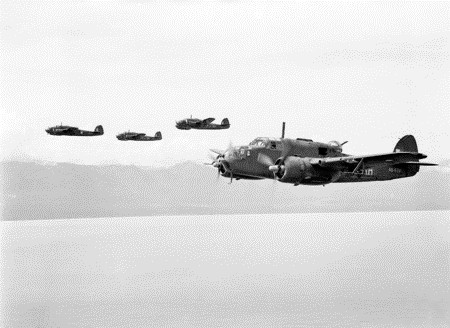
No. 100 Squadron Beauforts near Wewak, 1945

Hancock finally gained a combat command in January 1945, when he took charge of No. 100 Squadron, flying Bristol Beaufort light bombers during the Aitape-Wewak campaign in New Guinea. That month, the unit attacked Japanese positions at Maprik, below the Prince Alexander Ranges, and Cape Moem, near Wewak. On 1 April, Hancock took over No. 71 Wing, which came under overall control of RAAF Northern Command and nominally comprised Nos. 7, 8 and 100 Beaufort Squadrons, as well as a flight of CAC Boomerang fighter-bombers from No. 4 (Army Cooperation) Squadron. It was soon augmented by two more Beaufort units, Nos. 6 and 15 Squadrons. Providing close air support to Australian ground troops in the lead-up to the final assault on Wewak, the wing flew over 1,400 sorties and dropped more than 1,200 tons of bombs in May alone. By mid-year, Hancock's forces were acutely short of fuel and ordnance, to the extent that his squadrons took to arming their Beauforts with captured Japanese bombs. In July, enough supplies arrived to enable the wing to continue operating at normal strength. No. 71 Wing was active to the last day of the Pacific War, flying its final combat mission involving thirty Beauforts only hours before news of victory arrived on 15 August 1945. Hancock's "distinguished flying on operations in Northern Command" earned him the Distinguished Flying Cross; the award was published in the London Gazette on 22 February 1946.

== Post-war career ==
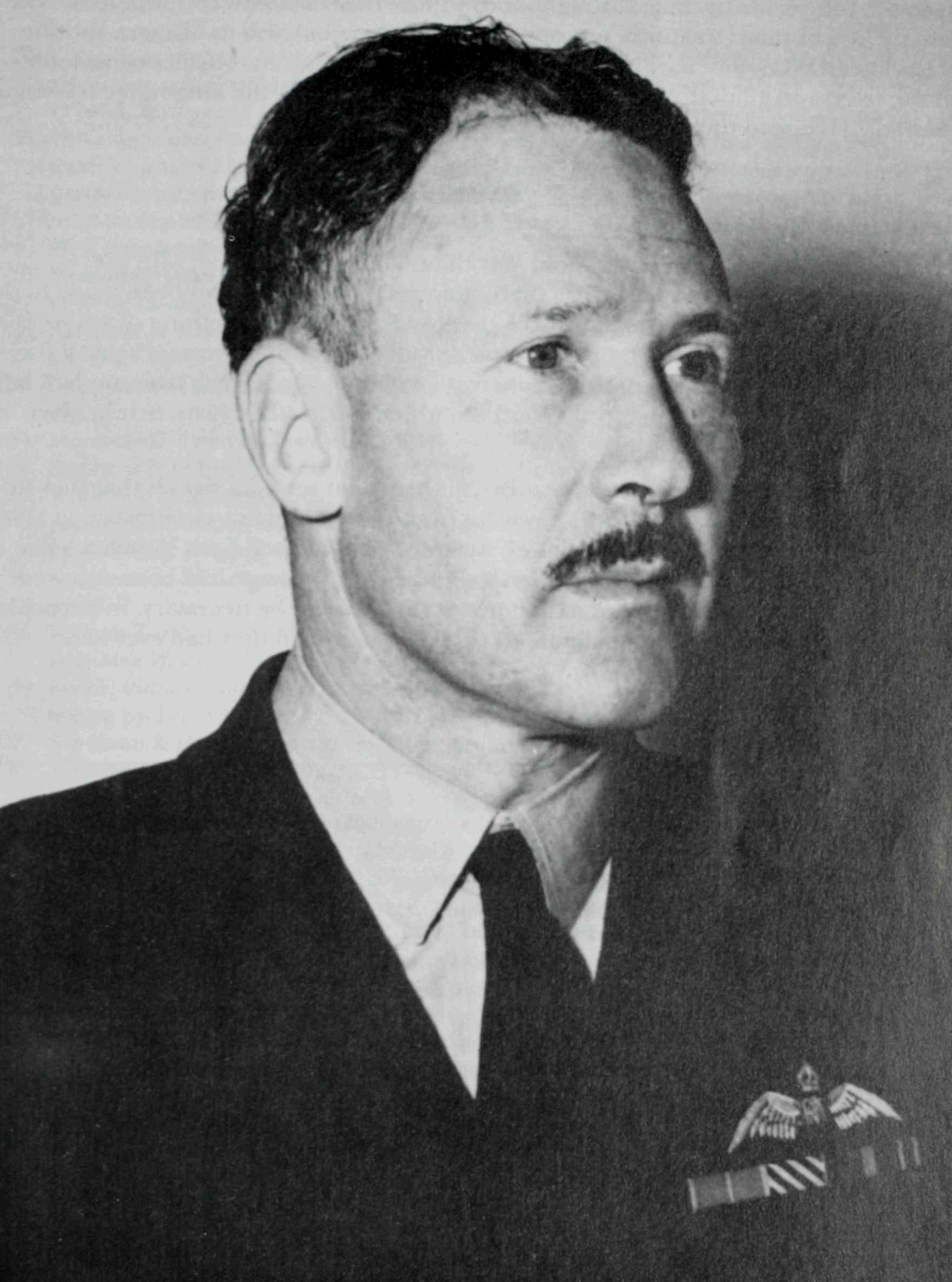
Air Commodore Hancock as inaugural commandant of RAAF College, Point Cook, c. 1948

Among a small coterie of wartime RAAF commanders considered suitable for future senior roles, Hancock retained his rank of group captain following the end of hostilities. As Director of Personnel Services during 1946, he was involved in restructuring the Air Force into a dramatically smaller peacetime service. He recalled it as a "twilight period" when "no-one wanted to know about us" and many good people were let go due to the government's parsimonious retention policies. On 1 January 1947, Hancock was promoted to substantive group captain. Receiving a further promotion to temporary air commodore on 1 March, he was appointed inaugural commandant of the newly formed RAAF College, Point Cook, the Air Force's equivalent of Duntroon and the Royal Australian Naval College. He also drafted the institution's charter. Departing in late 1949, he spent the following year in Britain, where he attended the Imperial Defence College, receiving a promotion to substantive air commodore on 1 February 1950. On his return to Australia in 1951, he was promoted to acting air vice-marshal and made Deputy Chief of the Air Staff on 21 June. He was raised to a Commander of the Order of the British Empire (CBE) in the 1953 New Years Honours. On 16 October that year, Hancock took over from Air Vice-Marshal Frank Bladin as Air Member for Personnel (AMP), and was promoted substantive air vice-marshal on 1 January 1954. As AMP, he occupied a seat on the Air Board, the service's controlling body that consisted of its most senior officers and which was chaired by the Chief of the Air Staff. Completing his term on 3 January 1955, Hancock was posted to Britain as Head of the Australian Joint Services Staff in London. He spent much of the latter half of 1955 and early 1956 laid low by a stomach ailment that was initially diagnosed as amoebic dysentery but later thought to be Malta fever or malaria.

In March 1957, Hancock was one of three candidates, along with Air Vice-Marshals Frederick Scherger and Allan Walters, touted as possible successors to Air Marshal Sir John McCauley as Chief of the Air Staff (CAS), the RAAF's senior position. Scherger gained selection, and Hancock was posted in June to Malaya as Air Officer Commanding (AOC) No. 224 Group RAF, responsible for all Commonwealth air forces in the region. According to the official post-war history of the RAAF, though fastidious in appearance and a strict teetotaller, Hancock was known for his enthusiasm in meeting staff and as "an indefatigable participant in mess functions and games". He also made a point of getting out to units in the field, taking every opportunity to fly himself around his command. For his "distinguished service in Malaya", Hancock was appointed a Companion of the Order of the Bath (CB) on 9 December 1958. He returned to Australia in July 1959 to serve as AOC Operational Command (now Air Command). When Scherger's term as CAS was due to complete, Hancock and Walters were once more put forward to the Minister for Air as potential replacements. His "professional ability, operational experience and personal qualities" being deemed more appropriate for the role, Hancock was promoted to air marshal and took over as CAS on 29 May 1961. In June, he met with his opposite numbers in the Army and Navy at a Chiefs of Staff Committee conference to discuss the necessity of Australia's acquiring nuclear weapons; the chiefs agreed that the probability such a capability would be required was remote but that it should remain an option under certain circumstances, a position the defence forces maintained during the ensuing decade. He was appointed a Knight Commander of the Order of the British Empire (KBE) in the 1962 Queen's Birthday Honours, gazetted on 2 June.

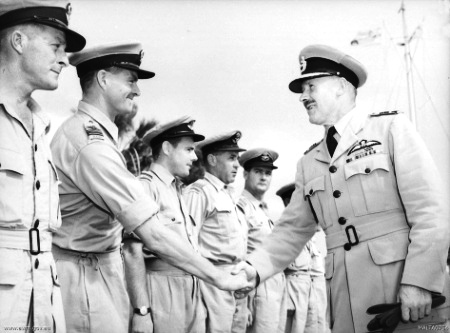
Air Vice-Marshal Hancock (right) greeting personnel of No. 78 Wing in Malta, where the unit was on garrison duty, August 1953

As CAS, Hancock worked to enhance the RAAF's deterrent capability in the Pacific region, particularly in light of heightened tensions with Indonesia during its period of Konfrontasi with Malaysia. In June 1963, Hancock undertook a mission to Britain, France and the United States to consider potential replacements for the English Electric Canberra bomber as Australia's prime aerial strike platform. After investigating the US "TFX", North American A-5 Vigilante and McDonnell Douglas F-4 Phantom II, the British BAC TSR-2, and the French Dassault Mirage IV, Hancock decided the swing-wing TFX, forerunner of the General Dynamics F-111, would be the aircraft best suited for this role. As the TFX had not yet flown, he recommended purchase of the already operational Vigilante to counteract a perceived imminent threat from Indonesia. In the event, the Federal Government did not go ahead with an immediate replacement for the Canberra, and Hancock's original choice of the TFX was taken up as a long-term solution, leading to Australia's agreement in October to purchase the F-111C. The same month, as Konfrontasi continued to simmer, Hancock approved simplification to the rules of engagement for Australian CAC Sabre fighters based at RAAF Butterworth to engage and destroy Indonesian aircraft violating Malay air space. The following month he urged using RAAF Canberras from Butterworth to make pre-emptive strikes against Indonesian air bases, in retaliation for incursions into West Malaysia, but Britain, which had initially requested Australia's involvement, held back on action.

Once the F-111 had been ordered, Hancock sought a suitable forward airfield from which they could operate. In this, he continued a policy initiated by his predecessor as CAS, Air Marshal Scherger, of developing a chain of so-called "bare bases" in Northern Australia. Hancock recommended redeveloping RAAF Base Learmonth in the northern part of Western Australia, due to its proximity to Indonesia. Flying out of this airfield, the F-111s could destroy "vital centres in Java"; just as importantly for deterrence purposes, Hancock contended, enhancing the base's capability would send a clear message to Indonesia's hierarchy. Though the project was delayed, in part due to thawing in relations between Australia and Indonesia, Learmonth's upgrade was completed in 1973, the same year the F-111 finally entered RAAF service. The latter part of Hancock's tour as CAS coincided with the beginning of large-scale Australian involvement in the Vietnam War. By mid-1964, the Commonwealth had already sent a small team of military advisors, plus a detachment of newly acquired DHC-4 Caribou cargo planes, to the region at the request of the South Vietnamese government. Under Hancock, the Caribou had itself only been reluctantly ordered by the Air Force following intense pressure from the Army and the Federal government for a STOL transport. Concerned at the potential drain on the RAAF's resources, Hancock tried to resist calls for commitments to Vietnam. His negative views were in contrast to the hawkish attitudes of his deputy, Air Vice-Marshal Colin Hannah, and Air Chief Marshal Scherger, now Chairman of the Chiefs of Staff Committee and Australia's senior soldier. In April 1965, as part of American operations in Indochina, United States Air Force strike aircraft took up residence at Ubon Air Force Base, Thailand, which since 1962 had been home to No. 79 Squadron Sabres and run by the RAAF under SEATO arrangements. Hancock proposed that Australia continue to command the facility and provide local air defence, though this effectively made the Sabres a support unit in the war effort and therefore potential targets of North Vietnamese attack; as it happened, none occurred.

== Later life ==
Hancock retired from the Air Force in May 1965 after completing his term as CAS, which the government had extended for twelve months beyond its original three years. Having followed two fellow Royal Military College graduates (McCauley and Scherger) in the role, he was succeeded by another former Duntroon cadet, Alister Murdoch. Hancock's name was put forward as a successor to Scherger when the latter's term as Chairman of the Chiefs of Staff Committee completed in May 1966, but Prime Minister Sir Robert Menzies preferred General Sir John Wilton for the position. Later the same year, Hancock took over as Commissioner-General for Australia at Expo 67 in Montreal, Canada, following the sudden death of the previous appointee, Vice Admiral Sir Hastings Harrington. In 1975, prompted in part by the fall of Saigon in April that year, Hancock co-founded the Australia Defence Association as an independent think tank for defence matters, and chaired its Western Australian chapter. He was also active in the Royal Commonwealth Society, and published an autobiography, Challenge, in 1990. Hancock continued to fly in retirement, joining his cousin Lang, also a pilot, in promoting the Pilbara mining district. Val Hancock died in Perth on 29 September 1998, and was survived by his wife and three children. He is commemorated by Sir Valston Hancock Drive at Evans Head, New South Wales.

== Notes ==
Military offices
Preceded by Air Vice-Marshal Frederick Scherger	Deputy Chief of the Air Staff; 1951–1952	Succeeded by Air Vice-Marshal William Hely
Preceded by Air Vice-Marshal Frank Bladin	Air Member for Personnel; 1953–1955	Succeeded by Air Vice-Marshal William Hely
Preceded by Air Marshal Sir Frederick Scherger	Chief of the Air Staff; 1961–1965	Succeeded by Air Marshal Sir Alister Murdoch
