= No. 84 Squadron RAAF =

Royal Australian Air Force squadron

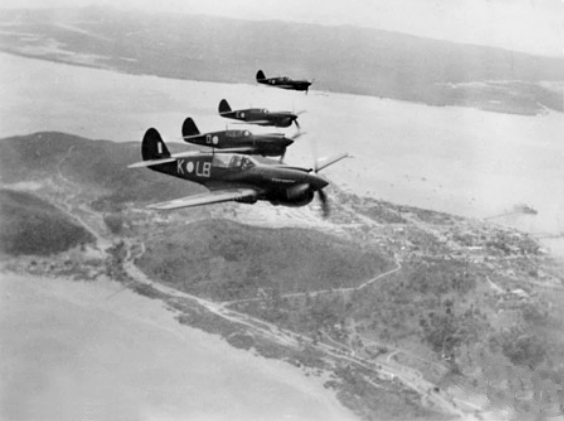
- No. 84 Squadron Kittyhawks over Thursday Island in 1943
- Active: 1943–1946
- Country: Australia
- Branch: Royal Australian Air Force
- Role: Fighter
- Engagements: World War II

Insignia
- Squadron code: LB

Aircraft flown
- Fighter: CAC Boomerang; Curtiss P-40 Kittyhawk; CAC Mustang

No. 84 Squadron was a Royal Australian Air Force (RAAF) fighter squadron of World War II. It was established in February 1943 and was part of the defences of the Torres Strait area from April 1943 until May the next year. After being withdrawn from the Torres Strait the squadron was reduced to a cadre until May 1945, when it began to receive new aircraft. No. 84 Squadron was disbanded in January 1946.

== History ==
No. 84 Squadron was formed at RAAF Station Richmond, New South Wales, on 5 February 1943. It was selected as the first operational squadron to be equipped with Australian-designed CAC Boomerang fighters in March, but did not take delivery of any of these aircraft at the time. During late March the squadron moved to Horn Island in the Torres Strait via Cairns; its main party arrived on 1 April and the rear party disembarked on 1 May. No. 84 Squadron's first ten Boomerangs arrived at Horn Island on 4 April, and the squadron was declared operational that day. More Boomerangs arrived on 15 April, and by 1 May the squadron had a strength of 20 Boomerangs, 23 officers and 275 other ranks.

In early 1943 the Allied leadership believed that Japanese forces could attack the Torres Strait area, and No. 84 Squadron's role was to provide air defence of the region. It initially operated alongside the Bristol Beaufort-equipped No. 7 Squadron, which conducted anti-submarine patrols to protect Allied shipping. From late April the squadron came under the command of No. 72 Wing, which was headquartered in the strategically located town of Merauke on the south coast of Dutch New Guinea. From early May, No. 84 Squadron regularly conducted patrols of the Merauke area, and it maintained a standing patrol over the town from the 8th of the month. However, due to the short range of the Boomerangs they could only remain over Merauke for an hour at a time. No. 84 Squadron first saw combat on 16 May, when a patrol of two Boomerangs intercepted three Mitsubishi G4M "Betty" bombers near Merauke. The guns of one of the fighters jammed, and the other did not score any hits during the brief engagement, which ended when the bombers escaped into clouds.

In late June an airfield was completed at Merauke, and the Curtiss P-40 Kittyhawk fighter-equipped No. 86 Squadron was based there from 2 July. No. 84 Squadron also established a detachment at the airfield. On 30 August, the main body of the squadron unsuccessfully attempted to intercept a force of Japanese aircraft operating near Horn Island. On 9 September, four No. 84 Squadron Boomerangs and 14 No. 86 Squadron Kittyhawks were scrambled from Merauke to intercept an incoming force of Japanese aircraft which were flying at 20,000 feet (6,100 m). The Kittyhawks made contact with the raiders before they reached Merauke and shot down two Japanese fighters without loss. The Japanese bombers destroyed a No. 84 Squadron Boomerang on the ground, and the four aircraft that had taken off were unable to make contact with the enemy. The Boomerang destroyed on 9 September was No. 84 Squadron's only combat loss of the war.

By September 1943 the RAAF had concluded that Boomerangs were not suited to the interceptor role, and it was decided to re-equip No. 84 Squadron with Kittyhawks. The squadron received these aircraft during September, making it the first of the RAAF's Boomerang-equipped units to be issued replacement aircraft. In October, No. 84 Squadron became part of the newly formed No. 75 Wing, which was responsible for all the RAAF units stationed in the Torres Strait islands and at Higgins Field near the tip of the Cape York Peninsula. The official history of the RAAF in this period states that while the units stationed at Merauke and Horn Island saw little action during 1943, they "fulfilled a very useful purpose" by protecting the flank of the Allied forces in New Guinea. On 11 March 1944, No. 84 Squadron made an emergency redeployment to Strauss Airfield near Darwin to replace the Supermarine Spitfires of No. 1 Wing, which had been sent to Perth to protect the city from a feared Japanese naval attack. No attack eventuated, and No. 84 Squadron returned to Horn Island on 24 March.

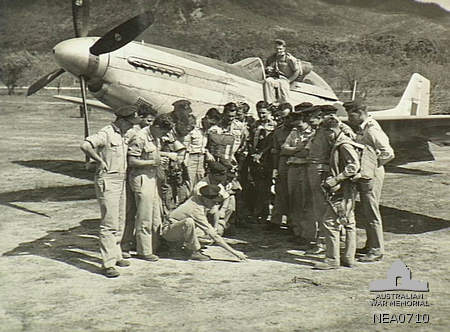
No. 84 Squadron pilots with a Mustang in July 1945

By mid-1944 the Kittyhawk-equipped No. 78 Wing was heavily engaged in supporting the American advance along the north coast of New Guinea and another Kittyhawk wing, No. 81, was in the process of preparing to deploy to this area. To reinforce these two wings, RAAF headquarters decided to disband Nos. 84 and 86 Squadrons. No. 84 Squadron was directed to move to Aitkenvale Aerodrome near Townsville, and its advance and main parties left Horn Island on 17 May and arrived at Aitkenvale four days later. On 12 June, before the squadron was fully disbanded but after all its aircraft had been transferred, the unit was advised that it was to remain active as a cadre with approximately 30 airmen. Two days later it was decided to re-raise No. 84 Squadron as an active unit. It moved to Macrossan Airfield, which was also near Townsville, on 22 June and began to receive new Kittyhawks on 25 August. On 17 November, No. 84 Squadron moved to Ross River, also in the Townsville area, and received more personal and aircraft from No. 86 Squadron, the recently disbanded No. 3 Repair and Servicing Unit and First Tactical Air Force depots.

On 21 May 1945, No. 84 Squadron began to be re-equipped with CAC Mustang fighters, and it was fully equipped with the type by 29 July. However, the war ended before the squadron had completed conversion training and it did not use them in combat. Between 30 August and 7 September, No. 84 Squadron pilots ferried six Mustangs to Labuan island off Borneo for service with the First Tactical Air Force. The squadron's flying activity decreased during 1945, and the unit was disbanded at Ross River on 29 January 1946.
