= RAAF Overseas Headquarters =

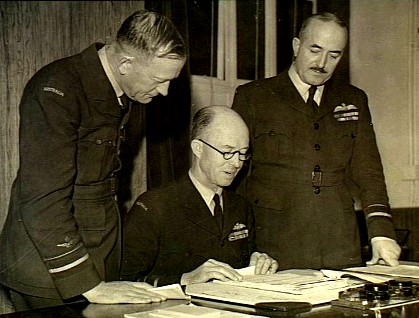
- Air Marshal Williams (centre) at RAAF Overseas Headquarters in England, with Air Vice Marshals Wrigley (left) and McNamara (right), 1941
- Active: 1941–1959
- Country: Australia
- Branch: Royal Australian Air Force
- Role: Administration
- Location: London

Commanders
- Notable commanders: Richard Williams (1941–1942); Frank McNamara (1942); Henry Wrigley (1942–1946); Allan Walters (1951–1952); Bill Garing (1953); Alan Charlesworth (1954–1955)

RAAF Overseas Headquarters was a Royal Australian Air Force (RAAF) administrative unit established in London during World War II.

Under Article XV of the Ottawa Agreement, signed in 1939, the Australian government agreed to form RAAF squadrons for service within British Royal Air Force (RAF) operational commands.

RAAF Overseas Headquarters was formed on 1 December 1941 to oversee the welfare of RAAF personnel posted to:

- the so-called "Article XV squadrons";
- other RAAF units serving in Europe and the Mediterranean and;
- RAAF personnel attached to units of the RAF and other British Commonwealth air forces.

Air minister John McEwen commissioned Richard Williams to establish the headquarters in August 1941, following concerns about the lack of Australian input into assignments of RAAF personnel. McEwen instructed Williams to procure that "RAAF personnel shall be under the command of Australian officers, warrant officers and non-commissioned officers to the fullest possible extent". The headquarters replaced the Air Liaison Office, which had been run out of the High Commission of Australia, London. The new agency was not assigned any subordinate units.

RAAF Overseas Headquarters was disbanded on 19 July 1959.

== See also ==
- RCAF Overseas Headquarters
- Second Australian Imperial Force in the United Kingdom
