= Air Member for Personnel (Australia) =

Australian military appointment

The Air Member for Personnel (AMP) is the senior Royal Australian Air Force officer who is responsible for personnel matters.

== List of Air Members for Personnel ==
The following officers have served as Air Member for Personnel:

- Group Captain Stanley Goble (1928–32)
- Group Captain William Anderson (1933–34)
- Air Commodore Stanley Goble (1934)
- Air Commodore Hazelton Nicholl (RAF) (1935–37)
- Air Vice-Marshal Stanley Goble (1937–39)
- Air Commodore John Russell (RAF) (1939–40)
- Air Commodore William Anderson (1940)
- Air Commodore, then Air Vice-Marshal, Henry Wrigley (1940–42)
- Air Commodore Frank Lukis (1942–43)
- Air Vice-Marshal William Anderson (1943–44)
- Air Vice-Marshal Adrian Cole (1944–45)
- Air Commodore Joe Hewitt (1945–48)
- Air Vice-Marshal Frank Bladin (1948–53)
- Air Vice-Marshal Valston Hancock (1953–55)
- Air Vice-Marshal William Hely (1955 – acting)
- Air Vice-Marshal Frederick Scherger (1955–57)
- Air Vice-Marshal Allan Walters (1957–59)
- Air Vice-Marshal William Hely (1960–66)
- Air Vice Marshal Douglas Candy (1966–69)
- Air Vice-Marshal Brian Eaton (1969–73)
- Air Vice-Marshal John Jordan (1975–76)

== List of Chiefs of Air Force Personnel ==
The following officers have served as Chief of Air Force Personnel:

- Air Vice-Marshal John Jordan (1976)
- Air Vice-Marshal Ian Parker (1976–79)
- Air Vice-Marshal Harold Parker (1979–81)
- Air Vice-Marshal Raymond Trebilco (1981–82)
- Air Vice-Marshal Edward Radford (1983–85)
