= Henry Wrigley =

Royal Australian Air Force senior commander

Henry Neilson Wrigley
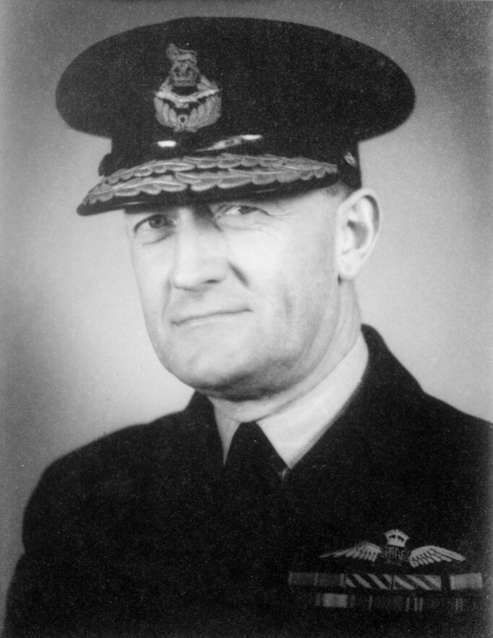
- Air Vice Marshal Henry Wrigley in London, 1944
- Born: 21 April 1892; Melbourne
- Died: 14 September 1987 (aged 95); Melbourne
- Military career
- Allegiance: Australia
- Branch: Royal Australian Air Force
- Service years: 1916–46
- Rank: Air Vice Marshal
- Nickname: "Wrig"
- Commands: No. 3 Squadron AFC (1919); RAAF Station Laverton (1936–39); No. 1 Group (1939–40); Southern Area Command (1940); RAAF Overseas Headquarters (1942–46)
- Conflicts: World War I; Western Front; World War II; European Theatre
- Awards: Commander of the Order of the British Empire; Distinguished Flying Cross; Air Force Cross
- Other work: Author

Air Vice Marshal Henry Neilson Wrigley, (21 April 1892 – 14 September 1987) was a senior commander in the Royal Australian Air Force (RAAF). A pioneering flyer and aviation scholar, he piloted the first trans-Australia flight from Melbourne to Darwin in 1919, and afterwards laid the groundwork for the RAAF's air power doctrine. During World War I, Wrigley joined the Australian Flying Corps and saw combat with No. 3 Squadron on the Western Front, earning the Distinguished Flying Cross; he later commanded the unit and published a history of its wartime exploits. He was awarded the Air Force Cross for his 1919 cross-country flight.

Wrigley was a founding member of the RAAF in 1921 and held staff posts in the ensuing years. In 1936, he was promoted to group captain and took command of RAAF Station Laverton. Raised to air commodore soon after the outbreak of World War II, he became Air Member for Personnel in November 1940. One of his tasks was organising the newly established Women's Auxiliary Australian Air Force and selecting its director, Clare Stevenson, in 1941. He was appointed a Commander of the Order of the British Empire the same year. Wrigley served as air officer commanding RAAF Overseas Headquarters, London, from September 1942 until his retirement from the military in June 1946. He died in 1987 at the age of ninety-five. His writings on air power were collected and published posthumously as The Decisive Factor in 1990.

== Early life and World War I ==
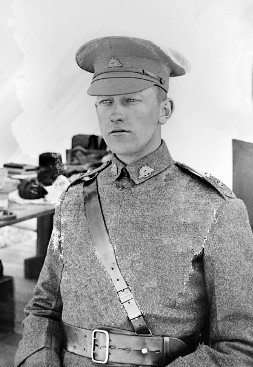
Lieutenant Wrigley at Central Flying School, Point Cook, 1916

Henry Neilson Wrigley was born on 21 April 1892 in Collingwood, a suburb of Melbourne, to Henry and Beatrice Wrigley. He was educated at Richmond Central School and at Melbourne High School, where he joined the cadets. Studying at the University of Melbourne, he became a state school teacher and a member of the militia before the outbreak of World War I. He joined the Australian Flying Corps (AFC) on 5 October 1916. Wrigley trained as a pilot under the tutelage of Lieutenant Eric Harrison at Central Flying School in Point Cook, Victoria, before departing Melbourne on 25 October aboard a troopship bound for Europe.

After further training in England, Wrigley was posted to France and flew on the Western Front with No. 3 Squadron AFC (also known until 1918 as No. 69 Squadron, Royal Flying Corps). Operating Royal Aircraft Factory R.E.8s, the unit was engaged in reconnaissance, artillery-spotting and ground support duties. Having been promoted to captain, Wrigley was awarded the Distinguished Flying Cross for his "exceptional devotion to duty", in particular his persistence in pressing home an attack against enemy infantry on 29 October 1918 in the face of "intense machine gun and rifle fire"; the honour was promulgated in the London Gazette on 3 June 1919. Wrigley later observed that most wartime aircraft were "impossible to fight in", and that senior officers were "too occupied with coaxing aeroplanes into the air and teaching pilots to bring them down again without breaking their necks" to consider the wider implications of air power.

== Between the wars ==
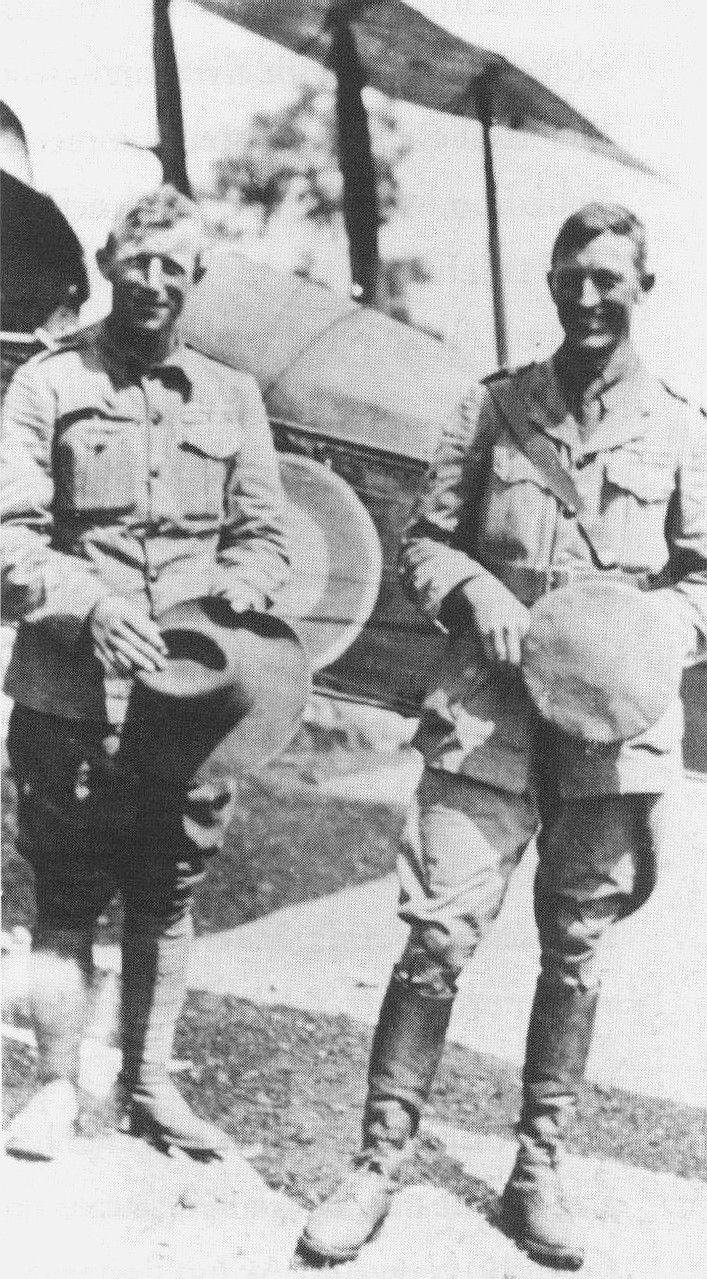
Captain Wrigley (right) with Sergeant Murphy, 1919

Wrigley became a No. 3 Squadron commanding officer in January 1919, and returned to Australia on 6 May. Later that year he took part in the first transcontinental flight across Australia, from Melbourne to Darwin, to coincide with the first England-to-Australia flight. Accompanied by his mechanic and former schoolmate, Sergeant Arthur "Spud" Murphy, Wrigley departed Point Cook on 16 November and arrived in Port Darwin on 12 December, having travelled some 4,500 kilometres (2,800 mi) in forty-seven flying hours. The men flew in a single-engined Royal Aircraft Factory B.E.2, with no radio, over unmapped and often hazardous terrain, and surveyed seventeen potential landing fields along the way. Wrigley considered the choice of Murphy as his cohort "a particularly happy one" but called the aircraft they were assigned "an obsolete type, even for training purposes", while conceding that "it was structurally sound and airworthy". In recognition of their achievement the men were each awarded the Air Force Cross, gazetted on 12 July 1920. Such was the perceived danger of the expedition that while making preparations for the flight back they received a telegram from the Defence Department ordering them to dismantle the B.E.2 and return with it by ship.

On 1 January 1920, Wrigley transferred to the Australian Air Corps (AAC), a temporary organisation formed by the Army following disbandment of the wartime AFC. He was appointed adjutant at Central Flying School the following month. In 1921, Wrigley joined the newly established Royal Australian Air Force (RAAF) as a flight lieutenant. Popularly known as "Wrig", he was one of the original twenty-one officers on the Air Force's strength at its formation that March. For the next seven years he held staff posts at RAAF Headquarters, Melbourne, beginning with the position of staff officer to the director of personnel and training. On 5 July 1922, Wrigley married Marjorie Rees; the couple had a son and a daughter. The same month, he replaced Flight Lieutenant Frank McNamara as staff officer (operations and intelligence). He served as RAAF Training Officer from March 1923 to April 1925—during which time he was promoted to squadron leader—before being appointed director of organisation and staff duties. In November 1927, he took part in an attempt to make the first night flight from Sydney to Melbourne. Taking off from RAAF Station Richmond in an Airco DH.9, Wrigley and his co-pilot were in the air for six hours and covered 345 miles (555 km) before a broken fuel line forced them to land for repairs; they completed the journey the following day.

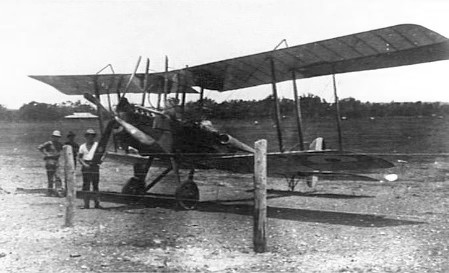
B.E.2 piloted by Wrigley on his pioneering trans-Australia journey with Murphy in 1919

Wrigley travelled to England in 1928 to attend RAF Staff College, Andover, becoming one of the first RAAF officers to complete the course. Remaining in England, he was appointed Australian Air Liaison Officer to the Air Ministry in 1929. That October, he initiated correspondence with the British Air Council to discuss a proposal for the RAAF to adopt as its own the Royal Air Force's motto Per Ardua Ad Astra; informal approval was granted by letter to Wrigley in March 1930. Returning to Australia, he became director of operations and intelligence at RAAF Headquarters in October 1930, and Director of Organisation and Staff Duties in December 1931. He was promoted to wing commander in December 1932. In 1935 he published his history of No. 3 Squadron, The Battle Below, which was considered an authoritative treatment on the subject of army co-operation. He was promoted group captain in July 1936, and that October took over as commanding officer of RAAF Station Laverton, Victoria, from Group Captain McNamara. Wrigley handed over the station's command to Group Captain Adrian Cole in February 1939. In May 1939, Wrigley served as the senior expert assessor on the panel of an inquiry into three recent accidents involving Avro Ansons; the full report handed down in October found that training on the type followed the syllabus, but that pilots needed more practical experience in dealing with in-flight incidents, as human error was the likely explanation for at least one crash.

== World War II ==
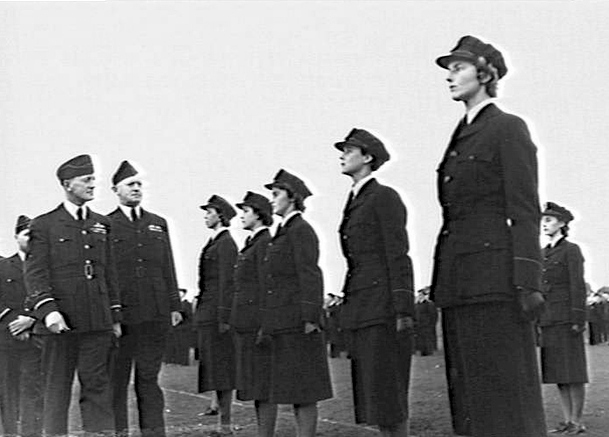
Air Vice Marshal Wrigley (left, front) as Air Member for Personnel, inspecting a graduation class of WAAAF personnel, June 1942

As part of the RAAF's reorganisation following the outbreak of World War II, No. 1 Group was formed under Wrigley's command in Melbourne on 20 November 1939, to oversee the operations of air bases and units in Victoria, South Australia, and Tasmania. Promoted air commodore, in 1940 Wrigley served as air officer commanding (AOC) Southern Area, the successor organisation to No. 1 Group, before taking up the position of Air Member for Personnel (AMP) in November that year. He was appointed a Commander of the Order of the British Empire in the 1941 New Year Honours. As AMP, Wrigley's responsibilities included organising the Women's Auxiliary Australian Air Force (WAAAF), established on 25 March 1941 as the first uniformed women's branch of an armed service in the country. He believed that recruiting servicewomen was essential to augment the many ground staff required to support the war effort, and considered that although such an organisation should be constitutionally separate from the RAAF, its members should be closely integrated within the current force structure.

The Chief of the Air Staff (CAS) was at this time an RAF officer, Air Chief Marshal Sir Charles Burnett, who hoped to see his daughter Sybil-Jean, a veteran of Britain's Women's Auxiliary Air Force, take charge of the WAAAF. Wrigley successfully argued against this, telling Burnett that there had already been "enough public outcry" over a non-Australian being named CAS, and there would be "a further public outcry" if anyone other than an Australian was appointed WAAAF Director. On 21 May, he selected Berlei executive Clare Stevenson as WAAAF Director, passing over temporary appointee Mary Bell, wife of a serving RAAF group captain. Wrigley chose Stevenson on the basis of her management background and because she was not a "socialite". Bell, who was offered the position of deputy director, chose to resign from the WAAAF on learning of Stevenson's appointment, but Wrigley later convinced her to rejoin. Meanwhile, Wrigley played a leading part in the development of the Air Training Corps, formed in April 1941 to facilitate basic training for youths aged sixteen to eighteen who hoped to become RAAF aircrew.

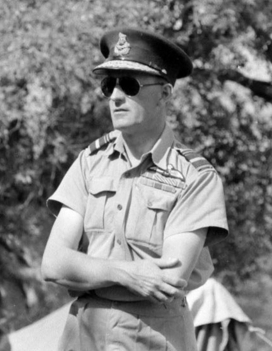
Wrigley as AOC Overseas HQ visiting No. 450 Squadron in Sicily, September 1943

Wrigley's promotion to acting air vice marshal was announced in May 1941, making him only the third member of the RAAF—after Richard Williams and Stanley Goble—to attain this rank. In September 1942, he was posted to London to take over from Frank McNamara as AOC RAAF Overseas Headquarters. For a time, he was involved in a tug-of-war with Air Marshal Williams over just who was in charge. Williams, who commanded Overseas Headquarters at its inception in December 1941, with McNamara as his deputy, had subsequently been appointed as the RAAF's representative to Washington, DC, leaving McNamara in charge of the London office until Wrigley arrived. The Minister for Air, Arthur Drakeford, was in favour of Williams commanding the RAAF offices in both the US and UK while Wrigley acted for him in London, despite Wrigley having been appointed AOC. Wrigley's diary recorded that when Williams returned to London in October 1942 to attend a conference, he began "throwing his weight around" and "intriguing to have himself made AOC, and possibly AOC in C [Air Officer Commanding-in-Chief] of all RAAF units and personnel outside Australia and the SW Pacific". Although Williams departed England in January 1943, the matter was only fully laid to rest in mid-1943, when the CAS, Air Vice Marshal George Jones, advised Williams that it was impractical for him to command offices in both Washington and London.

As AOC RAAF Overseas Headquarters, Wrigley was responsible for looking after the interests of RAAF aircrew stationed in the European and the Middle Eastern theatres, liaising between the British Air Ministry and the Australian government regarding technical developments and information on the war in the Pacific, and negotiating revisions to the terms of the Empire Air Training Scheme (EATS). The role had little influence on the deployment of Australian personnel for the air offensive in Europe, who were subject to RAF policy and strategy even when they belonged to RAAF squadrons. According to the official history of Australia in the war, Wrigley and his predecessors could hardly do more than "retard the centrifugal forces affecting Australian disposition, and repair the worst administrative difficulties arising from wide dispersion".

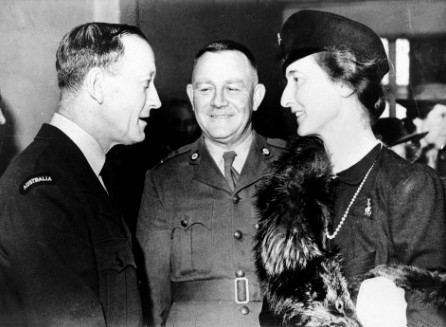
Wrigley (left) with Brigadier C. F. Langley and Lady Somers at the opening of Somers House, a Red Cross Club for repatriated prisoners of war, in May 1945

Wrigley became a familiar and popular figure for the thousands of Australian airmen who passed through London during the war, and was known to take off his jacket and tend bar at Codgers, the headquarters' watering hole. An EATS graduate later remarked that "under Air Vice-Marshal Wrigley we got tremendous service... I was in North Africa, Italy, Sardinia, Corsica and then back in the United Kingdom. We got our mail, we got our comforts... Not only that, when some cow went and pinched 100 quid from me when I was on leave in London, the next day, with a shaking hand, I was able to sign for another 100 quid and have a good time."

In March 1943, following negotiations that had begun the previous year, Wrigley signed a revision of EATS that finally recognised Australia's "national aspirations" regarding concentration of her airmen in RAAF squadrons as opposed to them being scattered throughout RAF units, reasonable prospects of promotion and rotation for staff, and pay and other conditions of service confirmed as being per RAAF stipulations. The official history contended that "for the most part Australia was still left chasing a dream rather than a reality", as many clauses in the agreement were "subject to operational exigencies" and to be adhered to only "as far as possible". Wrigley toured the Mediterranean in September, visiting No. 459 Squadron in the Middle East, and travelling to Sicily to interview ground staff of No. 450 Squadron over their grievances concerning lack of promotion and leave; his presence was considered to have defused this situation.

Wrigley's son Ronald enlisted in the Royal Australian Navy in September 1944 and served until his demobilisation in 1946. The end of hostilities in Europe on 7 May 1945 raised a major logistical challenge for Wrigley as the senior officer responsible for some 13,500 RAAF personnel spread across Britain, the Mediterranean, and the continent, only a minority of whom were in nominally Australian squadrons, the bulk serving with RAF establishments. "The task was energetically met", according to the official history; fewer than 1,000 RAAF personnel remained in RAF units by the 1st of September, although repatriation continued through into the new year.

== Retirement and legacy ==
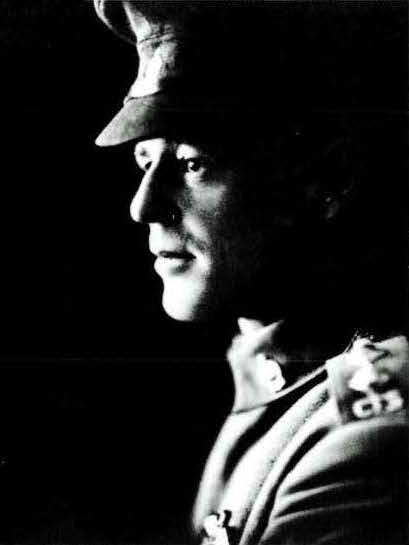
Henry Wrigley, 1917

Wrigley was forcibly retired from the RAAF in 1946, along with other senior commanders and veterans of World War I, ostensibly to make way for the advancement of younger and equally capable officers. Keenly disappointed with the decision, Wrigley was officially discharged on 6 June. He found it difficult to secure civilian employment because, "by the time I got back, all the worthwhile jobs round Australia had been snapped up by people, not only air force people but other people on the spot". After an unsuccessful attempt to run his own retail business, he "eventually earned a living by taking on some administrative jobs which carried on for a few years". Wrigley was made an honorary air vice marshal in July 1956. In 1966 he became executive officer of the Victorian Overseas Foundation, and later a trustee. He published Aircraft and Economic Development: The RAAF Contribution through the Royal Aeronautical Society in 1969. In March 1971, he was among a select group of surviving founding members of the RAAF who attended a celebratory dinner at the Hotel Canberra to mark the service's Golden Jubilee; his fellow guests included Air Marshal Sir Richard Williams, Air Vice Marshal Bill Anderson, Air Commodore Hippolyte De La Rue, and Wing Commander Sir Lawrence Wackett. After the death of his first wife, Marjorie, Wrigley married Zenda Edwards on 5 January 1972. In December 1979, he was the guest of honour at celebrations marking sixty years of flying at Darwin; the RAAF flew him from Point Cook to Darwin to commemorate his historic 1919 flight with Arthur Murphy. Wrigley wrote a history of the Victorian branch of the United Services Institution in 1980. Aged ninety-five, he died in Melbourne on 14 September 1987.

An "inveterate note-taker" according to friends, during his career Wrigley compiled extensive documentation concerning the theory and practice of air power, on which he lectured among his colleagues in the RAAF during the 1920s. The concepts that he propagated included air superiority, the need for an air force to be separate from the other branches of the armed services, control of the air as a means of carrying out offensive strikes, and the substitution of aerial forces for ground troops. Though always arguing for the independence of the air arm, Wrigley was quick to dispel any notion that it would simply "arrive from God knows where, drop [its] bombs God knows where, and go off again God knows where"; rather it should act in concert with the army and navy in furtherance of government policy. He is thus credited with laying the foundations for the RAAF's modern air power doctrine, which would eventually be codified as the Air Power Manual in 1990. Wrigley's widow bequeathed twenty volumes of his writings, maps, and photographs to the RAAF Museum at Point Cook after his death; they were edited and published by Air Commodore Brendan O'Loghlin and Wing Commander Alan Stephens in 1990 as The Decisive Factor: Air Power Doctrine by Air Vice-Marshal H.N. Wrigley. In 1996, Wrigley's former residence as commanding officer of RAAF Station Laverton before World War II was christened Wrigley House in his honour. His name is also borne by Henry Wrigley Drive, approaching Darwin International Airport. In March 2010, the Chief of Air Force, Air Marshal Mark Binskin, established the AVM H.N. Wrigley Prize for air power analysis, as part of the annual Chief of Air Force Essay Competition.

== Notes ==
Military offices
Preceded by Frank McNamara	Commanding officer RAAF Station Laverton; 1936–1939	Succeeded by Adrian Cole
Preceded by William Anderson	Air Member for Personnel; 1940–1942	Succeeded by Frank Lukis
