= No. 86 Squadron RAAF =

Royal Australian Air Force squadron

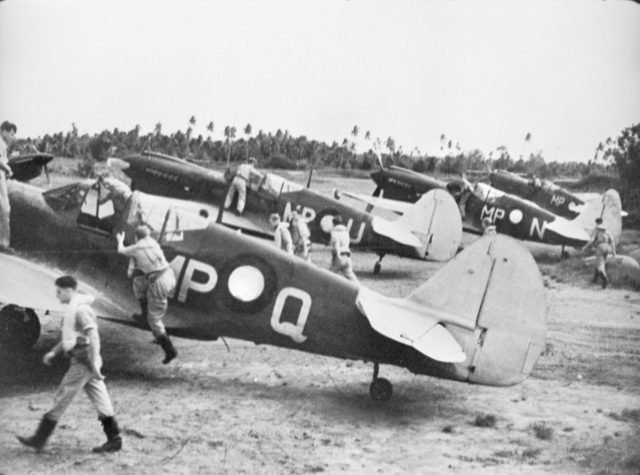
- Members of No. 86 Squadron RAAF about to take off in their Kittyhawk fighters at Merauke in April 1944
- Active: 1943–1945
- Country: Australia
- Branch: Royal Australian Air Force
- Type: Fighter
- Engagements: New Guinea Campaign

Insignia
- Squadron code: MP

Aircraft flown
- Fighter: P-40 Kittyhawk (1943–1945); P-51 Mustang (1945)

No. 86 Squadron was a Royal Australian Air Force (RAAF) fighter squadron of World War II. The squadron was formed in March 1943 and was deployed to Merauke in Dutch New Guinea in July that year. While No. 86 Squadron was stationed at Merauke until April 1944, it saw little combat. After being transferred back to Australia its aircraft and personnel were transferred to other units, and only a nucleus of the squadron remained. While it was re-equipped with new aircraft in June 1945, the war ended before the squadron was ready for combat and it was disbanded in December 1945.

== History ==
No. 86 Squadron was formed at Gawler, South Australia, on 4 March 1943 and was equipped with Curtiss P-40M Kittyhawk fighter aircraft. In May that year it moved to Townsville, Queensland, in May where it completed its training.

In early July 1943, No. 86 Squadron moved to Merauke in Dutch New Guinea to protect this base against Japanese air attack. Until this point the base had been protected by CAC Boomerang fighters of No. 84 Squadron flying out of Horn Island, but the completion of an airfield at Meruake allowed a Kittyhawk squadron to take on this duty. The decision to station a fighter squadron at Merauke was made in response to concerns that the Japanese could potentially attack and occupy the strategically located settlement. The Australian Army garrison there was also expanded. While there was generally little Japanese activity in the area by the time the squadron arrived, on 27 July sixteen No. 86 Squadron Kittyhawks were scrambled to intercept four Japanese aircraft which had been detected by radar. However, the Japanese aircraft were able to leave the area before the squadron could make contact with them. A force of 16 Japanese Mitsubishi G4M bombers and the same number of fighters raided Merauke on 9 September and were intercepted by 14 Kittyhawks from No. 86 Squadron. While most of the Kittyhawks suffered gun malfunctions and were unable to engage the Japanese, the squadron shot down two G4Ms and a Nakajima Ki-43 fighter without loss.

From September 1943, the RAAF units in the Merauke–Torres Strait area had little to do as few Japanese aircraft operated in the area. No. 86 Squadron next saw combat against Japanese aircraft on 22 and 23 January 1944 when it intercepted and destroyed two G4Ms and one Mitsubishi A6M Zero fighter near Cape Valsch; after these engagements, the Japanese ceased sending aircraft into the Merauke area.

No. 86 Squadron also undertook other tasks in addition to its air defence duties. The squadron regularly conducted patrols of the Merauke area, escorted supply ships and exercised with Australian Army units. It also undertook several ground attack missions, including an operation on 31 January 1944 in which four Japanese barges were sunk in the mouth of the Lorentz River. The official history of the RAAF in this period notes that although the two squadrons on Merauke and Horn Island saw little action, they "fulfilled a very useful purpose" by protecting the flank of the Allied forces in New Guinea.

The squadron's tour of duty at Merauke ended on 25 April 1944, when it was replaced by No. 120 (NEI) Squadron. No. 86 Squadron subsequently moved to Strauss Airfield in the Northern Territory. Shortly after it arrived, 19 of its Kittyhawks were transferred to No. 77 Squadron. This left the future of the squadron in doubt, and on 26 May it was announced that the unit was to be reduced to a cadre and its personnel used to form No. 5 Repair and Servicing Depot at Bohle River Aerodrome near Townsville, while its remaining Kittyhawks would be transferred to No. 80 Squadron. However, in June, it was decided to retain No. 86 Squadron in nucleus form with a strength of two Kittyhawks and 30 personnel.

In late June 1944, No. 86 Squadron moved from Bohle River Aerodrome to Macrossan. It received more Kittyhawks and undertook training, and in June 1945, began to be re-equipped with North American P-51D Mustang fighters. The squadron established detachments at Merauke and Thursday Island, but the war ended before it could move forward into the combat zones. No. 86 Squadron was disbanded at Bohle River Aerodrome on 20 December 1945.
