= Mackinolty =

Mackinolty is a surname. Notable people with the surname include:

- Chips Mackinolty (born 1954), Australian poster artist
- George Mackinolty (1895–1951), Royal Australian Air Force commander
