= Air Board (Australia) =

Royal Australian Air Force board of control

Australian Air Board

Agency overview
- Formed: 1920
- Dissolved: 1976
- Superseding agency: Chief of the Air Staff Advisory Committee
- Jurisdiction: Royal Australian Air Force
- Headquarters: Melbourne (1920–61); Canberra (1961–76)
- Parent department: Department of Defence (1920–39, 1973–76); Department of Air (1939–73)
- Parent agency: Australian Air Council (1920–29)

The Air Board, also known as the Administrative Air Board, or the Air Board of Administration, was the controlling body of the Royal Australian Air Force (RAAF) from 1921 to 1976. It was composed of senior RAAF officers as well as some civilian members, and chaired by the Chief of the Air Staff (CAS). The CAS was the operational head of the Air Force, and the other board members were responsible for specific areas of the service such as personnel, supply, engineering, and finance. Originally based in Melbourne, the board relocated to Canberra in 1961.

Formed in November 1920, the Air Board's first task was to establish the air force that it was to administer; this took place in March 1921. The board was initially responsible to the Australian Air Council, which included the chiefs of the Army and Navy; after the council's dissolution in 1929 the Air Board had equal status with the other service boards, reporting directly to the Minister for Defence. In 1939, shortly after the outbreak of World War II, the Department of Defence was split and the Air Board came under the purview of the newly created Department of Air, headed by the Minister for Air. In 1973 the service departments merged into a new Department of Defence and the board again reported to the Minister for Defence.

The Air Board's composition changed several times over the years; the only constant, from October 1922, was the position of CAS. According to Air Force regulations, the board was collectively responsible for administering the RAAF, not the CAS alone. In February 1976, along with the other service boards, the Air Board was dissolved; the CAS was invested with the individual responsibility for commanding the RAAF. The Air Board was succeeded by the Chief of the Air Staff Advisory Committee, but the CAS was not bound by its advice.

== Organisation and responsibilities ==
The Air Board was responsible for control and administration of the Royal Australian Air Force (RAAF), including operations, training, maintenance, and acquisitions. On its establishment in 1920 the board comprised the Director of Intelligence and Organisation, Director of Personnel and Training, Director of Equipment, and Finance Member. Its purview included the Air Force's organisation and dispersal, allocation of aircraft to meet Army and Navy requirements, selection of air bases and buildings, development of training programs and schools, and recruitment. The agency's composition evolved until, in 1954, it included the Chief of the Air Staff (CAS), Air Member for Personnel (AMP), Air Member for Technical Services (AMTS), Air Member for Supply and Equipment (AMSE), and Secretary of the Department of Air. The board essentially retained this form until its dissolution in 1976.

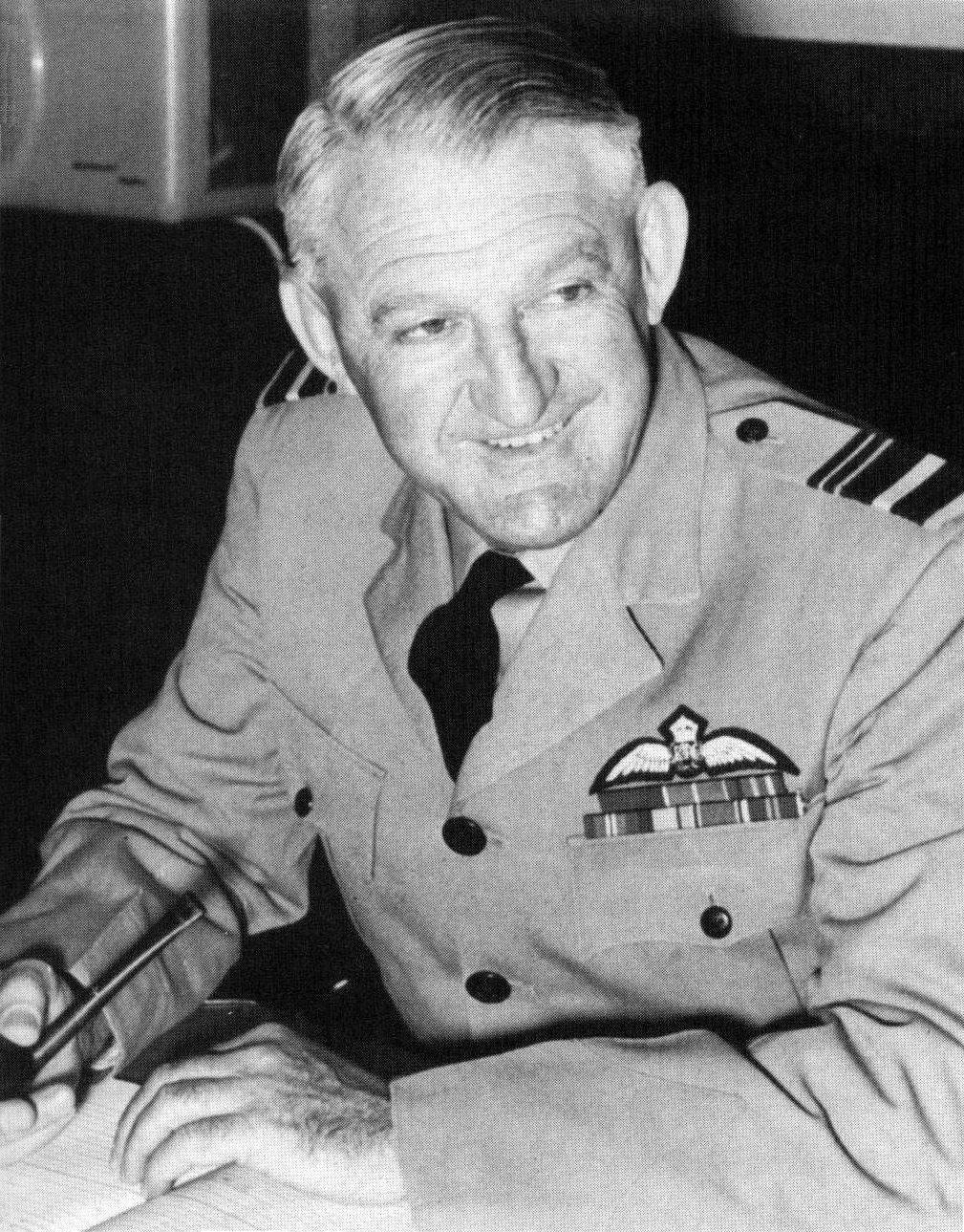
Air Vice-Marshal Wackett, longest-serving member of the Air Board, c. 1958

The CAS was responsible for the operational side of the RAAF, from policy and plans to overall combat command. As chairman of the Air Board, he controlled the agency's meetings, agenda, and minutes. According to Air Force regulations, the Air Board as a body was charged with running the RAAF; this power was not invested in the CAS alone. In practice, the CAS's operational and administrative responsibilities allowed him to exert a significant influence. Generally though, decisions were arrived at through collective discussion and consensus; each board member had the right to table a dissenting report, but such instances were rare. Despite the efforts of some government ministers and at least one CAS, Air Marshal John McCauley, to prevent members serving more than three to five years consecutively on the board, no arbitrary term limits were enforced. Ellis Wackett, the RAAF's senior engineering officer from 1942, maintained his place on the board for seventeen years, the longest tenure of any member; his experience and intellect made him, according to the official history of the post-war RAAF, "singularly adept at bringing a committee around to his point of view". The arguably disproportionate sway held by technical services continued with Wackett's successor, Air Vice-Marshal Ernie Hey, who served on the board for twelve years.

As well as being members of the board, AMP, AMTS, and AMSE were the heads of their respective branches within the Air Force and had delegated authority to administer those branches. Other officers such as the Deputy Chief of the Air Staff might attend meetings, but were not members of the board. The departmental secretary was a senior public servant, the permanent head of the Department of Air from 1939 to 1973 and afterwards a deputy secretary of the Department of Defence, responsible to the board for finance, administration, and direction of civilian support staff. The minister of the department could choose to chair meetings and was expected to sign off on all decisions made by the board. This sometimes involved the minister in mundane matters, such as the acquisition of furniture and foodstuffs. Historian Alan Stephens observed that the board itself, despite consisting of an air marshal, three air vice-marshals, and a high-level government official, could devote "an inordinate amount of meeting time" to administrative minutiae, rather than concentrating on higher policy, major purchases, or operational aspects. Stephens contrasted this situation with the board's achievements in more substantial matters, such as the "educational revolution" it oversaw between 1945 and 1953, when programs such as RAAF College, RAAF Staff College, and the RAAF apprentice scheme were introduced.

== History ==
=== Early years ===
==== Establishing the new service ====
The remnants of the wartime Australian Flying Corps (AFC) were disbanded in December 1919 and succeeded the next month by the Australian Air Corps (AAC), which was, like the AFC, part of the Australian Army. The AAC was an interim organisation intended to remain in place until the establishment of a permanent Australian air service. Since 1905, a Military Board and a Naval Board had controlled the armed services in Australia. The Chief of the Naval Staff, Rear Admiral Sir Percy Grant, objected to the AAC being under Army control, and argued that an air board should be formed to oversee the AAC and any permanent Australian air force. The Navy further proposed that the new air service include army and naval support wings, each controlled by their respective boards, leaving the air board in direct charge of training only. The Army rejected this notion on the grounds that it recreated the divisions in Britain's wartime air services that were only resolved with the creation of the Royal Air Force (RAF). A temporary air board first met on 29 January 1920, the Army being represented by Brigadier General Thomas Blamey and Lieutenant Colonel Richard Williams, and the Royal Australian Navy by Captain Wilfred Nunn and Lieutenant Colonel Stanley Goble, a former member of Britain's Royal Naval Air Service (RNAS) then seconded to the Navy Office. Williams was given responsibility for administering the AAC on behalf of the board.

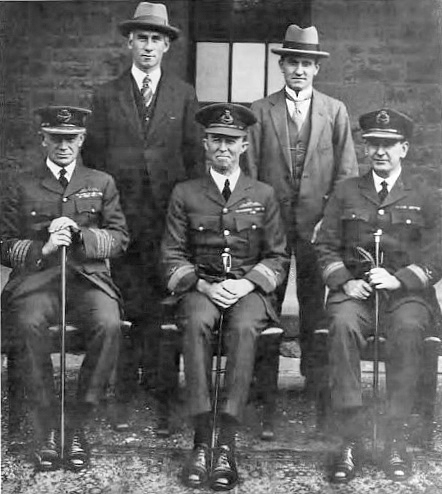
Members of the inaugural Air Board, pictured in 1928. Back row: Major P.E. Coleman (Secretary); A.C. Joyce (Finance Member). Front row: Group Captain S.J. Goble (Director of Personnel and Training); Air Commodore R. Williams (Director of Intelligence and Organisation); Wing Commander R.A. McBain (Director of Equipment).

The permanent Air Board was instituted on 9 November 1920 to oversee the day-to-day running of the proposed Australian Air Force that would succeed the extant AAC. The board's members consisted of Williams as Director of Intelligence and Organisation, Goble as Director of Personnel and Training, Captain (later Squadron Leader) Percy McBain as Director of Equipment, and Albert Joyce as Finance Member (FM). The selection of Williams and Goble was a compromise between the competing interests of the Army and Navy for control of Australia's air arm: Williams, formerly of the AFC and Australia's senior airman, was the Army's choice, and Goble, the RNAS veteran, was the Navy's. A superior policy-making and budgetary control body, the Air Council, was formed the same day as the Air Board and consisted of the Minister for Defence, the Chief of the General Staff, the Chief of the Naval Staff, the Controller of Civil Aviation, and two members of the Air Board (Williams and Goble). This arrangement ensured that the new Air Force would be, according to historian Chris Coulthard-Clark, "anything but an independent and co-equal third service". Part of the rationale was the youth of the Air Board's officers—Williams, Goble and McBain were all aged thirty or under—and their relative lack of administrative experience; it also gave the Army and Navy a greater say in how the new service should run. The Air Board and Air Council were made responsible for administering the AAC from 22 November.

The Air Board's first official meeting, which took place on 22 December 1920, prepared the groundwork for the new air service. Williams proposed among other things an organisation consisting of seven squadrons—two for air defence, two for army cooperation, and three for naval cooperation—as well as a flying training school, a recruit depot, a stores depot, a liaison office in London, an overarching headquarters, and two wing headquarters. The Air Council approved these plans in principle the next day. Public servant and former Army officer Major Patrick Coleman was appointed Secretary to the Air Board—an administrative position—on 1 January 1921. By 15 February, the Air Board had chosen a date for the formation of the Australian Air Force (AAF): 31 March that year. Williams carefully selected this date rather than 1 April, the birthday of the RAF, "to prevent nasty people referring to us as 'April Fools'". In accordance with a proposal by Goble at the first board meeting, held over at the time but subsequently approved, upon its formation the Air Force adopted the RAF's rank structure. The board's three officers, along with their staff of ten, were based at the newly raised Air Force Headquarters co-located with the Department of Defence at Victoria Barracks, Melbourne.

In July 1921, the Air Board recommended engaging Australian Aircraft & Engineering to manufacture six Avro 504 trainers, as much to encourage the local aircraft industry as for any practical purpose given the AAF already had many of the type, and the Air Council agreed. The same month, the Air Board selected Richmond, near Sydney, as the site for the AAF's first air base in New South Wales, to augment its extant base at Point Cook in Victoria. Soon after, Williams proposed—and the Air Board approved—an ensign similar to the RAF's but displaying the Southern Cross over the RAF roundel. After the Air Council requested the opinion of the British Air Ministry, the RAF's Chief of the Air Staff, Sir Hugh Trenchard, expressed a desire to see all Dominion air forces employ the RAF ensign. The Air Council concurred, and the Air Force did not adopt a uniquely Australian ensign that included the Southern Cross until 1948. The AAF pursued its own course in relation to the colour of its uniform, Williams choosing a unique shade of dark blue in contrast to the blue-grey of the RAF. The Air Council had sought approval from The Crown to use the adjective "Royal" for the AAF before it formed in March; this was granted in May and took effect when the necessary order by the Governor-General was promulgated on 13 August. The same month, the Air Board approved Squadron Leader McBain's proposal for the "A series" of aircraft numbering: "A" (for Australia), then a figure designating the model, and then the individual aircraft's three-digit identifier. Williams submitted proposals for the creation of a reserve force to the Air Council in November, and these were approved, although it was not until March 1925 that the Air Board announced that the first Citizen Air Force (CAF) squadrons were to be formed. In August 1926 the board ordered the introduction of parachutes to RAAF aircraft. Having inherited World War I-era Imperial Gift aircraft on the RAAF's formation, the Air Board ordered Australia's first modern fighter, the Bristol Bulldog, in January 1929. Later that year, the board requested permission from the British government to use the RAF motto Per ardua ad astra for the RAAF, and this was granted.

==== Challenges of command and status ====
As senior officer on the Air Board, from April 1921 Williams was known as First Air Member, the fledgling Air Force initially not being deemed suitable for a chief of staff appointment equivalent to the Army and Navy. Often referred to as the "Father of the RAAF", Williams became the first Chief of the Air Staff (CAS) in October 1922. At the same time, as a cost-cutting measure, the Air Board was reduced to three members: the CAS, the Chief of the Administrative Staff, and the FM. The CAS continued to be known alternatively as First Air Member, and the Chief of the Administrative Staff—Air Member for Personnel (AMP) after 1927—as Second Air Member, for most of the decade.

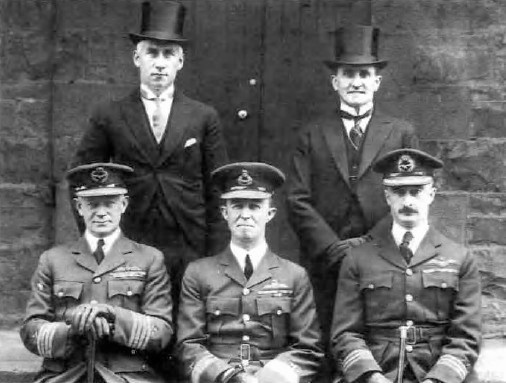
Members of the Air Board in November 1930. Back row: Major P.E. Coleman (Secretary); A.C. Joyce (Finance Member). Front row: Group Captain S.J. Goble (Air Member for Personnel); Air Commodore R. Williams (Chief of the Air Staff); Wing Commander W.H. Anderson (Air Member for Supply).

Goble took over as CAS from Williams in December 1922, and for the next seventeen years the pair alternated in the position, an arrangement that "almost inevitably fostered an unproductive rivalry" according to Alan Stephens. Under Air Force regulations, the CAS role was intended to be "first among equals", decisions being arrived at collectively and members able to submit dissenting opinions to the Minister for Defence, but Williams dominated the board to such an extent that in 1939 Goble complained that his colleague appeared to consider the Air Force his personal command. Nor did the Air Council exercise any control over the board from 1925, when the council ceased meeting. The Air Council was formally dissolved in 1929, making the Air Board equivalent to the Military and Naval Boards under the Minister for Defence. The same year, a new position on the Air Board, Air Member for Supply (AMS), was created. Neither officer who filled this position over the next decade, Bill Anderson and Adrian Cole, had logistics training, and the official post-war history concluded that they relied heavily on the specialist knowledge of their experienced subordinate, the RAAF Director of Transport and Equipment, George Mackinolty.

The RAAF faced challenges to its status as a service co-equal with the Army and Navy during the 1920s and 1930s. On several occasions the Air Board had to agitate for official representation commensurate with the other services. The Air Board considered RAAF funding so low in mid-1924 that it was existing on a "hand to mouth" basis and could not maintain its program; Goble told a defence committee meeting with Prime Minister Stanley Bruce that the service had "two machines fit for war". In 1930, and again in 1932, the government of the day seriously considered amalgamating the Air Force with one of the other services. As CAS, Williams, who maintained personal correspondence with successive RAF chiefs, Trenchard and Sir John Salmond, as allies in the fight for an independent air force, received much of the credit for seeing off these threats of merger. Only after 1932, Williams contended, was the position of the RAAF as a separate entity assured. Senior RAAF officers recognised the value of assistance to the civil community in terms of training and public relations, and in the 1920s and 1930s the Air Board authorised participation in a series of photographic surveys, meteorological flights, search-and-rescue missions, aerobatic displays, and air races. The board was able to embark on an expansion program in 1934 thanks to an increase in overall defence spending by the Australian government, acquiring new bases, squadrons, and aircraft, including the Avro Anson, the RAAF's first low-wing monoplane and its first with a retractable undercarriage. In May 1938 the Minister for Defence approved the Air Board's recommendation to engage the recently formed Commonwealth Aircraft Corporation (CAC) to produce under licence the North American NA-33 trainer as the CAC Wirraway; the British government vigorously opposed the choice of a US design but the Australian government stuck by the decision.

In February 1939, Williams was dismissed from his position as CAS and posted to the UK following publication of a report by Marshal of the Royal Air Force Sir Edward Ellington that criticised air safety in the RAAF. According to a statement by Australian Prime Minister Joseph Lyons, "the Air Board cannot be absolved from blame for these conditions and ... the main responsibility rests on the Chief of the Air Staff". In what became a public slanging match with the government, the Air Board questioned Ellington's use of statistics to compare the safety record of the RAAF with the RAF's. Goble, who as AMP since January 1938 might have been considered responsible for safety standards, maintained that Williams had personally overseen air training since 1934. Williams believed that Generals Sir Harry Chauvel and Sir Brudenell White had influenced Ellington's thinking as part of a campaign to undermine the status of the Air Force. On Williams' departure, Goble was appointed acting CAS.

=== World War II ===
==== Home front and operations in the Middle East and Europe ====
On the eve of World War II, the RAAF comprised twelve flying squadrons, two aircraft depots, and a flying school, situated at five air bases in Victoria, New South Wales, and Western Australia, all directly administered and controlled through Air Force Headquarters in Melbourne. The Air Board consisted of the CAS, AMP, AMS, and FM. Each of these members was responsible for their own branches within the RAAF, and each branch consisted of several directorates. Officer staff across all board members' branches at Air Force Headquarters numbered thirty-eight.

In October 1939, following the outbreak of war, and without consulting the Air Board, the Australian government agreed to participate in the Empire Air Training Scheme (EATS). The next month, the government reorganised the Department of Defence into four ministries: the Department of Defence Coordination, headed by Prime Minister Robert Menzies, and the Departments of Air, Army and Navy, each with their own minister; the Air Board became responsible to the Minister for Air. The board's FM, Melville Langslow, was appointed Secretary of the Department of Air. In anticipation of a significant increase in manpower and units, the Air Board decided to decentralise command and control of the RAAF. Goble proposed in January 1940 to organise the Air Force along functional lines with Home Defence, Training, and Maintenance Commands, as well as an Overseas Command. The Air Board supported the plan but the Australian government chose not to implement it. Goble was replaced in February 1940 by Air Chief Marshal Sir Charles Burnett, RAF, who focused on rapidly expanding the RAAF to meet the needs of EATS and believed that Australia's huge land mass would make a functional command system unwieldy. He reorganised the Air Force into a geographically based "area" system. The air officer commanding (AOC) each area was delegated operational and administrative authority within their sphere of responsibility, while the CAS and Air Board determined high-level policy.

In March 1940, the Air Board was reorganised to comprise the CAS, AMP, Air Member for Organisation and Equipment (AMOE), Director-General of Supply and Production (DGSP), and FM; a Business Member (BM) was added in December. Like the FM, DGSP and BM were civilian positions. DGSP superseded the position of AMS. Williams, promoted to acting air marshal, was recalled from Britain to take up the position of AMOE. According to Williams, Burnett acted "as though he were a Commander in Chief", ignoring the Air Board's role in controlling the RAAF. Henry Wrigley, AMP from 1940 to 1942, contended in a 1986 interview that Burnett had "never held a post in which he was a member of a corporate body like our Air Board or the Air Council in Britain ... he was very prone to try and override members of the Air Board ... And the duties and responsibilities of members of the Air Board were definitely laid down in the Air Force regulations ..." Burnett did gain credit for pushing for the establishment of the Women's Auxiliary Australian Air Force (WAAAF), formed in March 1941 as the first uniformed women's branch of an armed service in the country. He did so in the face of opposition from within the RAAF, as well as from both sides of Federal politics. The Air Board had considered a letter from Mary Bell, wife of an RAAF officer, regarding a women's auxiliary in November 1939 but took no action at the time. In June 1940, Burnett invited Bell to produce a proposal for the women's service. Wrigley recalled that Burnett wanted his elder daughter, a veteran of Britain's Women's Auxiliary Air Force, to take charge of the WAAAF. As AMP, with responsibility for the new branch, Wrigley told Burnett that there had already been "enough public outcry" over a non-Australian being named CAS, and there would be "a further public outcry" if anyone other than an Australian was appointed WAAAF Director. Instead, Wrigley selected a Sydney-based corporate executive, Clare Stevenson.

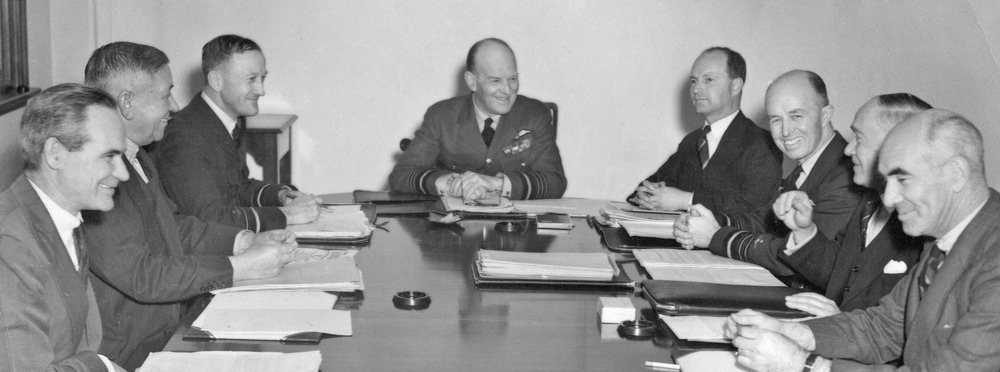
Air Board meeting, c. 1941. From left: C.V. Kellway (Finance Member); R. Lawson (Director General of Supply and Production); Air Vice-Marshal H.N. Wrigley (Air Member for Personnel); Air Chief Marshal Sir Charles Burnett (Chief of the Air Staff); F.J. Mulrooney (Secretary to the Air Board); Air Marshal R. Williams (Air Member for Organisation and Equipment); W.S. Jones (Business Member); M.C. Langslow (Secretary of the Department of Air).

RAAF forces in the Middle East and Europe were fully integrated into the RAF chain of command. In contrast to the Canadians, who attempted to gain a place on Britain's Air Council and were able to establish No. 6 Group RCAF as part of RAF Bomber Command, the Australian government did not press for control of its own assets in the air war against Germany. The Air Board established RAAF Overseas Headquarters, London, in December 1941, to look after the interests of aircrew stationed in Europe and the Middle East, but the headquarters had little influence on the deployment of Australian personnel, who were subject to RAF policy and strategy even when they belonged to ostensibly RAAF squadrons. According to the official history of Australia in the war, air officers commanding the headquarters could only attempt to "retard the centrifugal forces affecting Australian disposition, and repair the worst administrative difficulties arising from wide dispersion".

==== Operations in the South West Pacific ====
Supporting General Douglas MacArthur's "island-hopping" campaign in the Pacific demanded an airfield construction capability that the Air Force did not possess at the onset of war. In February 1942 the Air Board proposed raising RAAF engineering units to fulfil this requirement, and Cabinet agreed the following month. Allied Air Forces Headquarters was formed in April and assumed the operational responsibilities of the CAS in the South West Pacific Area (SWPA). Burnett had recommended the Air Board's abolition but the Australian government rejected the idea. Instead, the board was again reorganised: the offices of AMOE and DGSP were dissolved and replaced by those of the Air Member for Supply and Equipment (AMSE) and Air Member for Engineering and Maintenance (AMEM) to focus on the two key logistical functions of supply and engineering, respectively. In June, Air Commodore Mackinolty became the inaugural AMSE and Air Commodore Ellis Wackett the inaugural AMEM. Author Norman Ashworth observed that splitting the logistical functions of the Air Board in this manner appeared to be a "uniquely Australian" experiment, and it was not inconceivable that the organisation had been "tailored" to suit the talents of the highly regarded Mackinolty and Wackett.

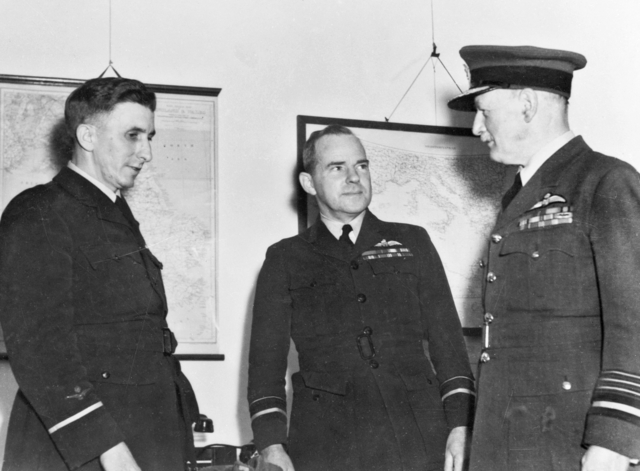
The newly appointed CAS, Air Vice-Marshal Jones (left), with Air Vice-Marshal Bostock (centre), and the outgoing CAS, Air Chief Marshal Burnett, May 1942

In September 1942 the Allied Air Forces commander, Major General George Kenney, formed the majority of his US flying units into the Fifth Air Force, and their Australian counterparts into RAAF Command, led by Air Vice-Marshal Bill Bostock. This effectively made Bostock the RAAF's operational commander in the SWPA, but administrative authority was still in the hands of the Air Board and the CAS, Air Vice-Marshal George Jones, who had taken over from Burnett in May 1942. The division of operational and administrative command was the source of acute personal tension between Jones, who though de jure head of the RAAF had no say in its operational tasking, and Bostock, who was responsible for directing the RAAF's operations but was wholly dependent on Jones and the Air Board for the supplies and equipment needed to fight the war. The in-fighting adversely affected command and morale in the RAAF, and hurt the service's reputation with its American allies.

In March and April 1943 the government considered dissolving the Air Board and unifying control of the RAAF under a single commander senior to both Jones and Bostock, a move supported by the Commander-in-Chief Australian Military Forces, General Blamey, who noted that a similar arrangement was already in place for the Army, but this never eventuated. Meanwhile, the Air Board, with the approval of the Minister for Air, Arthur Drakeford, ordered that Bostock be removed from RAAF Command and replaced with Air Commodore Joe Hewitt. Prime Minister John Curtin vetoed the decision on the grounds that such changes in higher command required agreement from the Americans; MacArthur and Kenney subsequently made clear that they did not consider Hewitt "an adequate replacement" for Bostock. In June that year the Air Board initiated inquiries with the Americans regarding helicopter development; following meetings between Jones and the Chief of the General Staff, Lieutenant General John Northcott, the board took responsibility for helicopter acquisition. This led to the order in 1946 of a Sikorsky S-51 for rescue and emergency work, but the board also began investigating the helicopter's potential for air-land and air-sea warfare.

The Air Board reviewed the findings of the inquiry by Justice John Vincent Barry into the "Morotai Mutiny" of April 1945, when senior pilots of the Australian First Tactical Air Force (No. 1 TAF) attempted to resign their commissions to protest the relegation of RAAF fighter squadrons to strategically unimportant ground attack missions in the South West Pacific. Hewitt, the AMP, recommended that the AOC No. 1 TAF, Air Commodore Harry Cobby, be removed from command, along with his two senior staff officers. The majority of the board saw no reason to take such action, leaving Hewitt to append a dissenting note to its decision. Drakeford supported Hewitt's position, and the three senior No. 1 TAF officers were later dismissed from their posts.

During the war, the Air Board had overseen the RAAF's expansion from a complement in 1939 of 246 obsolescent machines including Wirraways, Ansons and Lockheed Hudsons, to a strength in 1945 of 5,620 sophisticated aircraft such as Supermarine Spitfires, P-51 Mustangs, de Havilland Mosquitoes, and B-24 Liberators; to support this force, the Air Force had provided all-through training for 18,000 technical staff, and further education for 35,000 more schooled initially outside the service.

=== Post-war years ===
==== Demobilisation and the Interim Air Force ====
Following the end of the Pacific War in August 1945, SWPA was dissolved and the Air Board regained full control of all its operational formations. The board was once more the final authority for RAAF matters, exercising control through Air Force Headquarters.

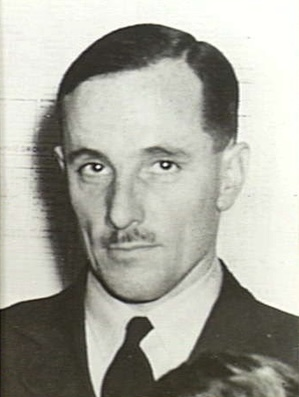
Air Vice-Marshal Hewitt, the Air Board member primarily responsible for post-war demobilisation, pictured in 1942

The Air Board's prime task in the immediate post-war period was transforming what was by some accounts the world's fourth-largest air force, numbering approximately 173,000 personnel, into a far smaller peacetime organisation. Much of the responsibility devolved to Hewitt as AMP. The board had wanted a force of thirty-four squadrons and around 34,500 personnel but in January 1946 was instructed by the Australian government to reduce strength to 20,000. Hewitt believed the RAAF was in danger of losing some of its best staff through rapid, unplanned demobilisation, and recommended it stabilise the workforce for two years at 20,000 while it reviewed post-war requirements. Although the Air Board supported Hewitt's proposal, government cost-cutting resulted in the strength of this "Interim Air Force" being reduced more quickly than planned, to around 13,000 by October 1946 and under 8,000 by the end of 1948. With the government's concurrence, the Air Board arranged the summary dismissal of many high-ranking officers including Williams, Goble, and Bostock despite their being well below the mandatory retirement age; they were susceptible to such treatment in part because they were not on the board. Hewitt and the board also rationalised the Air Force List of officers and their seniority that had become a source of irregularities owing to the many temporary and acting promotions granted during the war; this left several officers of senior rank demoted as many as three levels, such as group captain to flight lieutenant, in the first post-war List released in June 1947.

Despite acknowledging that the employment of women in the Air Force was an important factor in reducing "antagonism and prejudice" against them in the workplace in general, Hewitt recommended disbandment of the WAAAF; this was endorsed by the Air Board and by March 1947 all of the service's members had been discharged. Subsequent shortages of male personnel forced Jones and the board to reconsider this decision and recommend the establishment of a new women's service, leading to the formation of the Women's Royal Australian Air Force (WRAAF) in November 1950. In contrast to the situation for WAAAF members, who were paid two-thirds of the RAAF rates of pay for the same jobs, the board recommended that recruits to the new women's organisation receive the same rates of pay as their male counterparts. The Australian government did not concur, and WRAAF members could not expect to earn more than two-thirds the pay of males. As AMP Hewitt was also responsible for establishing a post-war RAAF reserve contingent, including CAF squadrons for home defence so that permanent forces were able to deploy overseas as necessary. From September 1950 to January 1961, the Air Board was augmented by a CAF Member.

Wackett sought to establish technical services as a distinct department within the RAAF, rather than forming part of the Supply Branch as in previous years. In March 1946 he gained the Air Board's approval for a Technical Branch, which was formed under his leadership in September 1948. This led to a separate listing of engineering personnel, as opposed to the earlier Technical List subgroup under the General Duties Branch. Wackett was disappointed by the limits imposed by the Air Board on career advancement for his personnel: the General Duties Branch in the late 1940s was permitted to maintain thirty-seven officer positions of group captain and above, but the Technical Branch was only allowed fourteen such slots, even though both departments had an almost identical overall strength of just under 400 staff; the anomaly led Wackett to submit a dissenting report on the subject to the Air Board. In October 1949, Wackett's title was changed from Air Member for Equipment and Maintenance to Air Member for Technical Services (AMTS). The board renamed the Technical Services Branch the Engineering Branch in 1966.

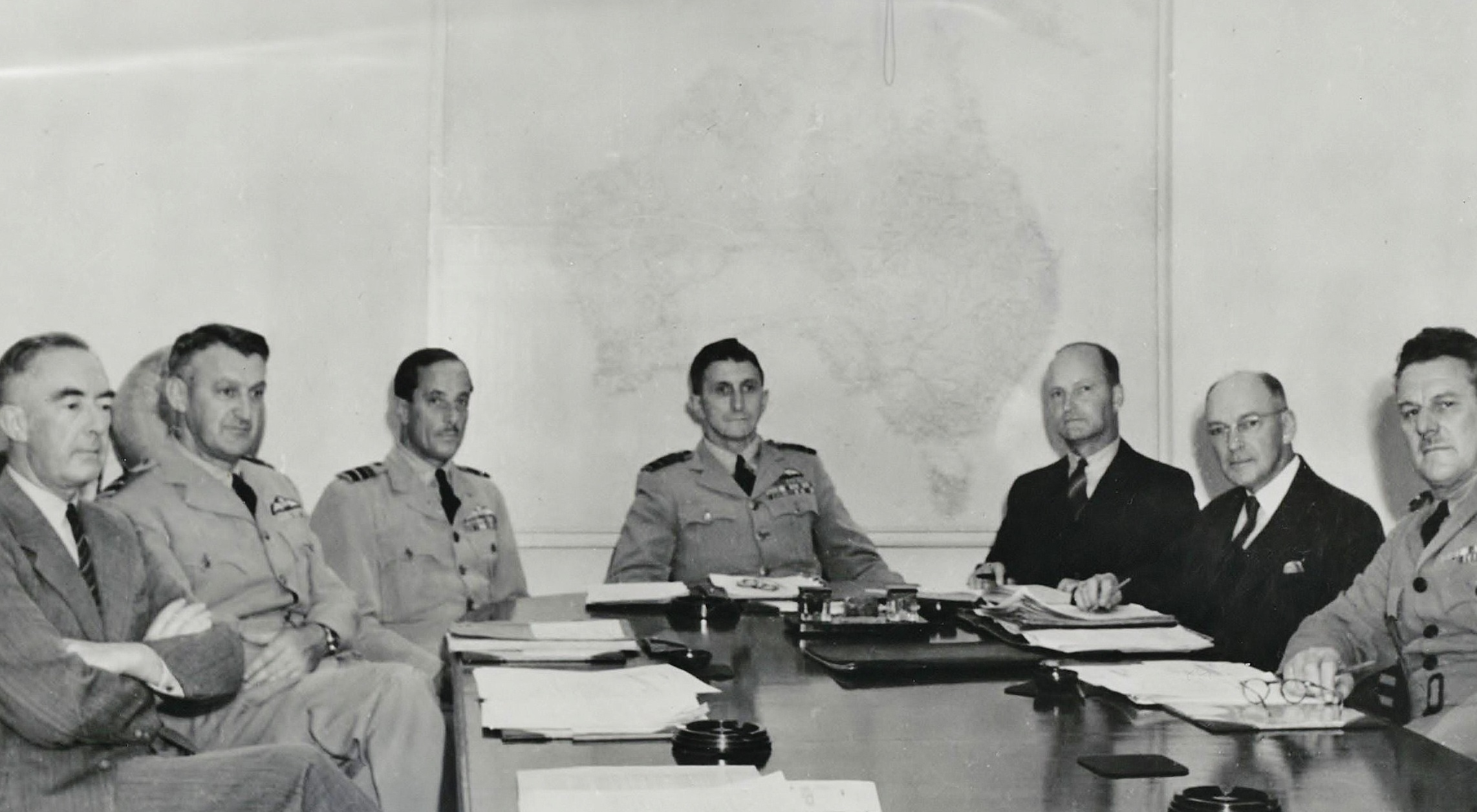
Air Board meeting, June 1946. Left to right: W.L. Brown (Finance Member); Air Vice-Marshal E.C. Wackett (Air Member for Engineering and Maintenance); Air Vice-Marshal J.E. Hewitt (Air Member for Personnel); Air Marshal G. Jones (Chief of the Air Staff); F.J. Mulrooney (Secretary), R.H. Nesbitt (Business Member); Air Vice-Marshal G.J. W. Mackinolty (Air Member for Supply and Equipment).

In the immediate post-war period, the Air Board was responsible for determining which of its aircraft and other equipment was surplus to requirements. The official post-war history notes that this included such things as "ten kilometres of fur fabric (used to line flying suits), three hundred kilometres of hessian, four hundred kilometres of canvas, 53,539 mosquito nets, 3,800,000 razor blades and 20,711 pairs of corsets". As AMSE, Mackinolty was solely responsible for disposing of surplus equipment up to an original value of £500, and jointly responsible with the BM and FM for disposing of items valued between £500 and £10,000. Equipment worth more than £10,000 required the approval of the full Air Board and the Board of Business Administration in the Department of Defence. The position of Business Member was dropped from the Air Board in January 1948. Mackinolty died after a short illness in February 1951, and Hewitt took over as AMSE.

==== Cold War commitments ====
Despite the major reductions in personnel and equipment in the immediate post-war period, the Air Force was soon committed to a series of overseas ventures in concert with its Cold War allies. In March 1946, No. 81 (Fighter) Wing deployed to Japan as part of the British Commonwealth Air Group (BCAIR), the air component of the British Commonwealth Occupation Force. No. 81 Wing's commander was responsible to BCAIR for duties related to the occupation but could deal directly with Air Force Headquarters on RAAF personnel matters such as pay, postings, and promotions. The ten RAAF transport crews committed to the Berlin Airlift flew British aircraft under the control of No. 46 Group RAF. RAAF combat forces deployed in the Malayan Emergency were directed by the RAF and in the Korean War by United Nations Air Command headquarters. The Australian squadrons in Malaya were deployed as a composite RAAF formation, No. 90 Wing, owing to the personal intervention of the CAS, Air Marshal Jones, who was mindful of repeating the experience of World War II, when RAAF units and personnel based in Britain had been absorbed by the RAF, rather than operating as a national group led by high-ranking Australian officers. He informed the British Air Ministry of this requirement—without consulting the Australian government—and the Air Ministry acceded. RAAF squadrons in the Korean War were also grouped into a composite formation, No. 91 Wing. The Gloster Meteor jets flown in Korea were the first type in Australian service to be fitted with ejector seats; the Air Board soon ordered their employment in all high-performance RAAF aircraft. The RAAF had sought swept-wing North American F-86 Sabres for Korea in preference to the straight-wing Meteors but none were available at the time. When the Air Board proposed that CAC build the Sabre under licence in Australia the Minister for Air, Tommy White, initially rejected the notion, partly because he preferred British aircraft and also because he doubted the suitability of the proposed engine, the Rolls-Royce Nene. Jones arranged a phone conference for himself and White with the director of Rolls-Royce, who recommended using the Avon engine instead, and White subsequently agreed to procure what became the CAC Sabre.

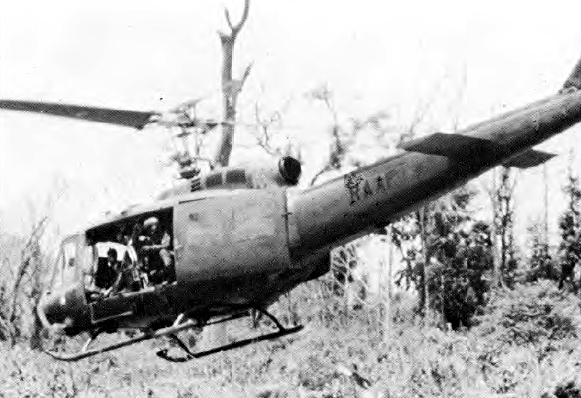
RAAF UH-1 Iroquois in Vietnam; the helicopters were used under fire at the Battle of Long Tan in 1966 despite Air Board directives to the contrary

When No. 78 (Fighter) Wing deployed to Malta to help garrison the Middle East during 1952–1954, it was under the operational control of the RAF rather than the Air Board, but the British Air Council undertook to inform the board of any plans for combat missions except in emergencies. The Air Board maintained full operational control of No. 79 Squadron when it deployed with Sabres to Ubon, Thailand, under SEATO arrangements in 1962. After United States Air Force (USAF) strike aircraft took up residence at Ubon in 1965 as part of operations in the Vietnam War, the RAAF fighters became responsible for protection of the American assets, in effect subjecting them to USAF tasking, despite the Air Board's ostensible authority.

Between 1965 and 1967, the Australian government committed three Air Force units for service in Vietnam: RAAF Transport Flight Vietnam (later No. 35 Squadron), operating DHC-4 Caribou transports; No. 9 Squadron, operating UH-1 Iroquois helicopters; and No. 2 Squadron, operating English Electric Canberra bombers. The Air Board selected Air Commodore Jack Dowling as deputy commander of Australian Forces Vietnam (AFV) and Group Captain Peter Raw as RAAF task force commander, choices the official post-war history of the Air Force found wanting as neither officer was experienced in land/air warfare operations. Dowling was responsible to the Air Board for the "local administration" of all RAAF units in Vietnam. The Caribous were tasked for pre-agreed roles by the USAF; the commanding officer was expected to seek permission from the Air Board for any mission outside his normal purview. The Canberras operated under the direction of the USAF as part of the 35th Tactical Fighter Wing. The Iroquois were controlled by the 1st Australian Task Force. The official post-war history described No. 9 Squadron's first three months in Vietnam as "an inter-service disaster" owing to the unit's lack of readiness. Air Board directives, "framed for peacetime flying" according to David Horner, initially precluded the Iroquois from operating in hostile conditions; the RAAF provided helicopter support for Australian troops during the Battle of Long Tan in August 1966 in spite of these directives. Although the RAAF Iroquois established a high level of safety and efficiency after their teething issues, the early problems remained in the forefront of Army thinking, and probably contributed to the Australian government's decision in 1986 to transfer control of battlefield helicopters from the Air Force to the Army.

==== Reorganising the Air Force ====
The RAAF underwent major organisational change under Jones' replacement as CAS, Air Marshal Sir Donald Hardman, RAF, between October 1953 and February 1954, when it transitioned from the wartime area command structure to a functional control system. This resulted in the establishment of Home (operational), Training, and Maintenance Commands. Some on the Air Board were unsure of the efficacy of a functional command system given the breadth of the country and the relatively small size of the RAAF, but Hardman had the support of the Minister for Air, William McMahon, and the board eventually ratified the structural changes. Hardman had also observed that the terms "Air Board" and "Air Force Headquarters" (whose staff numbered over 1,300) were used synonymously to describe the RAAF's highest authority. Finding the roles of the board, the headquarters and the department to be blurred, he directed that Air Force Headquarters be absorbed by the Department of Air, through which the Air Board would now control its assets. In 1954, the position of FM was supplanted by the Secretary of the Department of Air. The functional commands were revised in 1959. The board approved renaming Home Command to Operational Command, and merging Training and Maintenance Commands into Support Command. The Air Board reiterated that policies were the responsibility of the Department of Air, and implementing those policies the responsibility of the commands. The board and its staff progressively relocated from Melbourne to Russell Offices in Canberra between 1959 and 1961.

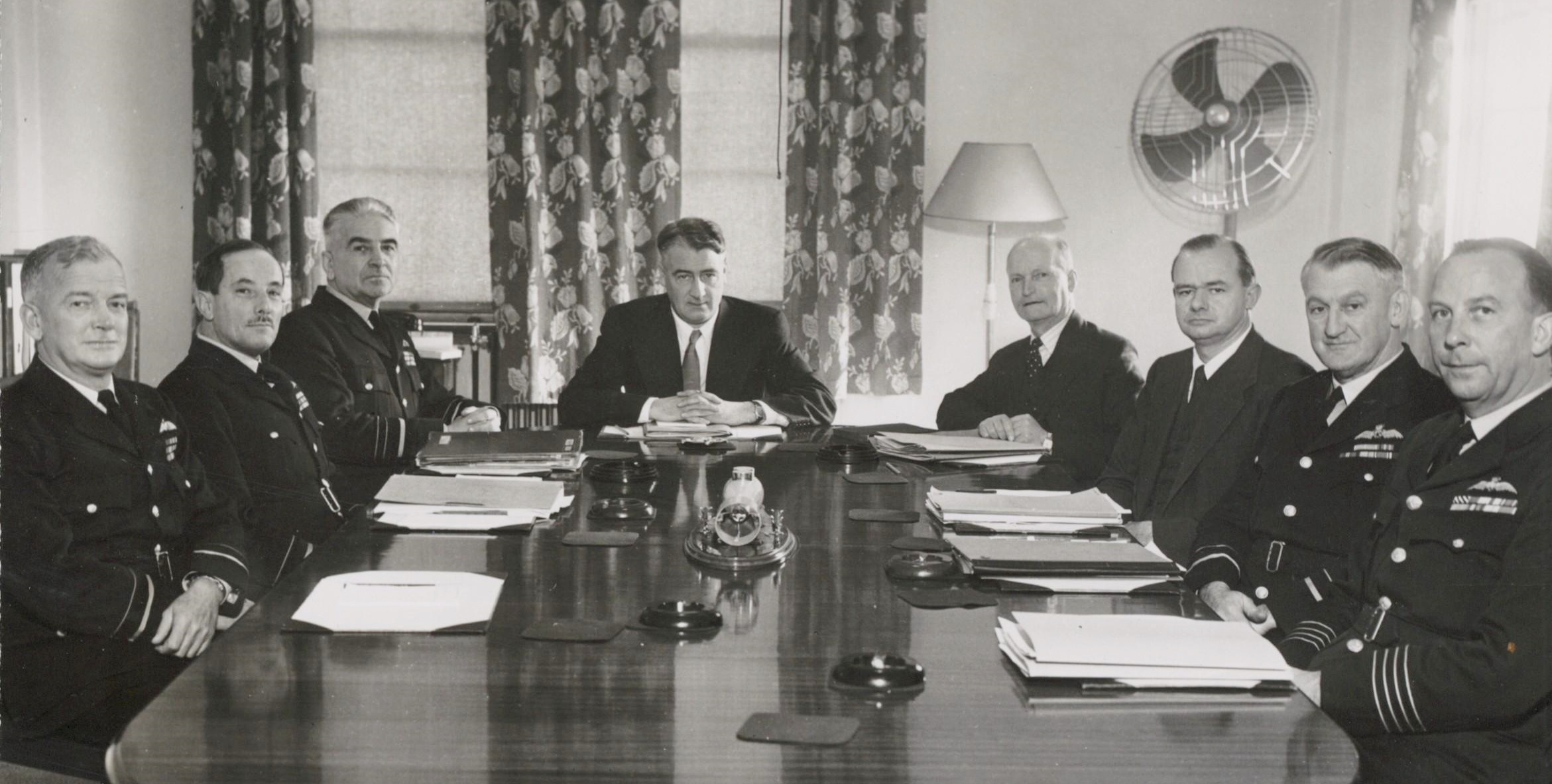
Air Board meeting, July 1955. From left: Air Vice-Marshal F.R.W. Scherger (Air Member for Personnel); Air Vice-Marshal J.E. Hewitt (Air Member for Supply and Equipment); Air Marshal J.P.J. McCauley (Chief of the Air Staff); A.G. Townley (Minister for Air); F.J. Mulrooney (Secretary to the Air Board); E.W. Hicks (Secretary of the Department of Air); Air Vice-Marshal E.C. Wackett (Air Member for Technical Services); Group Captain R.M. Rechner (Citizen Air Force Member).

Hardman had stressed to the Air Board in 1954 that "An air force without bombers isn't an air force", a tenet "held just as strongly by his successors" according to the official post-war history. In June 1963, to counteract a perceived threat from Indonesia out of which the Labor opposition was making political capital in the run-up to a Federal election, Prime Minister Menzies instructed the CAS, Air Marshal Sir Val Hancock, to investigate replacements for the Canberra. Although finding the US TFX, forerunner of the General Dynamics F-111, the most suitable aircraft, he recommended purchase of the already operational North American A-5 Vigilante as the simplest way to satisfy the requirement. The Air Board and the Minister for Air, David Fairbairn, endorsed Hancock's recommendation but Cabinet over-ruled them and the Minister for Defence, Athol Townley, negotiated a deal for twenty-four F-111s without consulting Hancock or the Air Board; Menzies announced the decision in October. In September 1966 the board considered an array of names—many of them Aboriginal in origin—for the new bomber, eventually deciding that "F-111" ("F-one-eleven") alone had "a certain amount of appeal, enhanced to a good extent by usage". Much of the board's time over the following years was occupied with issues of structural fatigue and losses of USAF aircraft that delayed the F-111's introduction to Australian service until 1973. In the interim, the Air Board supported a proposal by the Minister for Defence, Malcolm Fraser, to lease twenty-four McDonnell Douglas F-4E Phantoms; the board felt constrained to reiterate its ongoing commitment to the F-111, issuing a statement that the aircraft would "meet the RAAF operational requirement more effectively than the F-4E by a decisive margin".

In 1971 the Air Board presided over celebrations for the RAAF's fiftieth anniversary, which included several air displays, a commemorative book, and the commissioning of an Air Force Memorial in Canberra. The board also decided to do away with the RAAF's dark-blue winter and khaki summer uniforms in favour of an all-purpose blue-grey suit. This proved unpopular and Williams' original winter uniform design was reintroduced in 2000. In October 1975, the Air Board considered the findings of a Defence working party reviewing conditions for women in the armed services. As a result, the board decreed that a common rank structure should apply in the RAAF and the WRAAF, and that WRAAF members should have the same powers of command and discipline over male as well as female air force personnel; previously WRAAF members (and WAAAF members during World War II) had powers of command only over other servicewomen. The board also expanded the range of musterings available to women, though it continued to exclude them from combat duties.

==== Dissolution ====
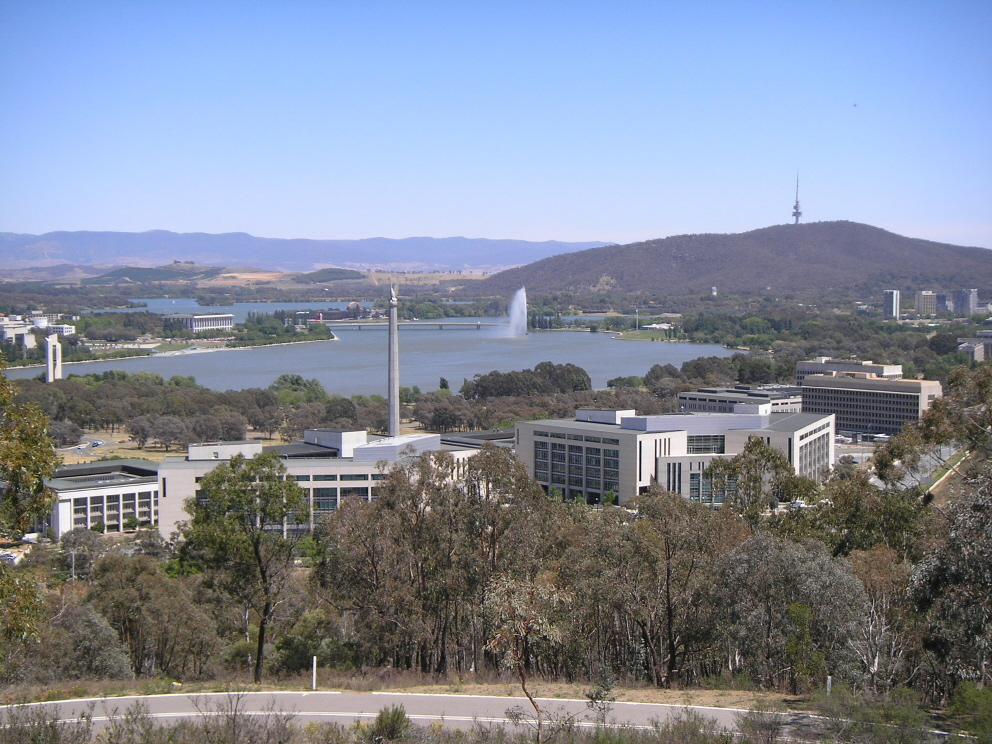
Russell Offices, Canberra (pictured in 2006), home of the Air Board from 1961 until its dissolution in 1976

The Departments of Air, Army and Navy merged with the Department of Defence in November 1973 as part of a rationalisation plan formulated by the Secretary of Defence, Sir Arthur Tange. According to the official history of the RAAF from 1972 to 1996, Tange had found the three service departments, the Department of Supply, and the central Department of Defence to be riven with "tribalism and entrenched attitudes", and the service boards, each reporting to their own minister, to be "laws unto themselves". The Air Board became responsible to the Minister for Defence, and the civilian member of the Air Board, the Secretary of Air, became the Special Deputy of the Permanent Head, Defence (Air Office). As a further consequence of Tange's plan, in 1976 the Army, Navy and Air Force chiefs were given individual responsibility to command their respective services, under the direction of the newly inaugurated Chief of the Defence Force Staff. This made the service boards redundant. The Air Board held its final meeting on 30 January 1976, and was dissolved on 9 February, along with the Military and Naval Boards.

The incumbent CAS, Air Marshal James Rowland, became the first officer to personally command the RAAF in a legal sense. A new Chief of the Air Staff Advisory Committee (CASAC) was set up to develop policy and oversee administration, but there was no requirement for the CAS to accept its advice. Chaired by the CAS, CASAC comprised the Deputy CAS, the Chief of Air Force Plans, the Chief of Air Force Manpower, the Chief of Technical Services, and the Director-General of Supply. According to Alan Stephens, Rowland considered that the Air Board's "collective wisdom" had been generally beneficial to the RAAF, and believed the new arrangements led to "'paralysis and arrogation of decision making', and empire building in the Public Service component". Conversely, Rowland's successor as CAS, Air Marshal Sir Neville McNamara, endorsed the demise of the Air Board, finding that it had, in Stephens' words, "tended to perpetuate Branch enmities and divisions within the Air Force".

== Members ==
Position	Appointed	Member
Director of Intelligence and Organisation; Position superseded by CAS in 1922	1920	Lieutenant Colonel (later Wing Commander) R. Williams
Director of Personnel and Training; Position superseded by Chief of the Administrative Staff in 1922	1920	Wing Commander S.J. Goble
Director of Personnel and Training; Position superseded by Chief of the Administrative Staff in 1922	1921	Squadron Leader W.H. Anderson
Director of Equipment; Position abolished in 1922	1920	Captain (later Squadron Leader) P.A. McBain
Finance Member; Position superseded by Secretary of the Department of Air in 1954	1920	A.C. Joyce
Finance Member; Position superseded by Secretary of the Department of Air in 1954	1932	T.J. Thomas
Finance Member; Position superseded by Secretary of the Department of Air in 1954	1936	M.C. Langslow
Finance Member; Position superseded by Secretary of the Department of Air in 1954	1940	C.V. Kellway
Finance Member; Position superseded by Secretary of the Department of Air in 1954	1941	H.C. Elvins
Finance Member; Position superseded by Secretary of the Department of Air in 1954	1946	W.L. Brown (acting)
Finance Member; Position superseded by Secretary of the Department of Air in 1954	1951	J.N. Andrews (acting)
Finance Member; Position superseded by Secretary of the Department of Air in 1954	1952	E.W. Hicks
Chief of the Air Staff (CAS)	1922	Wing Commander R. Williams
Chief of the Air Staff (CAS)	1922	Wing Commander S.J. Goble
Chief of the Air Staff (CAS)	1925	Wing Commander (later Air Commodore) R. Williams
Chief of the Air Staff (CAS)	1932	Air Commodore S.J. Goble
Chief of the Air Staff (CAS)	1934	Air Commodore (later Air Vice-Marshal) R. Williams (also AMP 1935)
Chief of the Air Staff (CAS)	1939	Air Vice-Marshal S.J. Goble
Chief of the Air Staff (CAS)	1940	Air Commodore W.H. Anderson (acting)
Chief of the Air Staff (CAS)	1940	Air Chief Marshal Sir C.S. Burnett, RAF
Chief of the Air Staff (CAS)	1942	Air Vice-Marshal (later Air Marshal) G. Jones (also AMOE 1942)
Chief of the Air Staff (CAS)	1952	Air Marshal Sir J.D.I. Hardman, RAF
Chief of the Air Staff (CAS)	1954	Air Marshal Sir J.P.J. McCauley
Chief of the Air Staff (CAS)	1957	Air Marshal Sir F.R.W. Scherger
Chief of the Air Staff (CAS)	1961	Air Marshal Sir V.E. Hancock
Chief of the Air Staff (CAS)	1965	Air Marshal Sir A.M. Murdoch
Chief of the Air Staff (CAS)	1970	Air Marshal Sir C.T. Hannah
Chief of the Air Staff (CAS)	1972	Air Marshal C.F. Read
Chief of the Air Staff (CAS)	1975	Air Marshal J.A. Rowland
Chief of the Administrative Staff; Position superseded by AMP in 1927	1922	Squadron Leader W.H. Anderson
Chief of the Administrative Staff; Position superseded by AMP in 1927	1925	Wing Commander S.J. Goble
Chief of the Administrative Staff; Position superseded by AMP in 1927	1925	Wing Commander W.H. Anderson
Chief of the Administrative Staff; Position superseded by AMP in 1927	1926	Wing Commander A.T. Cole
Chief of the Administrative Staff; Position superseded by AMP in 1927	1926	Wing Commander R.S. Brown
Air Member for Personnel (AMP)	1927	Wing Commander (later Group Captain) S.J. Goble
Air Member for Personnel (AMP)	1933	Group Captain W.H. Anderson
Air Member for Personnel (AMP)	1934	Air Commodore S.J. Goble
Air Member for Personnel (AMP)	1935	Air Commodore H.R. Nicholl, RAF
Air Member for Personnel (AMP)	1938	Air Commodore S.J. Goble
Air Member for Personnel (AMP)	1939	Air Commodore J.C. Russell, RAF
Air Member for Personnel (AMP)	1940	Air Commodore W.H. Anderson
Air Member for Personnel (AMP)	1940	Air Commodore (later Air Vice-Marshal) H.N. Wrigley
Air Member for Personnel (AMP)	1942	Air Commodore F.W.F. Lukis
Air Member for Personnel (AMP)	1943	Air Vice-Marshal W.H. Anderson
Air Member for Personnel (AMP)	1944	Air Vice-Marshal A.T. Cole
Air Member for Personnel (AMP)	1945	Air Commodore F.R.W. Scherger
Air Member for Personnel (AMP)	1945	Air Commodore (later Air Vice-Marshal) J.E. Hewitt
Air Member for Personnel (AMP)	1948	Air Vice-Marshal F.M. Bladin
Air Member for Personnel (AMP)	1953	Air Vice-Marshal V.E. Hancock
Air Member for Personnel (AMP)	1955	Air Vice-Marshal W.L. Hely
Air Member for Personnel (AMP)	1955	Air Vice-Marshal F.R.W. Scherger
Air Member for Personnel (AMP)	1957	Air Commodore F. Headlam
Air Member for Personnel (AMP)	1957	Air Vice-Marshal A.L. Walters
Air Member for Personnel (AMP)	1959	Air Commodore F. Headlam
Air Member for Personnel (AMP)	1960	Air Vice-Marshal W.L. Hely
Air Member for Personnel (AMP)	1966	Air Vice-Marshal C.D. Candy
Air Member for Personnel (AMP)	1969	Air Vice-Marshal B.A. Eaton
Air Member for Personnel (AMP)	1973	Air Vice-Marshal K.S. Hennock
Air Member for Personnel (AMP)	1975	Air Vice-Marshal J.C. Jordan
Air Member for Supply; Position superseded by DGSP in 1940	1929	Wing Commander (later Group Captain) W.H. Anderson
Air Member for Supply; Position superseded by DGSP in 1940	1933	Wing Commander (later Group Captain) A.T. Cole
Air Member for Supply; Position superseded by DGSP in 1940	1936	Group Captain (later Air Commodore) W.H. Anderson
Air Member for Organisation and Equipment (AMOE); Position superseded by AMSE/AMEM in 1942	1940	Air Marshal R. Williams
Air Member for Organisation and Equipment (AMOE); Position superseded by AMSE/AMEM in 1942	1941	Air Vice-Marshal W.H. Anderson
Director-General of Supply and Production (DGSP); Position superseded by AMSE/AMEM in 1942	1940	R. Lawson
Business Member; Position abolished in 1948	1940	W.S. Jones
Business Member; Position abolished in 1948	1944	R.H. Nesbitt
Air Member for Supply and Equipment (AMSE)	1942	Air Commodore (later Air Vice-Marshal) G.J.W. Mackinolty
Air Member for Supply and Equipment (AMSE)	1951	Air Vice-Marshal J.E. Hewitt
Air Member for Supply and Equipment (AMSE)	1956	Air Vice-Marshal H.G. Acton
Air Member for Supply and Equipment (AMSE)	1960	Air Vice-Marshal D.A.J. Creal
Air Member for Supply and Equipment (AMSE)	1964	Air Vice-Marshal I.D. McLachlan
Air Member for Supply and Equipment (AMSE)	1968	Air Vice-Marshal C.G. Cleary
Air Member for Supply and Equipment (AMSE)	1973	Air Vice-Marshal L.J.K. Holten
Air Member for Supply and Equipment (AMSE)	1975	Air Vice-Marshal S.R. White
Air Member for Engineering and Maintenance (AMEM); Position superseded by AMTS in 1949	1942	Air Commodore E.C. Wackett
Air Member for Technical Services (AMTS)	1949	Air Vice-Marshal E.C. Wackett
Air Member for Technical Services (AMTS)	1960	Air Vice-Marshal E. Hey
Air Member for Technical Services (AMTS)	1972	Air Vice-Marshal J.A. Rowland
Air Member for Technical Services (AMTS)	1975	Air Vice-Marshal L.S. Compton
Citizen Air Force Member; Position abolished in 1961	1950	Group Captain J.L. Waddy
Citizen Air Force Member; Position abolished in 1961	1954	Group Captain R.M. Rechner
Secretary of the Department of Air; Position superseded by Special Deputy of Permanent Head, Defence (Air Office), in 1973	1951	E.W. Hicks
Secretary of the Department of Air; Position superseded by Special Deputy of Permanent Head, Defence (Air Office), in 1973	1956	A.B. McFarlane
Secretary of the Department of Air; Position superseded by Special Deputy of Permanent Head, Defence (Air Office), in 1973	1968	F.J. Green
Special Deputy of Permanent Head, Defence (Air Office)	1973	F.J. Green

== See also ==
- Air Board (Canada)
