= Cecil Gribble =

Australian Christian minister

The Reverend Cecil Gribble OBE
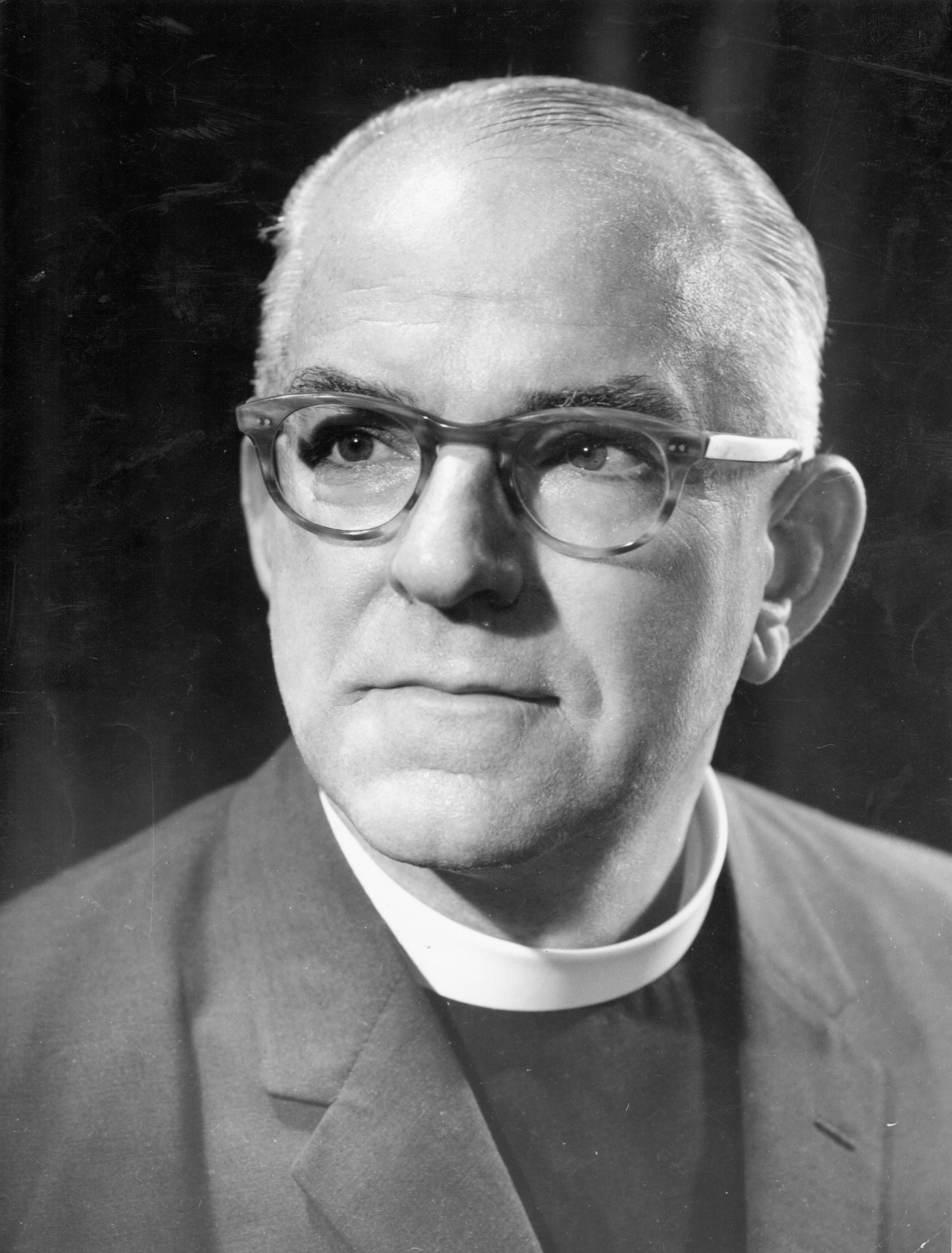
- Gribble in 1962
- Born: Cecil Frank Gribble; 12 June 1903; Ballarat, Victoria, Australia
- Died: 15 September 1995 (aged 92); Taiwan
- Education: Queen's College (University of Melbourne)
- Occupation: Christian minister
- Awards: Order of the British Empire (1958)

Cecil Frank Gribble (12 June 1903 – 15 September 1995) was an Australian Christian minister who was President General of the General Conference of the Methodist Church of Australasia 1964–1966.

== Early life and education ==
Cecil Frank Gribble was born on 12 June 1903 in Ballarat, Victoria, and trained as a pharmaceutical chemist.

In 1924 he was accepted as a candidate for ministry and attended the University of Melbourne's Queen's College. He graduated with an MA (Hons) in 1931 and was ordained.

== Career ==
After graduating, Gribble was appointed to Central Australia.

He was then posted to congregations in Victoria and Tasmania, and then in 1939 to Tonga. From 1939 until 1942 Gribble was principal of Tupou College, and then from 1943 until 1945 he was Director of Education in Tonga, appointed by Queen Salote.

Returning to Australia in 1946, he was appointed assistant secretary general of the Methodist Overseas Mission (MOM), and then in 1949 promoted to secretary general, a post he held until 1972. He continued to regularly visit Tonga.

In 1958 he was the Australian representative at the World Conference of the International Missionary Council. In 1961 he was a delegate to the World Assemblies of the World Council of Churches at New Delhi, India.

In 1963, Gribble pitted himself against Edgar Wells, the superintendent of Yirrkala mission in Arnhem Land, in the matter of land rights for the Yolngu people of the Gove Peninsula, in the matter which led to the Yirrkala bark petitions. Gribble had agreed to bauxite mining on land which included part of mission land, against the wishes of the people, assuring the Minister for Territories, Paul Hasluck, that they had agreed to the conditions (when in fact they had not been properly consulted). At the 1963 General Conference of the Methodist Church, a triennial event, this time held in Adelaide, South Australia, Gribble was elected president general of the Methodist Church. This was a venerated role, which he would hold at the same time as being secretary general of the MOM. At this conference, there was a resolution passed to conduct an inquiry into land rights for Aboriginal people at Yirrkala in particular, but also throughout the country. There was another resolution passed to fight to regain the two-mile mission boundary, that Gribble himself had conceded to mining interests, much to Wells' disgust. John D. Jago, convenor of the Methodist Commission on Aboriginal Affairs, had proposed this resolution. Gribble recalled Wells from Yirrkala over the affair at the end of 1963.

In 1968 Gribble was once again a delegate at the World Assemblies of the WCC, this time at Uppsala, Sweden.

From 1974 until 1995 he was a supernumerary in Sydney.

== Other roles ==
Gribble was chairman of the Executive Committee of Newington College Council in 1964 and 1965.

== Family and death ==
Gribble married to Isabel Overend, the daughter of the Rev. and Mrs H.A. Overend, in 1933. His wife predeceased him in 1985. They had two sons and one daughter.

Gribble retired to Dee Why, a Northern Beaches suburb of Sydney. He died on 15 September 1995 while travelling in Taiwan, and was buried in Tonga. The Uniting Church in Australia parish at Dee Why is named in his honour, as "Cecil Gribble Tongan Congregation of the Uniting Church".

== Honours ==
- 1958: Officer of the Order of the British Empire (OBE)

Preceded by Robert H. Nesbitt	Chairman; Newington College Council; 1964–1965	Succeeded by A.D.G. Stewart
