= Ellis Wackett =

Royal Australian Air Force senior engineer (1901–1984)

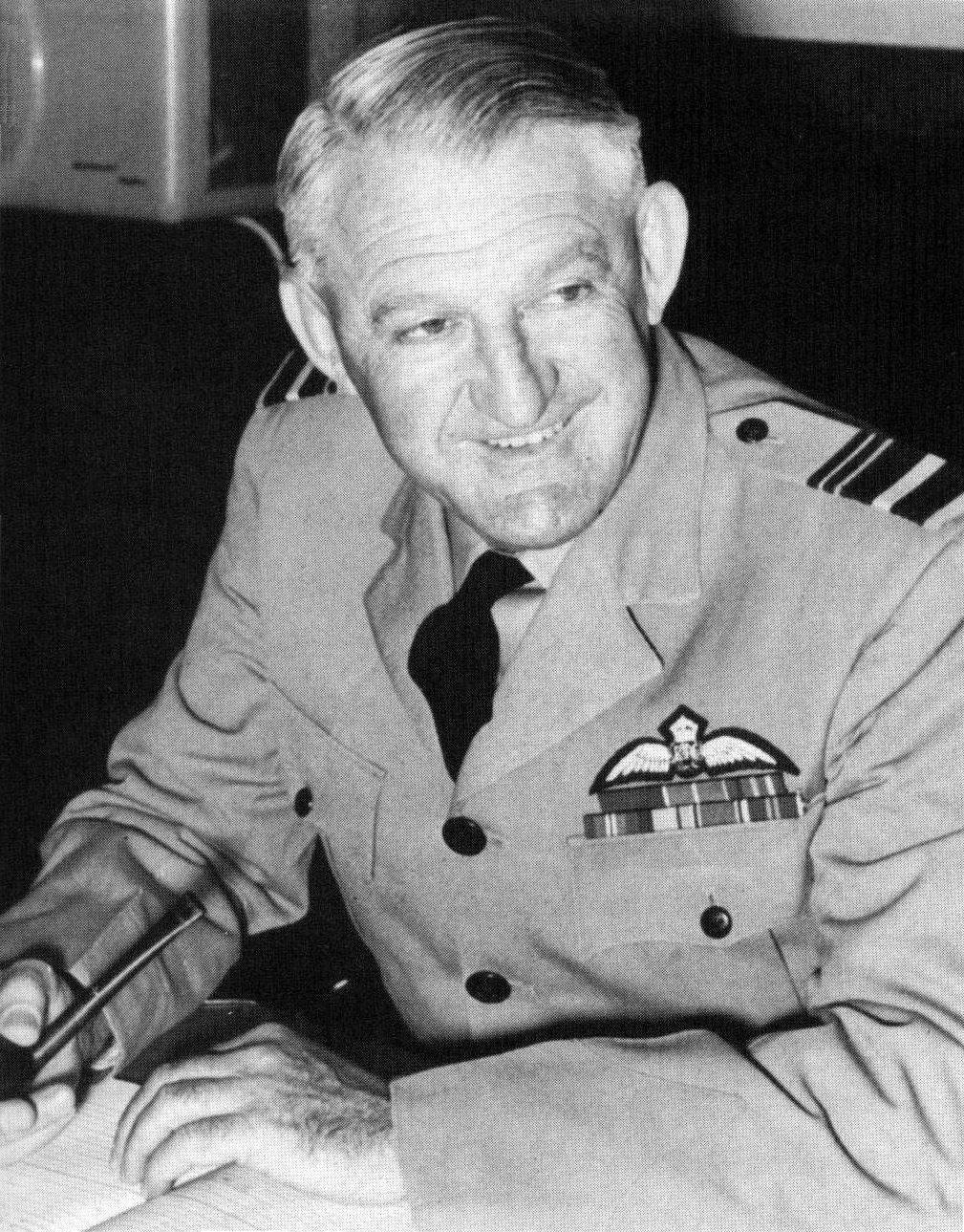
- Air Vice-Marshal Wackett, c. 1958
- Born: 13 August 1901; Townsville, Queensland
- Died: 3 August 1984 (aged 82); Warracknabeal, Victoria
- Relatives: Lawrence Wackett (brother)
- Military career
- Allegiance: Australia
- Branch: Royal Australian Navy; Royal Australian Air Force
- Service years: 1914–59
- Rank: Air Vice-Marshal
- Nicknames: "Wack"; "EC"; "Punch"
- Commands: Papuan Survey Flight (1927–28); Technical Services (1935–42); Engineering & Maintenance (1942–48); Technical Branch (1948–59)
- Conflicts: World War II
- Awards: Companion of the Order of the Bath; Commander of the Order of the British Empire
- Other work: Member, Australian National Airlines Commission (1960–68)

Air Vice-Marshal Ellis Charles Wackett, CB, CBE (13 August 1901 – 3 August 1984) was a senior commander in the Royal Australian Air Force (RAAF). Its chief engineer from 1935 to 1959, he served on the RAAF's controlling body, the Air Board, for a record seventeen years, and has been credited with infusing operations with new standards of airworthiness. Commencing his service career as a Royal Australian Navy cadet during World War I, Wackett transferred to the Air Force in 1923 while on an engineering course in Britain. He qualified as a pilot before completing his studies and returning to Australia, where he inaugurated parachute instruction within the RAAF and made the country's first freefall descent from a military aircraft in 1926. The following year, he led a three-month survey flight to Papua New Guinea.

Wackett became the RAAF's senior engineer with his appointment as Director of Technical Services in 1935. A wing commander at the outbreak of World War II, he rose to air commodore by 1942 and assumed the role of Air Member for Engineering and Maintenance. He established the Technical Branch as a separate department of the RAAF in 1948, and was promoted to air vice-marshal the same year. Wackett served as Air Member for Technical Services until leaving the military in 1959, having been appointed Commander of the Order of the British Empire and Companion of the Order of the Bath. From 1960 to 1968, he was a member of the Australian National Airlines Commission, parent of Trans Australia Airlines. Generally known as "Wack", or "EC" (to distinguish him from his elder brother, aircraft designer Lawrence James Wackett or "LJ"), his prominent chin and nose also earned him the nickname "Punch".

== Early career ==
Born on 13 August 1901 in Townsville, Queensland, Ellis Wackett was the third and youngest child of James, an English-born storekeeper, and Alice Wackett (née Lawrence). Following schooling in Townsville, he entered the Royal Australian Naval College at Jervis Bay, New South Wales, in 1914, aged thirteen. Graduating in 1918, he served as a midshipman aboard the Royal Navy battleship HMS Monarch and battlecruiser HMS Renown, and later the RAN light cruiser HMAS Brisbane and battlecruiser HMAS Australia. He was commissioned a sub-lieutenant in January 1921, and posted to England for study in July. Wackett was at the Royal Naval Engineering College, Keyham, when he applied to join the Royal Australian Air Force (RAAF) in 1922. Accepted by the Air Force the following year, he finished at Keyham in August and trained as a pilot on Salisbury Plain. He then took a one-year post-graduate course in aeronautics at the Imperial College of Science and Technology, London, before returning to Australia to take up his service as a flying officer with the RAAF.

Wackett's first role was to establish parachute instruction within the Air Force. His trip home from England had been postponed at the last minute to enable him to be trained; he began instructing volunteers in 1926 at RAAF Station Richmond, New South Wales, and made Australia's first freefall descent from a military aircraft—an Airco DH.9—on 26 May. The Chief of the Air Staff, Group Captain Richard Williams, himself made a successful jump on 5 August, to set "a good example" before making the wearing of parachutes compulsory for all aircrew. On 21 August, Wackett piloted the DH.9 from which Flying Officer Frederick Scherger made the first public display of parachuting in Australia, at Essendon, Victoria.

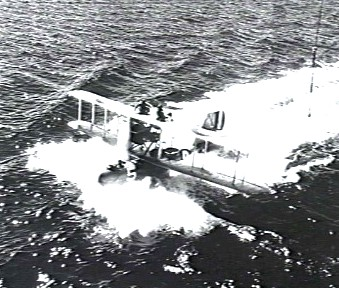
The Supermarine Seagull III, serial A9–5, that Wackett flew on his Papuan Survey Flight in 1927

By August 1927, Wackett had been promoted flight lieutenant and given command of the Papuan Survey Flight formed at RAAF Station Laverton, Victoria. Consisting of two Supermarine Seagull III single-engined amphibious biplanes and six aircrew, the flight was to examine and photograph the Papuan and New Guinean coasts as far north as Aitape and, if possible, Bougainville. Stripped of all equipment considered non-essential—including radio sets—to increase range, the aircraft departed on 27 September and journeyed some 17,700 kilometres (11,000 mi), covering almost 130,000 square kilometres (50,000 mi^{2}) of country and taking 350 photos. Wackett's machine (serial A9-5) returned to Melbourne on 26 December and the other (A9–6) on 19 January 1928. Inclement weather prevented the expedition from reaching Bougainville, and thick jungle cover limited the usefulness of its photographic record. Nevertheless, the Air Force learned valuable lessons concerning the Seagull's capabilities in a potential wartime role, as it was found to be unsuited to operations in the tropics.

On 14 August 1928, Wackett married Doreen Dove in Melbourne; they had two sons and a daughter. In 1933, Wackett was posted to England to attend RAF Staff College, Andover. Returning to Australia, he was promoted to squadron leader and became Director of Technical Services, an organisation within the RAAF's Supply Branch, in May 1935; the appointment made Wackett the Air Force's senior engineer. The same year, he took charge of the Resources Committee for Electrical Equipment, Scientific and Optical Instruments, one of several subcommittees on the federal government's Defence Resources Board set up to investigate and report on the readiness of Australian industry to provide munitions for defence in the event of international conflict.

== World War II ==
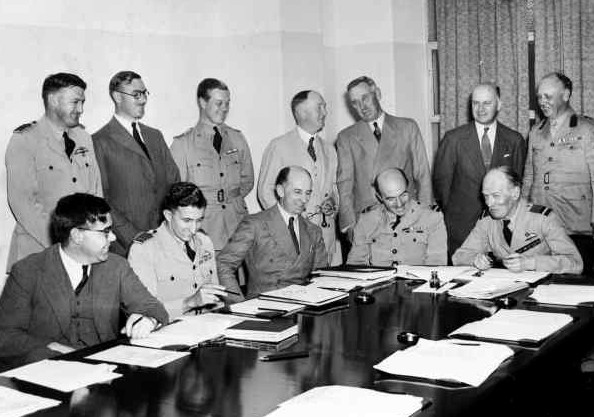
Group Captain Wackett, Director of Technical Services (standing, far left), with members of the RAAF Flying Personnel Medical Research Committee, including Group Captain George Jones, Director of Training (seated, second left), and Air Chief Marshal Sir Charles Burnett, Chief of the Air Staff (seated, far right), c. 1941

Ranked wing commander at the outbreak of World War II, Wackett immediately faced major supply challenges in his role as Director of Technical Services. Spare parts for the RAAF's mainly British-built equipment were now in short supply, a fact complicated by the infancy of the local aircraft industry and a US arms embargo. His directorate made whatever use it could of civilian repair facilities, setting up recovery depots to salvage spares from damaged aircraft and other equipment. He also drew on the advice and support of his brother Lawrence, who had established the RAAF's technical services organisation in the 1920s and, having retired from the Air Force, headed the Commonwealth Aircraft Corporation (CAC). By late 1940, Wackett had been promoted temporary group captain, and joined the Flying Personnel Research Committee. Its members, drawn from the aviation, medical, scientific and technical disciplines, were to study and report upon such factors as aircrew safety, comfort, fatigue, survival, motion sickness, decompression and hypoxia.

Wackett was appointed an Officer of the Order of the British Empire in the 1941 New Year Honours. In June, he became the RAAF's representative on the federal Aircraft Advisory Committee, set up to assist the Director-General of Aircraft Production. As well as members from governmental and scientific bodies, the committee included delegates from aircraft manufacturers such as de Havilland Australia and CAC, Lawrence Wackett acting as Chief Technical Advisor. Later that year, the two brothers joined the academics on the newly formed Australian Council for Aeronautics, established by Prime Minister John Curtin to advise government, educational and scientific organisations on technical developments in the aircraft industry.

Raised to air commodore, Wackett was appointed the first Air Member for Engineering and Maintenance (AMEM) on 4 June 1942. As AMEM, he sat on the Air Board, the RAAF's controlling body, which consisted of its most senior officers and was chaired by the Chief of the Air Staff. Along with the new position of Air Member for Supply and Equipment, filled by Air Commodore George Mackinolty, AMEM had been created to replace the positions of Director-General of Supply and Production, a civilian post, and Air Member for Organisation and Equipment. Wackett would serve on the Air Board for the next seventeen years, a record tenure for the RAAF, his experience and intellect making him, in the words of Air Force historian Alan Stephens, "singularly adept at bringing a committee around to his point of view". During the war, the Air Board oversaw expansion from a complement in 1939 of 246 obsolescent machines such as CAC Wirraways, Avro Ansons and Lockheed Hudsons, to a strength in 1945 of 5,620 sophisticated aircraft including Supermarine Spitfires, P-51 Mustangs, de Havilland Mosquitoes and B-24 Liberators; to support this force, the RAAF had provided all-through training for 18,000 technical staff, and further education for 35,000 more schooled initially outside the service.

== Post-war career ==
Following the end of the war, Wackett contributed to "Plan D", the blueprint for restructuring the RAAF sponsored by the Chief of the Air Staff, Air Vice-Marshal George Jones. A major facet of Plan D, adopted in June 1947, was its encouragement of local industry to design and build military trainers and produce more sophisticated combat aircraft under licence from overseas manufacturers. This policy eventually led to the CAC Winjeel basic trainer and Australian co-partnership in production of the CAC Sabre jet fighter and GAF Canberra jet bomber. Wackett also supported Air Vice-Marshal Joe Hewitt, the Air Member for Personnel, in fostering apprenticeships as part of what Stephens considered the "education revolution" that took place in the RAAF during the late 1940s and early 1950s. The Apprentice Training Scheme, designed to raise the standard of technical roles in the Air Force, opened early in 1948 at the Ground Training School in RAAF Station Wagga, New South Wales, to provide education and technical training for youths aged fifteen to seventeen. By 1952, it had been renamed the RAAF School of Technical Training.

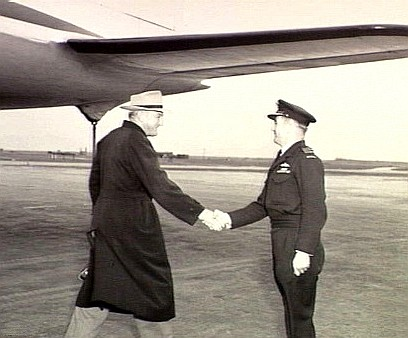
Air Vice-Marshal Wackett (left) greeted by Group Captain D.R. Chapman, Officer Commanding No. 91 (Composite) Wing RAAF, Iwakuni, Japan, April 1953

Wackett played a key role in establishing technical services as a distinct department within the RAAF, rather than forming part of the Supply Branch as in previous years. Mindful of the increasing responsibility that was being placed on scientific and technical resources in the modern Air Force, he had raised the question of a specialist engineering branch immediately after the war, and in March 1946 gained broad approval for its establishment. After eighteen months of work defining its scope and responsibilities, the Technical Branch was formed under Wackett's leadership on 23 September 1948, his goals being "to support the operational power of the RAAF by providing the most efficient technical organisation possible" and "to increase the effectiveness of air power through technical development". This in turn led to a separate "list" of engineering personnel, as opposed to the earlier Technical List subgroup under the General Duties Branch.

For flexibility, and to ensure that the flying and engineering branches had a better appreciation of their respective operations, Wackett supported the practice of some general duties officers continuing to perform engineering work, and as many technical officers as possible receiving secondary training as aircrew. He was disappointed by the limits imposed by the Air Board on career advancement for his personnel: the General Duties Branch in the late 1940s was permitted to maintain thirty-seven officer positions of group captain and above but the Technical Branch was allowed only fourteen such slots, though both departments had an almost identical overall strength of just under 400 staff. This anomaly led Wackett to submit a dissenting report on the subject to the Air Board, one of the few occasions a board member exercised his right to such a protest. His new organisation caused some other tensions in the RAAF: new airworthiness considerations frustrated pilots who found their flying time restricted by the introduction of more rigorous maintenance procedures; supply officers feared being "outshone" by the new status accorded to engineers; and so-called "black handers"—old-school technical officers who had risen through the ranks—regarded with disdain the prospect of an influx of "silly young blokes with degrees".

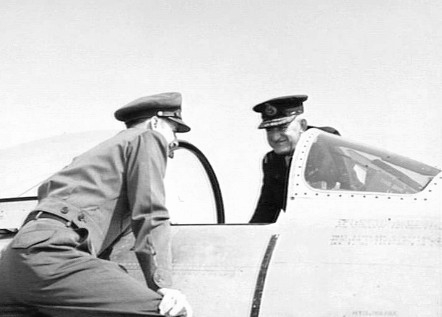
Wackett (right) in Korea during a visit to No. 77 Squadron RAAF, here inspecting a USAF F-86 Sabre at Kimpo in April 1953

Wackett had been promoted temporary air vice-marshal on 1 January 1947; this rank was made substantive following the formation of the Technical Branch. On 31 October 1949, his title was changed from Air Member for Equipment and Maintenance to Air Member for Technical Services (AMTS), in which capacity he would serve until his retirement from the RAAF in 1959. Appointed a Commander of the Order of the British Empire in the 1951 King's Birthday Honours, Wackett again worked closely with Air Vice-Marshal Hewitt, now the Air Member for Supply and Equipment, to introduce the concept of acquiring spare parts based on "life-of-type", whereby the forecast number and type of spares necessary for an aircraft's projected service life would be ordered when it was first deployed, to reduce costs and delivery time.

In 1953, Wackett established advanced diploma training for twenty-five airmen annually at Melbourne Technical College, the graduates receiving commissions as pilot officers. He also began recruiting university-qualified engineers to the Technical Branch, and put in place formal relationships with such bodies as CSIRO, the Council of Aeronautics (of which he was a member), Aeronautical Research Laboratories, and local aircraft manufacturers de Havilland Australia, Government Aircraft Factories, and CAC. He further initiated RAAF sponsorship of a chair of aeronautics at the University of Sydney. Wackett was appointed a Companion of the Order of the Bath in the 1957 New Year's Honours. Two years later, his wife Doreen was appointed a Member of the Order of the British Empire for her service as Vice President and, from 1948, President of the RAAF Women's Association.

== Later life and legacy ==
I have seen the aeroplane come from nothing to the dominant weapon of the last war. The piston engine took the aeroplane as far as possible subsonically. Now the missile challenges the aeroplane for supremacy.

— Ellis Wackett, 1959

When Wackett left the Air Force on 31 December 1959, he was its longest-serving officer. The next year he joined the Australian National Airlines Commission (ANAC), the controlling body of the federal government's domestic carrier, Trans Australia Airlines (TAA). He rose to the Vice Chairmanship of ANAC before retiring in 1968. During his term on the commission, Wackett witnessed the arrival of the Jet Age on domestic air routes; TAA took delivery of its first Boeing 727 in 1964, and its first Douglas DC-9 in 1967. He was also elected a fellow of the Royal Aeronautical Society. Like his brother Lawrence, who wrote two books on the subject, Ellis Wackett's chief hobby was angling. He died in Warracknabeal, Victoria, on 3 August 1984 and was cremated; his wife predeceased him in 1975.

For his commitment to the concept of airworthiness, as an attitude to quality and professionalism that went beyond simply whether aircraft were fit to fly or not, Wackett was described in the official history of the post-war Air Force as among the "outstanding officers of the post-war era". The establishment of a dedicated Technical Branch, which he founded in 1948, was a key factor in the RAAF developing the ability to successfully manage the maintenance and upgrade of such highly sophisticated aircraft as the General Dynamics F-111. Wackett's seventeen-year tenure on the Air Board, which was dissolved in 1976, remained the longest of any officer in the RAAF. He was followed by a series of leaders of the Technical Branch (renamed Engineering Branch in 1966) who shared his vision, including Air Vice-Marshals Ernie Hey (1960–1972) and James Rowland (1972–75). Wackett was among those considered as possible successors to Air Marshal George Jones as Chief of the Air Staff (CAS) when the latter was retired in 1952, but Prime Minister Robert Menzies's federal government chose an RAF officer for the role, Air Marshal Sir Donald Hardman. In any case, Air Force regulations at that time stipulated that appointees had to belong to the RAAF's General Duties (Aircrew) Branch. In 1975, Air Marshal Rowland was appointed as CAS, though he had to transfer from Engineering to General Duties before this could be formalised. The following year, the requirement for CAS to be a member of the General Duties Branch was removed.
