= Robert H. Nesbitt =

Australian Trade Commissioner to New Zealand (1883–1966)

Robert Henry Nesbitt
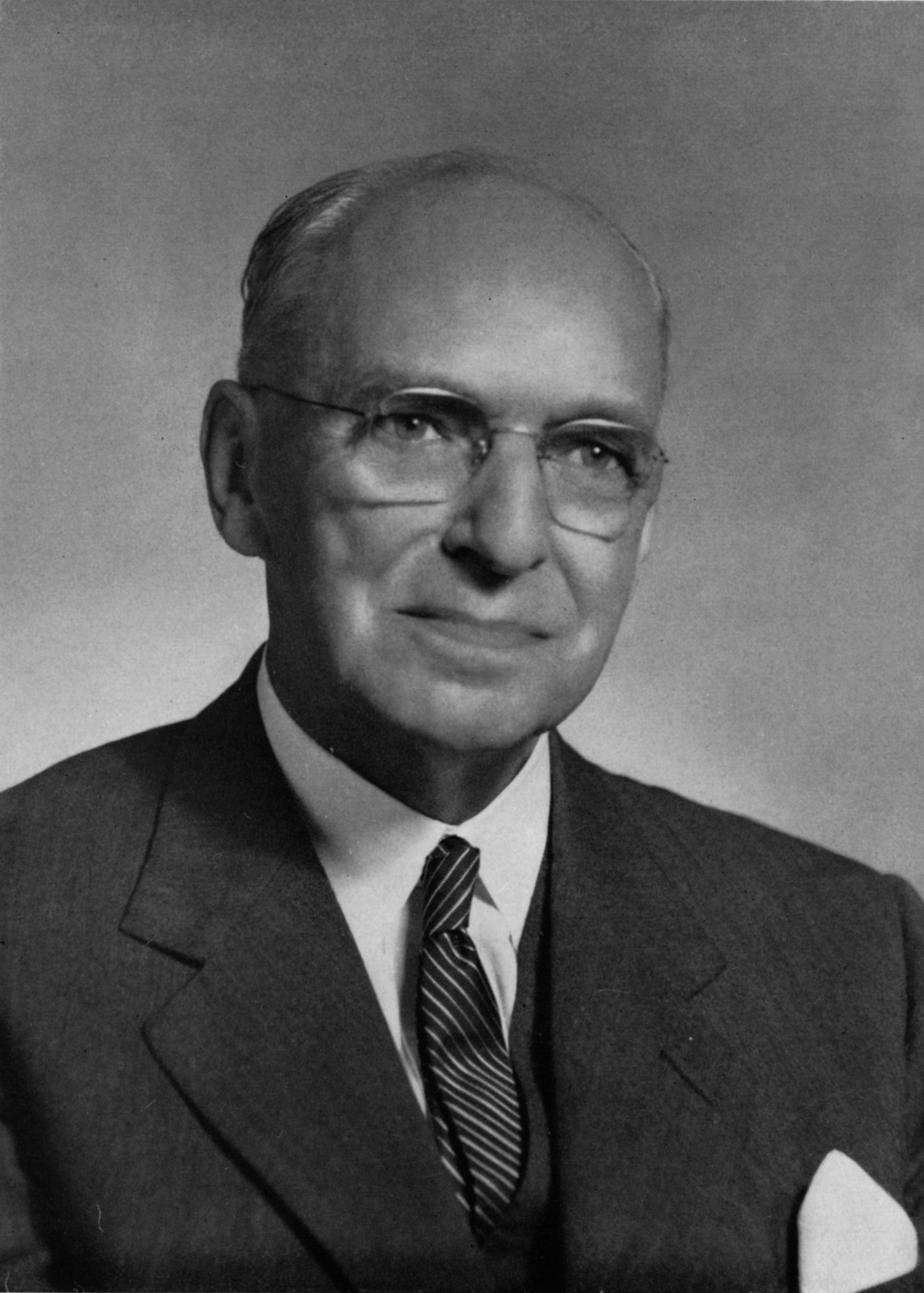

Australian Trade Commissioner to New Zealand
- In office 1934–1937
- Preceded by: Inaugural
- Succeeded by: Charles Critchley OBE

Personal details
- Born: 24 June 1883 Isle of Man
- Died: 29 June 1966 (aged 83) Double Bay, New South Wales
- Spouse: Ethel Lucie (née Murphy)
- Education: Balham Grammar School, London
- Occupation: Company secretary Accountant
- Profession: Trade diplomat

Robert Henry Nesbitt (1883–1966) was the first Australian Trade Commissioner to New Zealand and became chairman of the NSW Milk Board. During World War II he was the business member of the Air Board. He had extensive experience in the insurance industry and as a company secretary and accountant. Nesbit was an influential Methodist in New South Wales. He served as the Chairman of the Executive Committee of the Council of Newington College for two decades.

== Early life ==
Nesbit was born on the Isle of Man and educated in England. He emigrated to Australia in 1902 and settled in New South Wales.

== Trade Commissioner ==
Nesbitt was appointed Australian Trade Commissioner in Wellington, New Zealand, in 1934 and his primary task was to cultivate Australia and New Zealand trade. He managed the trade diversion issue and negotiated a number of sensitive issues of trade diplomacy. New Zealand had for many years imported fresh citrus and pineapples from Australia but, in 1932, it imposed an embargo. This was in part retaliation against the Australian prohibition on the import of New Zealand potatoes that had been in force for several years. In 1933, Walter Massy-Greene initiated a discussion on these matters and secured a partial lifting of the embargo. Nesbitt was responsible for continuing the negotiations, and for tackling issues such as New Zealand's duties being higher than the British preferential rate. There are only limited records of Nesbitt's time in New Zealand, but a measure of his effectiveness is indicated by the substantial growth in Australia–New Zealand trade in the mid-1930s and the avoidance of major trade disputes. In 1937, Nesbitt left the service to become chairman of the Milk Board of New South Wales.

== Methodist Church ==
The Methodist Church of Australasia was formed in 1902 when Nesbitt emigrated to Australia and he became an active member of that Christian denomination. In 1929 the General Conference appointed him to the position of Lay General Treasurer of the Methodist Missionary Society of Australasia. For 20 years prior to that time he worked with young people of the church and was Lay Treasurer of the Young People's Department of New South Wales. He was a Trustee of the Methodist Ladies' College in Burwood and Annesley Methodist Girls' College in Bowral.

== Death ==
Nesbit died at home in Double Bay, Sydney, on 29 June 1966, aged 83. The Nesbit Wing at Newington College is named in his honour. It was opened 29 September 1961 by Prime Minister Robert Menzies.

| Preceded by Inaugural | Chairman; Newington College Council; 1951–1964 | Succeeded by Cecil Gribble |
