= No. 101 Flight RAAF =

No. 101 (Fleet Co-Operation) Flight RAAF
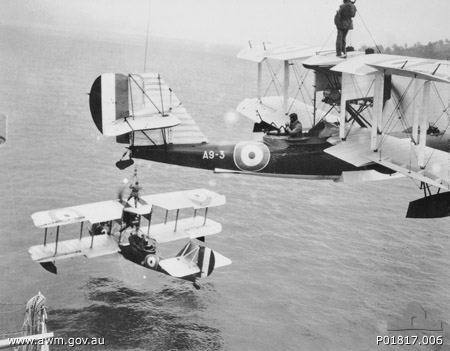
- Two Supermarine Seagull III seaplanes of No. 101 Flight being hoisted onto HMAS Albatross
- Active: 1925–1936
- Branch: Royal Australian Air Force
- Role: Maritime patrol, survey, artillery spotting

Commanders
- Notable commanders: Joe Hewitt (1932–1933)

Aircraft flown
- Patrol: Fairey III (1925–1926); Supermarine Seagull III (1926–1936)

No. 101 Flight RAAF was a Royal Australian Air Force fleet co-operation flight equipped with amphibian aircraft. The flight was formed on 1 July 1925, and operated from the Royal Australian Navy seaplane tender HMAS Albatross between 1929 and 1933. After Albatross paid off the flight's aircraft operated from the RAN's heavy cruisers HMAS Australia and HMAS Canberra. No. 101 Flight was expanded to form No. 5 Squadron on 20 April 1936.

== History ==
=== Great Barrier Reef survey ===
No. 101 (Fleet Co-Operation) Flight was formed at RAAF Station Point Cook near Melbourne on 1 July 1925. The unit was initially equipped with Fairey III float planes, and began flying in support of the Royal Australian Navy (RAN) that year. In October 1925 the flight was transferred to RAAF Station Richmond outside of Sydney. On 31 March 1926 the first two of six Supermarine Seagull III amphibian flying boats which had been purchased to re-equip No. 101 Flight arrived in Australia. All of the aircraft were delivered by June that year, and at this time most of the flight's personnel were members of the RAN. In August that year the flight's base was relocated to the Queensland town of Bowen.

The flight took part in a survey of the Great Barrier Reef between mid-1926 and early 1929. Its role in this survey built upon trial flights conducted in the area by RAAF Fairey IIIs during 1924 and 1925. In August 1926 the flight's base was relocated to the Queensland town of Bowen. The survey of the Barrier Reef was conducted in company with HMAS Moresby during 1926 and 1927.

=== Operations from RAN warships ===
In 1926 the Commonwealth Government ordered a seaplane tender, HMAS Albatross, and the RAAF was instructed to provide an air wing for the ship once she was completed; the service had not received any warning that the ship was to be ordered, and was surprised by this decision. At this time No. 101 Flight's Seagull IIIs were the only RAAF aircraft which were potentially suitable for being operated from a seaplane tender, though Albatross' designers were not informed of this. In the absence of advice from the RAAF, they designed a ship capable of operating nine Fairey IIIs which fortunately had similar dimensions to those of the Seagull III. In January 1928 the Cabinet decided to not form a RAN fleet air arm, and directed that the RAAF would provide the pilots and maintenance personnel for Albatross's air wing while the RAN would contribute observers and radio operators for the aircraft. When embarked, Albatross' air wing would come under the control of her captain.

In February 1929 No. 101 Flight returned to Point Cook and began final preparations to operate from Albatross. Six Seagulls were embarked in Melbourne on 26 February that year. The role of No. 101 Flight while embarked on Albatross was to conduct reconnaissance flights, spot artillery fire and track hostile ships. As the Seagulls could not be launched from Albatross' catapult the ship could only conduct flying operations in calm weather, and had to stop to load and unload aircraft. Nevertheless, historian Chris Coulthard-Clark has judged that "despite the fact that embarkation of the Seagull III was an expedient which meant that only air operations of quite limited scope were possible, these planes were able to satisfy reconnaissance, gunnery, torpedo spotting and survey requirements provided sea conditions were favourable".

Albatross undertook a program of trials and operations in 1929. In April 1929 all of No. 101 Flight's personnel were recalled from leave as the seaplane tender made an emergency deployment from Sydney as part of the search for Charles Kingsford Smith's aircraft Southern Cross, which had gone missing during a flight off north-western Australia. The ship sailed on 12 April, but was recalled to Sydney six hours later after it was confirmed that Southern Cross had been located. During June that year, Albatross and No. 101 Flight took part in a large exercise involving much of the RAN and The New Zealand Squadron off Queensland. Following this exercise, the seaplane tender undertook a cruise to New Guinea during July and August with Governor General Lord Stonehaven and Lady Stonehaven embarked. In October Albatross participated in a joint RAAF-RAN exercise in Port Phillip Bay which tested the tender's ability to launch an air raid and the RAAF's ability to repeal such an attack.

From 1930, Albatross regularly conducted lengthy cruises around Australia, and to New Guinea and New Zealand, and training exercises with other RAN warships. When the tender was not at sea, No. 101 Flight operated from Richmond. During the early part of this period No. 101 Flight suffered from serious tensions as many members of the unit disliked their commander from December 1929, Squadron Leader Victor Scriven, who was an exchange officer from the Royal Air Force. Scriven behaved in a high-handed manner, and engaged in dangerous practices such as attempting to recover a Seagull on board Albatross while the ship was moving; this incident nearly resulted in the deaths of the aircraft's crew. On 19 March 1930 one of No. 101 Flight's Seagulls crashed during a fleet exercise near Doughboy Island off Tasmania, killing one member of the crew and badly injuring several others. On 7 August 1930 all of the flight's aircraft flew in formation over Brisbane. As a result of the low morale in No. 101 Flight, Scriven declared it to be unable to conduct naval co-operation tasks during late 1930 or early 1931. Following this incident he was relieved of command and replaced by Squadron Leader Joe Hewitt. During September 1931 and September 1932, No. 101 Flight aircraft made trial flights from the heavy cruisers HMAS Canberra and HMAS Australia respectively while these ships conducted cruises in the islands to the north of Australia.

During their early service from Albatross, the performance of No. 101 Flight's Seagulls declined due to wear on their mechanical components and growth in weight from rust and water soakage. As a result of these problems, by 1931 the RAAF found it difficult to keep Albatross's air wing up to strength. That year, the Seagulls were overhauled at Cockatoo Island Dockyard in Sydney; this improved their performance, and the aviation writer for The Referee newspaper jokingly suggested "a flying equivalent of monkey glands" had been used to rejuvenate the Seagulls.

In March 1933 it was announced that Albatross was to be paid off and placed in reserve as part of reductions to the defence budget. At this time the Sydney Morning Herald reported that No. 101 Flight's aircraft were "out of date", and that the seaplane tender herself was considered obsolete due to rapid advances in aircraft carrier design. No. 101 Flight was retained after Albatross paid off on 26 April 1933, and continued to be based at Richmond. The seaplane tender was briefly activated during several periods in the 1930s to support seaplanes which were visiting Sydney Harbour; on these occasions No. 101 Flight personnel formed part of her complement.

Following the decommissioning of Albatross, the Naval Board agreed to a proposal that No. 101 Flight regularly operate from the RAN's two heavy cruisers. Over time, this arrangement was extended to the service's other cruisers.

In August 1934 the Commonwealth Government approved the purchase of 24 Supermarine Walrus aircraft to re-equip No. 101 Flight as part of a broader expansion of the RAAF. These aircraft began to be delivered in early 1935, with Australia receiving her Walrus during a visit to the UK ahead of operating with the Royal Navy in the Mediterranean. In June 1935 the Chief of the Air Staff, Air Vice-Marshal Richard Williams, stated that the flight was to be expanded to a full squadron. No. 101 flight was renamed No. 5 (Fleet Co-Operation) Squadron in August 1936.
