= George Mackinolty =

Royal Australian Air Force senior commander (1895–1951)

George John William Mackinolty
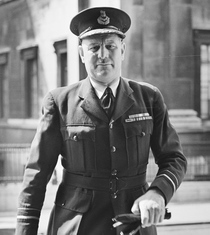
- Air Vice-Marshal George Mackinolty in London, 1948
- Born: 24 March 1895; Leongatha, Victoria
- Died: 24 February 1951 (aged 55); Laverton, Victoria
- Military career
- Allegiance: Australia
- Branch: Royal Australian Air Force
- Service years: 1914–51
- Rank: Air Vice-Marshal
- Units: Central Flying School (1914–15); No. 30 Squadron RFC (1915–16); No. 2 Squadron AFC (1916–17); No. 5 Squadron AFC (1917); No. 1 Aircraft Depot (1921–24); No. 3 Squadron (1925–29)
- Commands: Transport & Equipment Directorate (1929–35); Equipment Directorate (1935–40); Supply Directorate (1940–42); Supply & Equipment Branch (1942–51)
- Conflicts: World War I; Middle Eastern theatre; Mesopotamian campaign; World War II
- Awards: Officer of the Order of the British Empire; Mentioned in Despatches

Air Vice-Marshal George John William Mackinolty, OBE (24 March 1895 – 24 February 1951) was a senior commander in the Royal Australian Air Force (RAAF). Commencing his service in the Australian Flying Corps (AFC) as a mechanic during World War I, he rose to become the RAAF's chief logistics officer for more than twenty years. Mackinolty was born in Victoria and joined the AFC in 1914. He first saw active duty the following year in the Middle East with No. 30 Squadron Royal Flying Corps (formerly the Mesopotamian Half Flight). In 1916 he was mentioned in despatches and posted to No. 2 Squadron AFC. By the end of the war he had been commissioned a second lieutenant.

Joining the newly formed RAAF in August 1921, Mackinolty established himself as the service's senior logistician between the wars, first as Director of Transport and Equipment from 1929 to 1935, and thereafter as Director of Equipment. He was appointed an Officer of the Order of the British Empire in 1937. Soon after the outbreak of World War II, he became Director of Supply and was promoted to group captain. In June 1942 he was raised to acting air commodore and appointed the Air Member for Supply and Equipment (AMSE). Promoted to air vice-marshal in 1948, Mackinolty continued to serve as AMSE until his sudden death from cancer in February 1951, aged fifty-five.

== Early life and World War I ==
Born on 24 March 1895 at Leongatha, Victoria, Mackinolty was the son of labourer James Mickleburg Mackinolty and his wife Mary. He went to public schools, obtaining his merit certificate before undertaking formal engineering and business courses in Melbourne. Commencing his working life as a coach and motor-body builder, he enlisted in the Australian Military Forces on 17 August 1914, soon after the outbreak of World War I. His experience in the motor industry led to assignment as an air mechanic with the Aviation Instructional Staff at Central Flying School (CFS), Point Cook. He was soon promoted from private to corporal and later, having gained a reputation for his skill with timber, raised to sergeant and given command of the school's woodworking team.

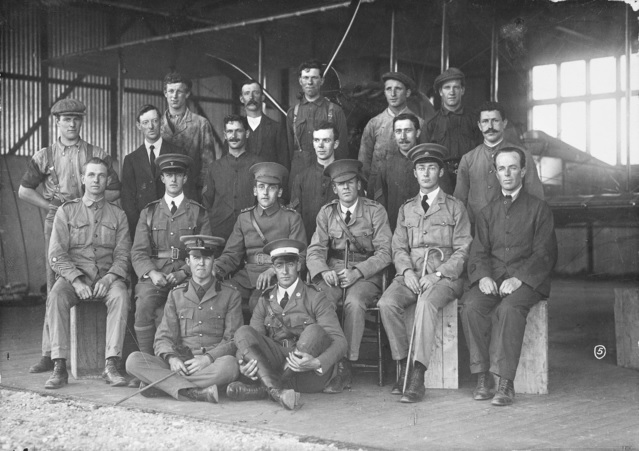
Sergeant Mackinolty (third row, left), Private Murphy (fourth row, left), Captain Petre, Lieutenant Harrison, Captain White (second row, third, fourth, fifth from left), Lieutenant Williams (front row, left) at CFS, August 1914

On 1 August 1915, Mackinolty transferred to the Australian Imperial Force, to lead a team of thirteen other mechanics as reinforcements for an Australian Flying Corps contingent serving in the Mesopotamian campaign. He departed Melbourne nine days later aboard RMS Persia, and arrived at Basra on 1 September. Mackinolty's team immediately joined No. 30 Squadron Royal Flying Corps (originally the Mesopotamian Half Flight AFC), which moved into the city of Kut after its capture by British Empire troops in the Battle of Es Sinn. The unit took part in the Battle of Ctesiphon in November, and organised supply drops to the British and Indian garrison in Kut during the siege that lasted from December 1915 until the following April.

Mackinolty was promoted in the field to flight sergeant in June 1916, and mentioned in despatches on 19 October. When the Australian members of No. 30 Squadron were dispersed, he was posted to Kantara, Egypt, where he joined the newly established No. 2 Squadron AFC (also numbered No. 68 Squadron RFC by the British). Commanded by Major Oswald Watt, the unit relocated to England in January 1917. Following his service with No. 2 Squadron, Mackinolty was assigned to No. 5 (Training) Squadron AFC, which formed at Shawbury, Shropshire, in June 1917. Praised for his organisational and leadership abilities, he was commissioned as an equipment officer in March 1918, with the rank of second lieutenant. The following month he was given command of an aircraft repair unit in Minchinhampton, Gloucestershire, home of two squadrons of the AFC's 1st Training Wing.

== Between the wars ==
Mackinolty remained in England following the end of hostilities, serving as "officer in charge of Australian packing" at RAF Hendon, near London, from December 1919 to September 1920. In this role he was responsible for crating and shipping to Point Cook the 128 aircraft and associated spares, weaponry, vehicles, hangars and other equipment that made up Britain's post-war Imperial Gift of Royal Air Force surplus to Australia, which eventually filled 19,000 cases. Mackinolty also completed formal training in aeronautical engineering before returning to Melbourne in October 1920. Discharged from the AIF in January 1921, he worked in the automotive industry and took a correspondence course on internal combustion engines.

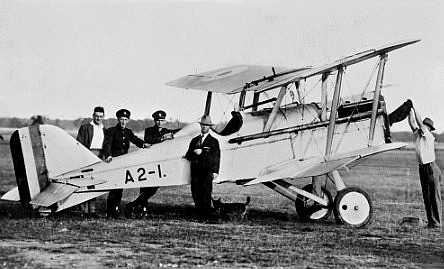
Royal Aircraft Factory S.E.5 fighter in Victoria, part of Britain's post-war "Imperial Gift" to Australia for which Mackinolty organised shipping in 1920

On 8 August 1921, Mackinolty was commissioned as a flying officer in the newly formed Royal Australian Air Force (RAAF). A member of the Stores and Accounting Branch, he commenced service with No. 1 Aircraft Depot at Point Cook in December. He was assigned to the staff of RAAF Headquarters, Melbourne, in 1924. On 20 November that year, he married Eileen Moore at Christ Church, South Yarra; the couple had a son and a daughter. In 1925, Mackinolty was posted as Equipment Officer to No. 3 Squadron at the recently established RAAF Station Richmond, New South Wales. Promoted flight lieutenant, he was appointed Director of Transport and Equipment at RAAF Headquarters in 1929, effectively making him the Air Force's senior supply officer, a role he would occupy for the next twenty-two years. His continuous tenure in essentially the one post was comparable to the RAAF's other chief logistician, Squadron Leader (later Air Vice-Marshal) Ellis Wackett, who served as its senior engineer for twenty-four years, from 1935 to 1959.

Mackinolty's position was redesignated Director of Equipment in April 1935. At around this time, he collaborated with Squadron Leader George Jones, then Director of Training, on an investigation into the state of aircraft production in Australia to highlight shortfalls in local defence in the face of possible future conflict with Japan. Though the report was reviewed enthusiastically by the Air Member for Personnel, Wing Commander Bill Anderson, it apparently went no further in the chain of command and thus was effectively ignored. Raised to squadron leader, Mackinolty was appointed an Officer of the Order of the British Empire in the Coronation Honours on 11 May 1937, in recognition of his achievements in stores and accounting. In February the following year he was promoted to wing commander. The punctilious Chief of the Air Staff, Air Vice-Marshal Richard Williams, sometimes complained that Mackinolty did not pay enough attention to his personal appearance, but never failed to acknowledge his "professional excellence".

== World War II and after ==
In April 1940 Mackinolty became Director of Supply, reporting to the Director-General of Supply and Production on the Air Board, the RAAF's controlling body. Responsible for all stores and equipment, Mackinolty also represented his service at the Federal Contract Board, Department of Supply, and Oil Board. He was promoted to temporary group captain in June that year. With the formation in 1942 of Allied Air Forces Headquarters, which assumed the operational functions of the Chief of the Air Staff, the Air Board was reorganised. The offices of Air Member for Organisation and Equipment, once held by Air Marshal Richard Williams, and Director-General of Supply and Production, a civilian position, were dissolved and replaced by those of the Air Member for Supply and Equipment (AMSE) and Air Member for Engineering and Maintenance (AMEM) to focus on the two key logistical functions of supply and engineering, respectively. Promoted to acting air commodore, Mackinolty became the inaugural AMSE in June. Air Commodore Ellis Wackett became AMEM at the same time. Norman Ashworth, in How Not to Run an Air Force!, observed that splitting the logistical functions of the Air Board in this manner appeared to be a "uniquely Australian" experiment, and it was not inconceivable that the organisation had been "tailored" to suit these "two very capable officers". Serving as AMSE for the remainder of the war, Mackinolty was credited with successfully managing the supply requirements of personnel and aircraft for an organisation that by 1945 had grown by a factor of fifty from its pre-war size, to become the world's fourth largest air force.

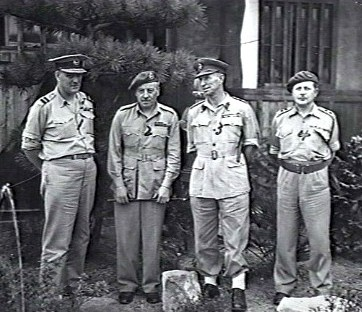
Air Commodore Mackinolty (far left) with members of the Joint Chiefs of Staff in Australia (JCOSA) after their tour of inspection of 34th Infantry Brigade in Hiro, Japan, September 1946

Following the end of hostilities, Mackinolty was personally responsible for disposing of surplus equipment up to an original value of £500, and jointly responsible (with the Business and Finance Members of the Air Board) for disposing of equipment valued between £500 and £10,000. His duties as AMSE extended to setting the peacetime meal rations for RAAF personnel. In May 1946, he joined the Australian Battlefields Memorial Committee, convened to advise the Federal government regarding commemoration of the armed forces for their wartime achievements. Later that year, Mackinolty visited British Commonwealth Occupation Force (BCOF) headquarters in Japan, and subsequently arranged for the RAAF to assume responsibility for the supply of spare parts to its air component, British Commonwealth Air Group (BCAIR). He was raised to acting air vice-marshal in January 1947 (substantive in October 1948). By this time, Mackinolty and the Chief of the Air Staff, No. 4 Squadron AFC veteran Air Vice-Marshal George Jones, were the only remaining RAAF officers who had served in both world wars. Other senior commanders and veterans of the Australian Flying Corps had been summarily retired in 1946, a "purge" that was ostensibly designed to make way for the advancement of younger and equally proficient officers.

During 1947, the RAAF prepared for the introduction of an apprentice engineering scheme. Against a harsh post-war economic climate, Mackinolty personally intervened to improve the planned accommodation for trainees, arguing that the youths could not be expected to live in the austere conditions to which other members of the Air Force were used. He further noted in his submission to the Minister for Air, Arthur Drakeford, that "the parents of apprentices will, from time to time, be permitted to visit their sons and it would be in the interest of both the Apprentice Scheme and the Service generally if all reasonable efforts were made to create a favourable impression in the minds of the parents". Shortly after the first intake of engineer apprentices in January 1948, Mackinolty formally proposed that a similar scheme be set up for apprenticeships in the supply and clerical trades. Although initially rejected by the Minister, after some refinements the plan came to fruition three years later as the Junior Equipment and Administrative Training Scheme.

In January 1951, Mackinolty was struck down suddenly with cancer and admitted to hospital at RAAF Station Laverton, Victoria. He died there on 24 February, survived by his wife and children. At the time of his death, he had served for a decade as honorary treasurer of the Returned Sailors', Soldiers' and Airmens' Imperial League of Australia, and was the last member of the original staff of the AFC in 1914 still serving. He was succeeded as AMSE by Air Vice-Marshal Joe Hewitt. Described by Air Force historian Alan Stephens as "the most significant logistics officer in the history of the RAAF", Mackinolty was accorded an Air Force funeral with full honours at Bathurst Memorial Chapel, Elsternwick, and cremated at Springvale Crematorium.
