= Department of the Navy (Australia) =

Australian government department, 1939–1973

Department overview
- Formed: 13 November 1939
- Dissolved: 30 November 1973
- Jurisdiction: Commonwealth of Australia
- Department executives: A. R. Nankervis, Secretary (1939‑50); T. J. Hawkins, Secretary (1950‑63); A. Landau, Secretary (1963‑73)

The Department of the Navy is a former Australian federal government department created on 13 November 1939 to replace the Navy Office within the Department of Defence, after the outbreak of the Second World War.

The department assumed control of the administration and finance of the Royal Australian Navy (RAN) from the Department of Defence. The department was abolished by the Whitlam government on 30 November 1973 when the single service departments were amalgamated, with its role assumed by the Navy Office within the Department of Defence.
