= No. 5 Squadron RAAF =

Royal Australian Air Force squadron

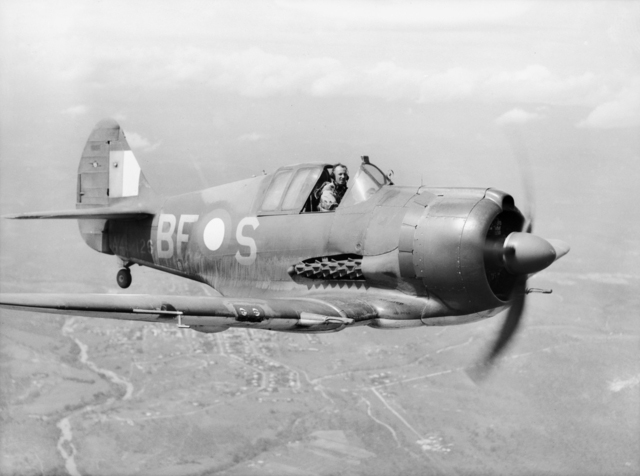
- A Boomerang aircraft operated by No. 5 Squadron in 1944
- Active: June 1917 – May 1919; April 1936 – December 1938; January 1941 – October 1946; May 1964 – December 1989
- Country: Australia
- Branch: Royal Australian Air Force
- Role: Training (1917–1919); Naval co-operation (1936–1938); Army co-operation (1941–1946); Utility helicopter (1964–1989)
- Engagements: World War I World War II; Indonesia-Malaysia Confrontation

Commanders
- Notable commanders: Beau Palmer (1945)

Aircraft flown
- Fighter: Farman Shorthorn; Airco DH.6; Avro 504; Sopwith Pup; SE5a; Sopwith Camel; Sopwith Snipe; CAC Wirraway; CAC Boomerang; P-40 Kittyhawk
- Helicopter: UH-1 Iroquois; AS350B Squirrel
- Patrol: Supermarine Seagull

No. 5 Squadron was a Royal Australian Air Force training, army co-operation and helicopter squadron. The squadron was formed in 1917 as a training unit of the Australian Flying Corps in Britain, readying pilots for service on the Western Front. It subsequently became a naval fleet co-operation squadron, but was later redesignated as No. 9 Squadron RAAF before being re-formed as an army co-operation squadron during World War II. In the mid-1960s, it was re-formed as a helicopter squadron, before being disbanded in December 1989, when it was used to form the Australian Defence Force Helicopter Training School.

== History ==
=== World War I and interbellum ===
No. 5 Squadron was formed at Shawbury in England on 15 June 1917, as a unit of the Australian Flying Corps, under the command of Captain Andrew Lang, and was initially known as "29 (Australian) (Training) Squadron" of the Royal Flying Corps. During August 1917, Major Henry Petre assumed command of the squadron. Its Australian Flying Corps designation ("No. 5 (Training) Squadron, AFC") was officially recognised in early 1918. Equipped with a variety of aircraft, including Maurice Farman Shorthorns, Airco DH.6, Avro 504s, Sopwith Pups, S.E.5as and Sopwith Camels, the squadron provided training to Australian pilots in Britain during World War I. After completing their training with No. 5 Squadron Australian pilots could be posted to one of the operational squadrons but to begin with the squadron's main role was to train pilots and observers for service in No. 1 Squadron in the Middle East. Later, when equipped with Camels, the squadron supplied pilots to 4 Squadron, Australian Flying Corps. During the war, the squadron graduated on average of eight pilots per month, who were trained by combat experienced pilots transferred from the operational squadrons. No. 5 Squadron was embarked to return to Australia in May 1919 and was for formally disbanded on reaching Australia the following month.

On 20 April 1936, No. 5 Squadron was re-formed at RAAF Base Richmond as a naval fleet co-operation squadron by expanding No. 101 (Fleet Co-Operation) Flight. Equipped with the Supermarine Seagull V amphibian aircraft, the squadron's detached flights operated from Royal Australian Navy cruisers and the seaplane tender HMAS Albatross. No. 5 Squadron was redesignated No. 9 Squadron on 1 January 1939.

=== World War II ===
On 9 January 1941, No. 5 Squadron was re-formed at RAAF Base Laverton as an army co-operation squadron equipped with Wirraways. The squadron was relocated to Toowoomba in Queensland on 17 May 1942. On 17 November 1942, the squadron was relocated to Toogoolawah for three months before redeploying to Kingaroy. The squadron was partially re-equipped with Boomerangs in late 1943 and was assigned to several different stations in Australia. On 11 November 1944, No. 5 Squadron was deployed to Piva Airfield at Torokina on Bougainville under No. 84 (Army Co-operation) Wing, and operated with units of the Royal New Zealand Air Force, undertaking reconnaissance, artillery observation, ground attack, and aerial resupply missions in support of Australian ground troops fighting against the Japanese on the island. The squadron also operated detachments on New Britain and New Guinea.

In September 1945, shortly after the end of the war, the squadron received three or four P-40 Kittyhawks, but retained Boomerangs and Wirraways. In early 1946, the squadron was transferred to Western Australia, as a cadre, with the intention of rebuilding the squadron. However, No 5 Squadron was disbanded on 18 October 1946 at RAAF Base Pearce. During the war, 24 members of the squadron lost their lives.

=== Cold War ===
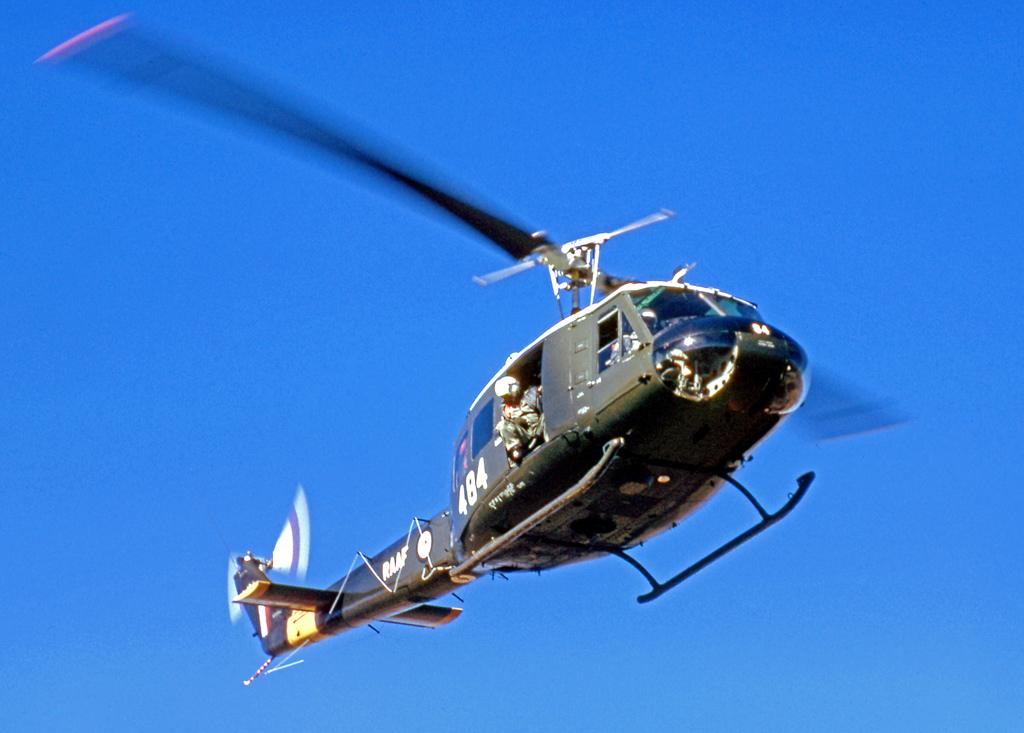
Bell Iroquois of No. 5 Squadron in 1971

No. 5 Squadron was re-formed in 1964 as a helicopter squadron equipped with Bell UH-1 Iroquois utility helicopters. The squadron saw active service in support of anti-insurgent operations on the Thai-Malay border and then in the Indonesia-Malaysia Confrontation.

On 12 April 1966, No. 9 Squadron RAAF at RAAF Base Fairbairn was renumbered as No. 5 Squadron RAAF (with a 'new' No. 9 Squadron promptly formed for deployment to South Vietnam as part of Australia's commitment to the Vietnam War. The squadron in Malaysia was retitled as No. 5 Squadron Detachment C, which was disbanded the following month, with its members returning to the squadron at Fairbairn. The squadron trained aircrew preparing for service in Vietnam and supported battalions training up for deployment to Vietnam. It also conducted search and rescue sorties.

In the mid-1970s and mid-1980s, the squadron contributed Iroquois to peacekeeping missions in the Middle East Egypt, firstly to Ismailia with the United Nations Emergency Force and then later to the Sinai as part of the Multinational Force and Observers.

The squadron acquired AS350B Squirrel utility helicopters in early 1984, and along with the Iroquois UH1-Hs, the squadron continued the training role and Army support, in addition to providing aid to the civil community in times of natural disaster. In December 1989, No. 5 Squadron was disbanded and absorbed into the Australian Defence Force Helicopter School (ADFHS) in 1990.

== See also ==
- No. 5 Flight RAAF
