= Charles Scherf =

Australian Second World War flying ace

Charles Curnow Scherf
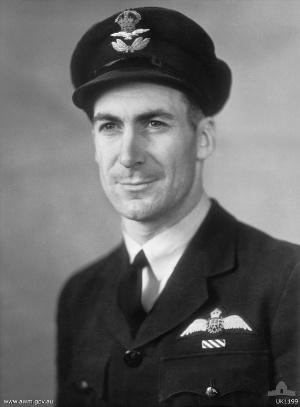
- Charles Scherf c. 1944
- Born: 17 May 1917; Emmaville, New South Wales
- Died: 13 July 1949 (aged 32); Emmaville, New South Wales
- Military career
- Allegiance: Australia
- Branch: Citizens Military Force; Royal Australian Air Force
- Service years: 1934–1939; 1941–1947
- Rank: Squadron Leader
- Nickname: "Last Trip"
- Unit: No. 418 Squadron RCAF
- Conflicts: Second World War; European theatre
- Awards: Distinguished Service Order; Distinguished Flying Cross & Bar

Charles Curnow Scherf, DSO, DFC & Bar (17 May 1917 – 13 July 1949) was an Australian flying ace of the Second World War. Born in New South Wales, Scherf was working on his father's grazing property when he enlisted in the Royal Australian Air Force in 1941. On graduating as a pilot, he was sent to the United Kingdom for service in the European theatre. Flying de Havilland Mosquitos with No. 418 Squadron RCAF, Scherf was credited with the destruction of 7½ aircraft in the air and on the ground, and awarded the Distinguished Flying Cross. Afterward, he was posted for duties with Headquarters Air Defence of Great Britain. He nevertheless returned occasionally to No. 418 Squadron and flew operational sorties with the unit, destroying a further 16 aircraft and earning two more decorations. By the end of the war, Scherf had achieved 14½ aerial victories in 38 operational sorties. He was also credited with destroying nine aircraft on the ground, and with damaging seven others.

== Early life ==
Scherf was born at Emmaville, New South Wales, on 17 May 1917, the son of Charles Henry Scherf, a grazier, and his Cornish wife Susan Jane (née Curnow). An active sportsman, Scherf attended the local school where he obtained an Intermediate Certificate. In 1934, he enlisted in the Citizens Military Force and was allotted to the 12th Light Horse Regiment as a private. He rose to the rank of corporal, before taking his discharge in 1939. On 23 August 1939, Scherf married Florence Hope O'Hara in an Anglican ceremony at the Holy Trinity Church, Glen Innes; the couple had a son and three daughters. By this time he was working as a grazier on his father's property.

== Second World War ==
On 12 September 1941, Scherf enlisted in the Royal Australian Air Force for service during the Second World War. Posted for flight training at No. 10 Empire Flight Training School, Temora, and later No. 6 Service Flying Training School, Mallala, he graduated as a pilot with an "above average" rating on 2 July 1942. Commissioned as a pilot officer on 17 September, Scherf embarked from Sydney bound for the United Kingdom the following month. Following a six-week voyage, he disembarked on 27 November and was attached to Royal Air Force training units for "advanced flying and operational training". He was promoted to flying officer during this time. On completion, Scherf was posted to No. 418 Squadron RCAF on 13 July 1943, flying the de Havilland Mosquito, on intruder (a.k.a. "ranger") operations over occupied Europe.

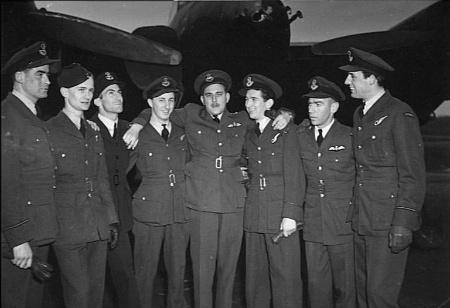
The pilots and navigators of four Mosquito crews who successfully engaged the enemy on a recent sortie. In a period of eight minutes, the four teams destroyed seven Axis aircraft and badly damaged another. Scherf is third from left.

In August 1943, Scherf commenced flying operational sorties against Axis airfields in France. On 15 September, he flew as an escort to a group of eight Lancaster bombers during a low level attack on the Dortmund-Ems Canal, Germany. He was promoted to acting flight lieutenant on 29 December. During this time, Scherf took part in several night operations and was credited with damaging a variety of targets as well as shooting down four German aircraft at night. Praised for his "exceptional keenness and ... courage", Scherf was awarded the Distinguished Flying Cross for his night time exploits. The announcement and accompanying citation for the award was published in a supplement to the London Gazette on 4 April 1944.

In late February 1944, Scherf took part in a sortie over Axis occupied territory with Squadron Leader Howie Clevelend; Scherf flew the leading aircraft of the two. The pair attacked an Axis airfield at St Yan, France, and successfully destroyed three aircraft on the ground. Soon after, the two pilots spotted a Heinkel He 111Z twin-fuselage glider tug towing two Gotha Go 242 gliders. Scherf and Clevelend attacked the party, with Clevelend firing first and destroying one of the gliders. Scherf then destroyed the second glider, before the pair assaulted the Heinkel. In the first pass, Scherf set the starboard engine ablaze while Clevelend hit the starboard side. Scherf made a second firing pass, before the Heinkel spiralled to the ground with three of its five engines on fire. This action was Scherf's final sortie of his tour. The pair were credited with shooting down three aircraft in this operation, with an additional three others damaged or destroyed on the ground.

On 13 March 1944, Scherf was promoted to acting squadron leader and, with his operation tour at an end, was posted to Headquarters Air Defence of Great Britain as a controller of Intruder operations. By the time of this posting, Scherf had destroyed seven airborne or grounded German aircraft, with an additional shared victory. Despite his new position, Scherf's "impatient spirit was far from satisfied with a staff position", and he occasionally returned to No. 418 Squadron when he was off duty, taking part in operational sorties with the unit. On 5 April, Scherf joined the squadron in a sortie over Northern France. During the engagement, Scherf shot down two Axis aircraft in the air and damaged three more on the ground. For his actions on the two operations in February and April, Scherf was awarded a Bar to his Distinguished Flying Cross. The citation for the decoration was published in a supplement to the London Gazette on 12 May 1944, reading:

Air Ministry, 12th May, 1944

The KING has been graciously pleased to approve the following awards in recognition of gallantry displayed in flying operations against the enemy —

Bar to Distinguished Flying Cross

Acting Flight Lieutenant Charles Curnow SCHERF, DFC (Aus 413671), Royal Australian Air Force, No 418 (RCAF) Squadron.

Since being awarded the Distinguished Flying Cross, this officer has taken part in numerous sorties and has continued to display the highest qualities of gallantry and skill. Towards the end of February, 1944, he flew the leading aircraft of two detailed for a sortie far in enemy occupied territory. During the operation three enemy aircraft were shot down, and three others damaged on the ground. During another sortie over Northern France in April, 1944, Flight Lieutenant Scherf destroyed two enemy aircraft in the air and damaged three others on the ground at an airfield. These 2 sorties were a fitting climax to an outstanding tour. This officer has destroyed at least 9 enemy aircraft, successes which pay an excellent tribute to his great fighting qualities and resolution.

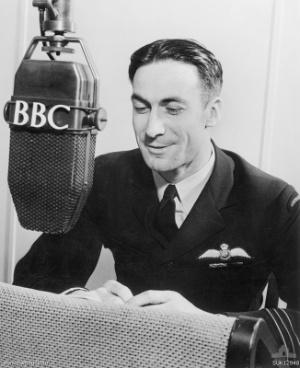
Charles Scherf broadcasts his fighter pilot experiences over the BBC radio.

On 2 and 16 May 1944, Scherf took part in two further daylight sorties with No. 418 Squadron into "well-defended areas far into Germany". Leading a section of Mosquito aircraft in action against Luftwaffe bases in the Baltic area and over northern Germany, Scherf was credited with shooting down six aircraft in aerial combat, and damaging an additional three on the ground over the two operations. Commended for his "great skill, enterprise and fearlessness", Scherf was awarded the Distinguished Service Order. The notification and accompanying citation for the decoration was published in a supplement to the London Gazette on 27 June 1944.

Scherf embarked to return to Australia on 10 July 1944, arriving in Brisbane two months later. He was briefly posted to RAAF Station Sandgate, before moving to No. 5 Operational Training Unit, based at Williamtown, as chief flying instructor in October. He served in this position until late December, when he was posted for duties with RAAF Base Richmond and later RAAF Bradfield Park. On 11 April 1945, Scherf transferred to Royal Australian Air Force Reserve and returned to his home in Emmaville, thus ending his wartime service. By this time, Scherf had been officially credited with shooting down 14½ Axis aircraft in aerial combat, as well as nine aircraft destroyed on the ground and a further seven damaged from a total of 38 operational sorties.

== Later life ==
On 16 February 1946, Scherf attended an investiture ceremony at Government House, Sydney, where he was presented with his decorations by the Governor-General of Australia, Prince Henry, Duke of Gloucester. Scherf was discharged from the Royal Australian Air Force Reserve on 1 July 1947.

Scherf found it difficult to re-adjust to civilian life, and began to have nightmares about the Germans he had shot down and killed during the war. This led him to drink heavily. On 13 July 1949, Scherf was driving his car along the Inverell road approximately 3 kilometres (1.9 mi) from Emmaville when he struck a tree and the vehicle overturned. He died from his injuries later that day. Survived by his wife, their three daughters and son, Scherf was buried in the local cemetery. Two RAAF P-51 Mustang fighters flew in formation over the cemetery as the funeral party arrived, followed by a Mosquito as Scherf's casket was lowered into the grave.
