= Naval Base Adelaide =

Former United States Navy Base

- Location within Australia
- Location: South Australia
- Coordinates: 34.839°S 138.505°E
- Established: 1942 (closed 1944)

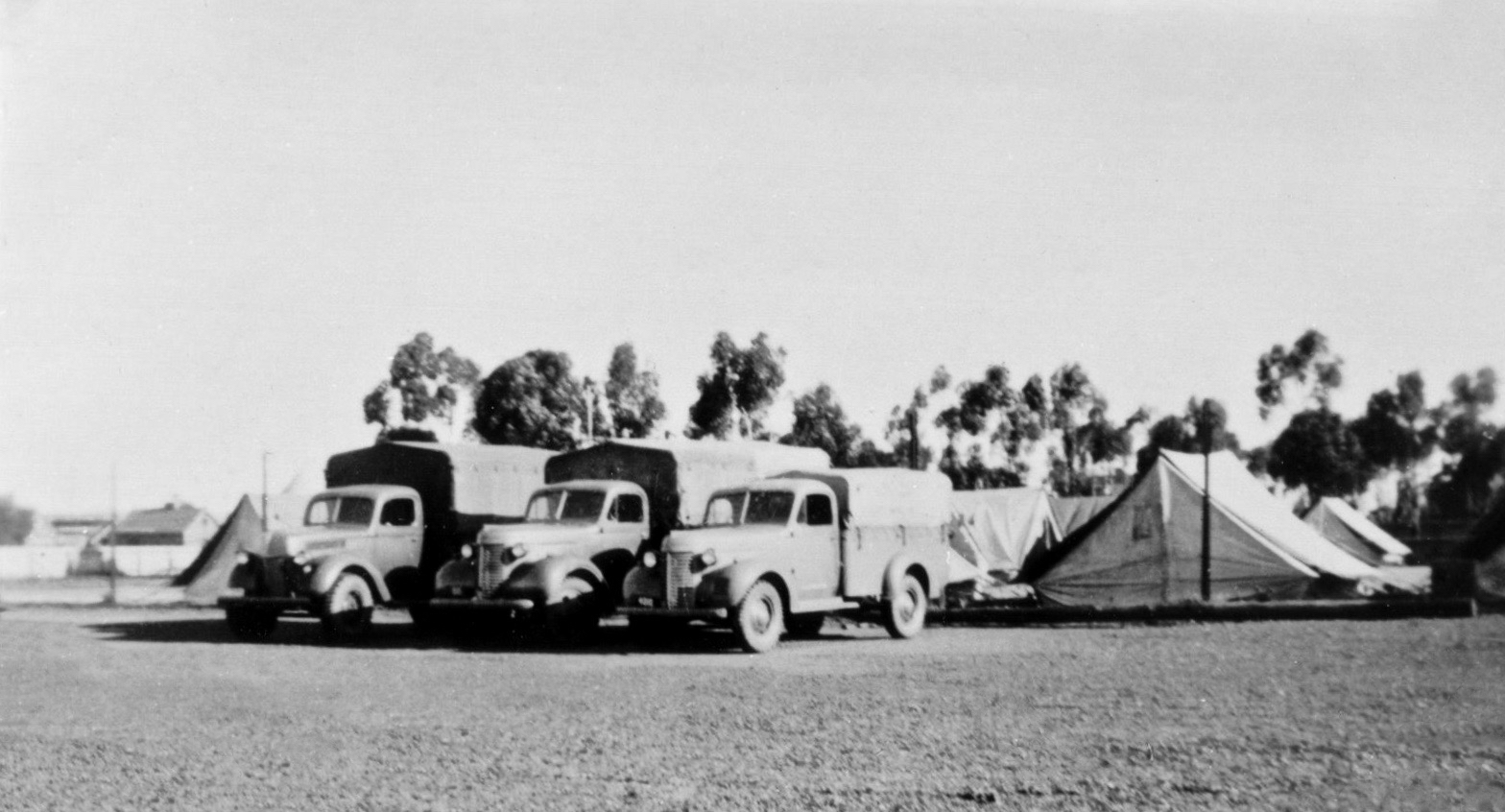
Camp Terowie north of Adelaide in 1942

Troops at Terowie railway station in 1942

Naval Base Adelaide was a United States Navy base at Adelaide and Port Adelaide, South Australia, Australia during World War II. Northern Australian ports were within reach of Japanese long-range bombers. The bombing of Darwin on February 19, 1942, demonstrated that a more southern port was needed, with Adelaide, in southern Australia, being distant from the possibility of any current or future attacks. The existing port facilities at Adelaide were large enough to support the staging of future actions. Local civilians were hired to help in the unloading and loading of US Navy, US Army and Merchant Navy ships.

== History ==
Protected by Fort Largs, Port Adelaide was an Army staging port from May 1942 to July 1942, with depots supplying the 32nd Division of the United States Army. Camps were built 120 mi (190 km) from the Port of Adelaide. Japan planned an invasion of Australia, but after their losses at the Battle of the Coral Sea, Japan canceled these plans. In 1944 use of the distant Port of Adelaide lessened as newer bases closer to the action were built. After the war, the US Navy and Army bases were closed.

== Adelaide Convoys ==
- Regular convoys were numbered, with the code letter prefix "CO" being used for the Newcastle to Melbourne and Adelaide run, from June 1942 to December 1943, with 150 convoys; the reverse trip had the code prefix "OC".
- The first CO convoy was CO.1, and departed on June 8, 1942. Ships in the convoy included: British Age, British Allara, George M. Livanos, New Zealand MV Hauraki,^{a} British Iron Baron, British Macedon, British Meroo, British Scottish Chief, Greek Theofano Livanos and Norwegian Vito, escorted by Australian destroyer HMAS Arunta and corvette/minesweeper HMAS Kalgoorlie. The last convoy was CO.149, which departed December 4, 1943 with ships: British Barrosa,^{b} British Helen Moller, Yugoslav Olga Topic, British Wear, and US Wilbur Wright,^{c} escorted by Australian corvette/minesweeper HMAS Ballarat and auxiliary patrol vessel HMAS Wilcannia.
- Some ships that ported at Adelaide: USS Ancon, USS Briareus, SS America, MV Duntroon, MS West Honaker, and the SS President Taft,

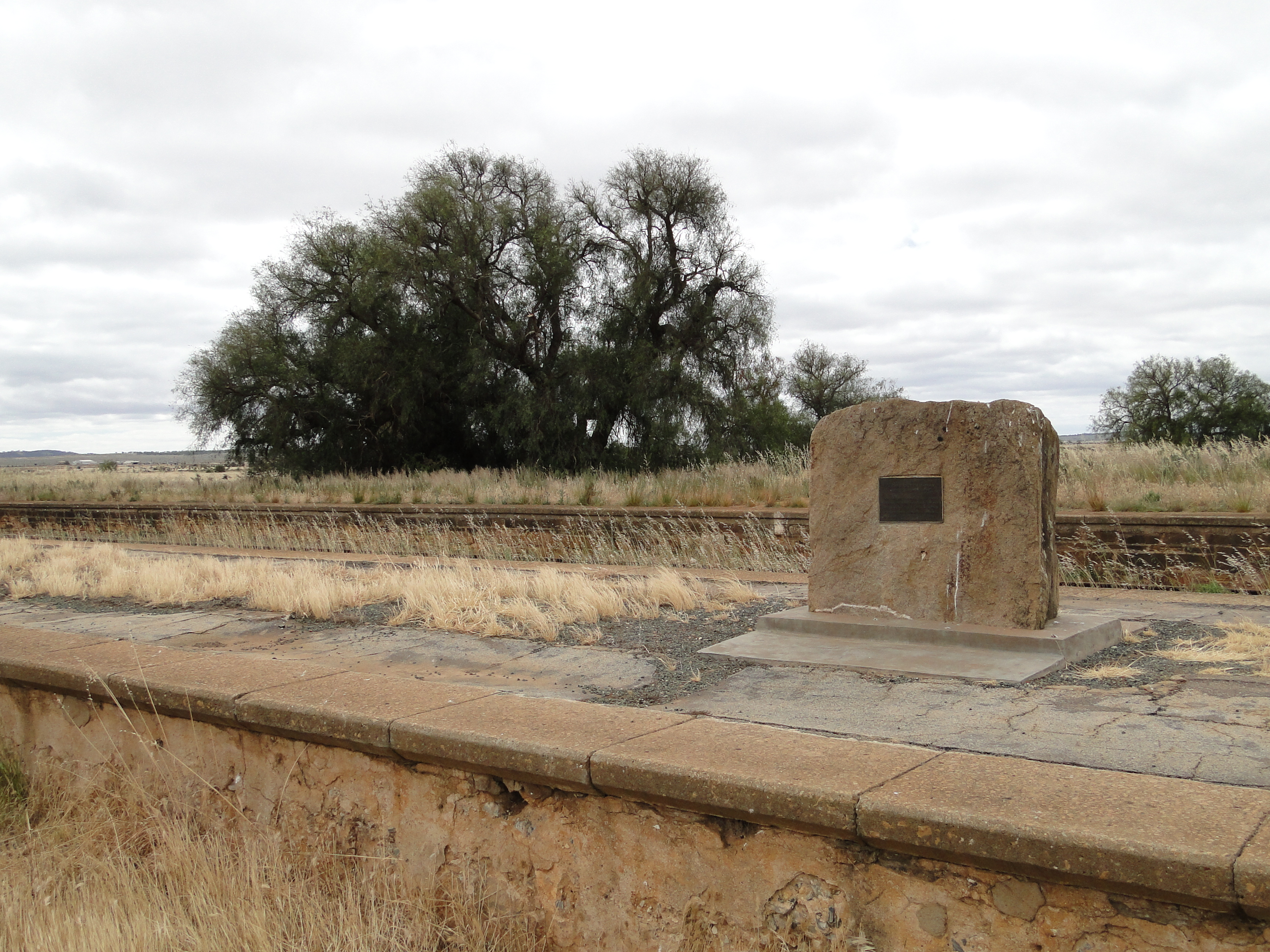
General Douglas MacArthur monument at Terowie railway station

== Supply depot ==
The US Army set up a supply depot, Base Section 5, outside of Adelaide. The depot was run by the 84th Ordnance for the 32nd Division. The depot supplied remote advance bases. Due to port limitations, the depots were set up inland, and rail lines and trucks were used to move supplies.

== South Australian airfields ==
Both the US Navy and US Army used some of the nearby Australian Airfields:

- Ceduna Airfield, now Ceduna Airport
- Gawler Airfield, now Gawler Aerodrome
- Kingscote Airfield, now Kingscote Airport
- Mallala Airfield, RAAF Base Mallala; now defunct
- Mount Gambier Airfield, now Mount Gambier Airport
- Oodnadatta Airfield, now Oodnadatta Airport
- Parafield Airfield (Adelaide Airfield), now Parafield Airport
- Port Lincoln Airfield, now Port Lincoln Airport
- Port Pirie Airfield, now Port Pirie Airport

== Post war ==
- Plaques United States Servicemen, Text on the plaques, located in the Adelaide Botanic Garden: at 34.918°S 138.611°E

In deep gratitude to the men and women of the United States of America who joined in the defense of Australia during the war of 1939 - 1945

== See also ==
- Eastern Area Command (RAAF)
- HM Naval Dockyard Williamstown
- US Naval Advance Bases

== Notes ==
a:. New Zealand-registered MV Hauraki was captured by Japanese armed merchant cruiser Aikoku Maru near Ceylon, 12 July 1942.

b:. Possibly SS Barossa

c:. For SS Wilbur Wright, see List of Liberty ships (S–Z)
