= Frank Bladin =

Royal Australian Air Force officer (1898–1978)

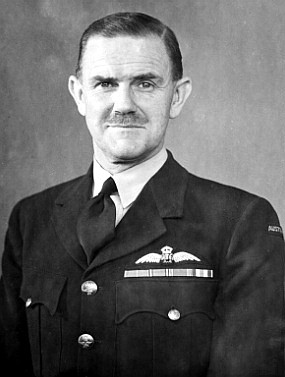
- Air Commodore Bladin in 1943
- Born: 26 August 1898; Korumburra, Victoria
- Died: 2 February 1978 (aged 79); Melbourne
- Military career
- Allegiance: Australia
- Service/branch: Royal Australian Air Force
- Service years: 1920–1953
- Rank: Air Vice-Marshal
- Nickname: Dad
- Units: No. 38 Group RAF (1943–1944); 2nd Tactical Air Force RAF (1944)
- Commands: No. 1 Squadron (1934–1935); Southern Area Command (1941–1942); North-Western Area Command (1942–1943); Eastern Area Command (1947–1948)
- Conflicts: World War II; South West Pacific theatre; North Western Area campaign; European theatre; Operation Overlord
- Awards: Companion of the Order of the Bath; Commander of the Order of the British Empire; Mentioned in Despatches; Silver Star (US)
- Other work: Grazier; RSL National Treasurer

Air Vice-Marshal Francis Masson Bladin, CB, CBE (26 August 1898 – 2 February 1978) was a senior commander in the Royal Australian Air Force (RAAF). Born in rural Victoria, he graduated from the Royal Military College, Duntroon, in 1920. Bladin transferred from the Army to the Air Force in 1923, and learned to fly at RAAF Point Cook, Victoria. He held training appointments before taking command of No. 1 Squadron in 1934. Quiet but authoritative, he was nicknamed "Dad" in tribute to the concern he displayed for the welfare of his personnel.

Ranked wing commander at the outbreak of World War II, by September 1941 Bladin had been raised to temporary air commodore. He became Air Officer Commanding North-Western Area in March 1942, following the first Japanese air raids on Darwin, Northern Territory. Personally leading sorties against enemy territory, he earned the United States Silver Star for gallantry. In July 1943, Bladin was posted to No. 38 Group RAF in Europe, where he was mentioned in despatches. He was appointed a Commander of the Order of the British Empire the same year.

Promoted to acting air vice-marshal in 1946, Bladin was among the coterie of senior officers who helped shape the post-war RAAF. His roles in the late 1940s and early 1950s included chief of staff of the British Commonwealth Occupation Force in Japan, Air Officer Commanding Eastern Area (later RAAF Air Command), and Air Member for Personnel. Appointed a Companion of the Order of the Bath in 1950, he retired to his country property in 1953, but remained active in veterans' affairs.

== Early life and career ==
Francis Masson Bladin was born on 26 August 1898 in Korumburra, Victoria, the youngest son of engineer Frederick Bladin and his wife Ellen. Educated to junior public level at Melbourne High School, Frank sought to join the Australian Imperial Force during World War I. His parents refused their permission, and he instead entered the Royal Military College, Duntroon, in 1917. Graduating in 1920, Bladin served for the next two years in the Australian Army, including sixteen months seconded to the Royal Field Artillery in Britain.

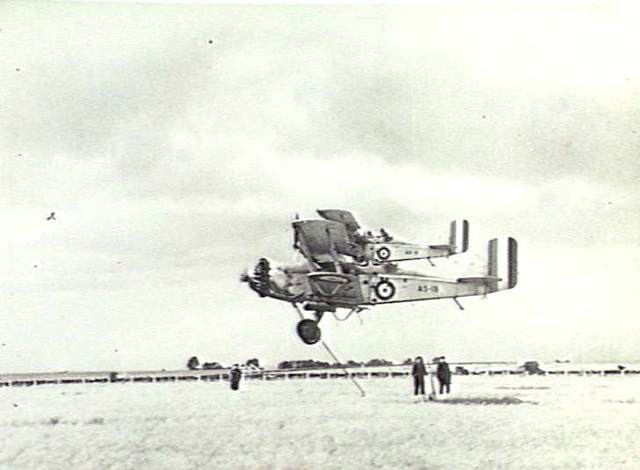
Wapitis of No. 1 Squadron at Laverton, Victoria, November 1934

In January 1923 Bladin transferred to the recently established Royal Australian Air Force (RAAF) as a flying officer. He undertook pilot training at Point Cook, Victoria, where he was among five former Army lieutenants on the inaugural RAAF flying course—all of whom had left their original service in part because of poor career prospects in the post-war army. One of Bladin's other classmates on the course was a 1919 graduate of the Royal Australian Naval College, Sub-Lieutenant Joe Hewitt. During 1925–26, Bladin was in charge of running Citizens Air Force (reserve) pilots' courses at No. 1 Flying Training School, Point Cook. Having been promoted to flight lieutenant, he married Patricia Magennis at Yass, New South Wales, on 20 December 1927; the couple had a son and two daughters.

Bladin was posted to Britain in 1929 to attend RAF Staff College, Andover, and wrote an article on Empire air defence in 1931 for Royal Air Force Quarterly, one of the few published pieces of work on air power produced by RAAF officers in the pre-war years. Promoted to squadron leader, he took over as commanding officer of No. 1 Squadron from Squadron Leader Frank Lukis in April 1934. Bladin found that the unit, flying Westland Wapitis and Hawker Demons out of RAAF Station Laverton in Victoria, "had not operated under field conditions away from its brick hangars and concrete tarmac since its inception some eight years previous". He proceeded to change this, deploying the squadron 300 miles away to Cootamundra in rural New South Wales, where he "borrowed a portion of a sheep station from a friend so that the pilots could carry out their bombing practice" over a two-week period commencing in late November 1935.

After completing his tenure with No. 1 Squadron in December 1935, Bladin was appointed Officer Commanding Cadet Squadron at No. 1 Flying Training School. He modelled the squadron's training course on that of Duntroon, foreshadowing instruction at the Air Force's own cadet institute, RAAF College, which would be established in 1947. On 12 March 1937, he was promoted to wing commander.

== World War II ==
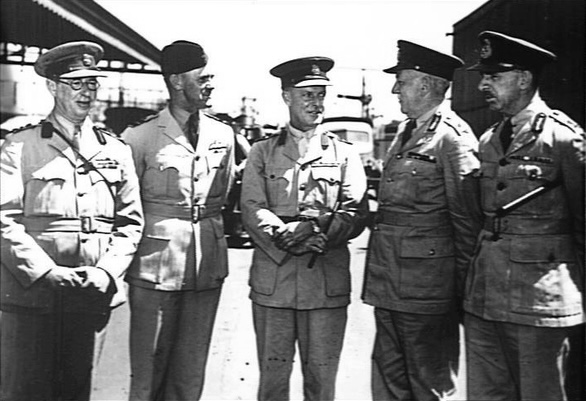
Air Commodore Bladin (second from left) with Lieutenant General Savige (left) and Major Generals Clowes, Cannan and Rowell in Melbourne, December 1941

Bladin's first posting following the outbreak of World War II was as Director of Operations and Intelligence at RAAF Headquarters, Melbourne, in March 1940. Promoted to group captain in June, he became Air Officer Commanding (AOC) Southern Area in August 1941 and was raised to acting air commodore the following month. By 1 January 1942, Bladin was serving as Assistant Chief of the Air Staff (Operations), charged with readying air bases and putting into effect plans for the Empire Air Training Scheme. He took over as AOC North-Western Area (NWA) on 25 March that year.

Based in Darwin, Bladin's role as AOC NWA was to conduct the air defence of Torres Strait, the Northern Territory, and north Western Australia. He also had to restore morale following the bombing of Darwin on 19 February 1942 and deal with the threat of imminent invasion, tasks complicated by the poor state of local communications, transport and early warning systems. Initiating combat training for all RAAF ground crew, Bladin constructed secondary airfields so he could disperse his forces. He became, in the words of historian Alan Stephens, "the RAAF's outstanding area commander of the war", and earned distinction as the first Australian decorated by the United States in the Pacific theatre of operations when he was awarded the Silver Star for gallantry. The cited action took place in June when Bladin personally led a raid by US B-17 Flying Fortresses on Celebes in the Dutch East Indies. As well as destroying machines on the ground and damaging infrastructure, the Allied bombers managed to evade an attack by nine Japanese fighters during their return to base. Bladin's award was recommended in September, and promulgated in the Australian Gazette on 23 November 1944.

By December 1942, Bladin's strength in NWA consisted of seven RAAF squadrons operating mainly Bristol Beaufighter and P-40 Kittyhawk fighters, Lockheed Hudson light bombers, and A-31 Vengeance dive bombers. These were soon augmented by one squadron each of Dutch East Indies B-25 Mitchell medium bombers and US B-24 Liberator heavy bombers. As Japanese air raids continued into 1943, Bladin placed his bombers inland, and his fighters close to the coast where they could intercept the raiders. Appointed a Commander of the Order of the British Empire on 1 January 1943, he stepped up offensive strikes against island bases and shipping in the Timor and Arafura Seas as the Allies took the fight to the Japanese. He often employed his own judgement in the selection of targets, as detailed directives from superior headquarters were not always forthcoming. On 27 February, acting on intercepted radio transmissions, he launched a pre-emptive raid on Penfui airfield, near Koepang on Timor, which destroyed or damaged twenty-two Japanese bombers that had been destined to make a major raid on Darwin.

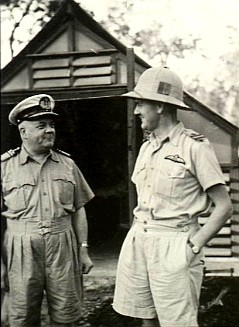
Bladin (right) as Air Officer Commanding North-Western Area, c. 1943

To help protect northern Australia from ongoing air attack, three squadrons of Spitfire fighters were transferred from the United Kingdom in late 1942, becoming operational in March 1943 as No. 1 Fighter Wing. A major engagement over Darwin on 2 May resulted in eight Spitfires crashing and several others making forced landings, for the destruction of one Japanese bomber and five fighters. An adverse communiqué concerning the action was issued from General Douglas MacArthur's headquarters and was picked up by Australian newspapers, which reported the Spitfires' "heavy losses" and caused resentment in NWA. Bladin complained to his superior, Air Vice-Marshal Bill Bostock, that the "alarmist tendency of the press and radio references was having a bad effect on the combat pilots". He also ordered an immediate Beaufighter strike led by Wing Commander Charles Read against Penfui airfield, on the assumption that this was where the Japanese raiders were based; four aircraft were destroyed on the ground.

On 17 June 1943, under the command of Group Captain Clive Caldwell, No. 1 Fighter Wing recorded NWA's most successful interception to date, claiming fourteen Japanese raiders destroyed and ten damaged, for the loss of two Spitfires. The 380th Bombardment Group USAAF, consisting of four squadrons of Liberators, came under Bladin's control the same month, enhancing NWA's strategic strike capability. When Bladin handed over North-Western Area to Air Vice-Marshal Adrian Cole in July 1943, the latter reported that his new command was "well organised, keen and in good shape".

Posted to England as senior air staff officer (SASO) of No. 38 Group RAF, Bladin was closely involved in training aircrew and planning airborne operations for Operation Overlord, the Allied invasion of France. He flew a mission on D-Day, 6 June 1944, to deliver glider-borne troops to Normandy, and was mentioned in despatches two days later. Completing his RAF service on the staff of the Second Tactical Air Force in France, Bladin returned to Australia to become Deputy Chief of the Air Staff in October 1944. On two occasions in June 1945, he was considered for the position of AOC RAAF Command, the Air Force's main operational formation in the South West Pacific. Bladin would have replaced Bostock, who was facing disciplinary action for refusing to comply with directives from the Air Board, the RAAF's controlling body, but in the end the Australian government made no change to command arrangements.

== Post-war career ==
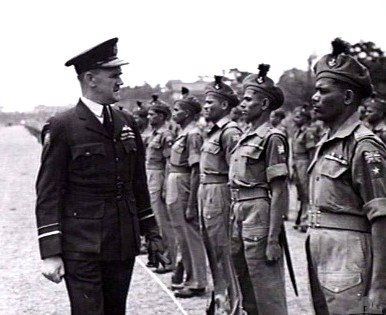
Air Vice-Marshal Bladin reviewing BCOF troops, Tokyo, May 1947

The RAF had planned to deploy an airborne formation, No. 238 (Airborne Assault) Group, to the Pacific theatre and requested Bladin be released from his duties as Deputy Chief of the Air Staff to assume its command, but this was cancelled with the end of hostilities in August 1945. His next posting was to Kure, Japan, in January 1946, as chief of staff to Lieutenant General John Northcott, commander of the British Commonwealth Occupation Force (BCOF). Northcott reportedly chose Bladin not only for his operational command and staff experience in the RAAF and the RAF during World War II, but for his pedigree as a Duntroon graduate rather than having a purely Air Force background. Promoted acting air vice-marshal on 1 March 1946, Bladin handed over to another Duntroon graduate, Air Vice-Marshal John McCauley, in June 1947. After returning to Australia, Bladin was to figure prominently, along with such figures as McCauley, Air Commodore Hewitt and Air Commodore Frederick Scherger, in shaping the post-war Air Force.

Bladin's next command was Eastern Area, which would evolve over the years into Home Command, Operational Command and, finally, Air Command. His acting rank of air vice-marshal was made substantive on 1 October 1948. As AOC Eastern Area, Bladin was instrumental in organising the acquisition of a new site for his then-headquarters at Bradfield Park on Sydney's North Shore, namely the former Lapstone Hotel at Glenbrook in the Blue Mountains. Subsequently known as Headquarters Operational Command, later Headquarters Air Command, the site was purchased in mid-1949, and became operational at the end of the year. As well as commanding a view of the surrounding countryside, the property was within five kilometres (three miles) of the City of Penrith and thirty kilometres (twenty miles) of RAAF Station Richmond, and incorporated a disused railway tunnel that offered, according to government correspondence, "complete protection from Atom Bomb attack".

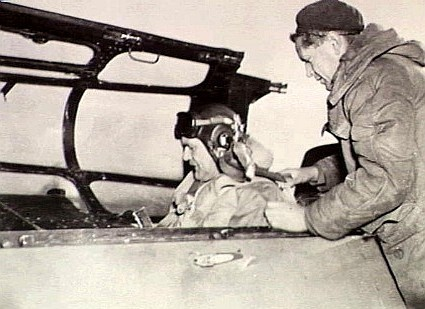
Bladin strapping into the rear seat of a Gloster Meteor during a visit to Korea, 1951

Bladin became Air Member for Personnel (AMP) on 24 November 1948; this position gave him a seat on the Air Board, which consisted of the RAAF's most senior officers and was chaired by the Chief of the Air Staff. He succeeded Hewitt, and worked to consolidate the innovations in Air Force education and training that the latter had initiated. RAAF Staff College opened in June 1949 at Point Cook, providing an advanced defence course aimed at squadron leaders and wing commanders; international facilities were also utilised to further officers' education. In October, Bladin became involved in the push for a training scheme to offer apprenticeships to clerical and supply staff, which was established two years later. He was appointed a Companion of the Order of the Bath in the King's Birthday Honours announced in June 1950.

In 1951, inspired by a similar initiative in state education, Bladin sponsored a move to have RAAF education officers augment their degree qualifications with formal teaching credentials. Over the following year, in response to increased demands for aircrew to meet Australia's commitments to the Malayan Emergency and the Korean War, pilot training was broken out from a single all-encompassing course at No. 1 Flying Training School (No. 1 FTS) in Point Cook, Victoria, into separate courses at the newly formed No. 1 Initial Flying Training School at Archerfield, Queensland, No. 1 Basic Flying Training School at Uranquinty, New South Wales, and No. 1 Applied Flying Training School (re-formed from No. 1 FTS) at Point Cook.

== Later life ==
Bladin retired from the Air Force on 15 October 1953, and was succeeded as AMP by Air Vice-Marshal Val Hancock. Shortly after leaving the Air Force, Bladin donated an eponymous trophy for the service's best-performing Avro Lincoln unit in bombing and aerial gunnery competition. He ran a grazing property, which he named Adastra, at Yass, just north of the Australian Capital Territory. Between 1951 and 1954, and again from 1956 to 1969, he also served as treasurer of the Returned Sailors', Soldiers' and Airmen's Imperial League of Australia, which became the Returned Services League in 1965. In the early 1960s he helped raise funds for building the Anzac Memorial Chapel of St Paul at his old college, Duntroon. Bladin died in Melbourne on 2 February 1978, survived by his three children. His wife, who was involved in the support of veterans' families and other community work, had died earlier. Accorded an Air Force funeral at the Church of Our Lady of Good Counsel in Deepdene, Bladin was buried at Springvale, Victoria.

== Notes ==
Military offices
Preceded by Air Commodore Douglas Wilson	Air Officer Commanding North-Western Area; 1942–1943	Succeeded by Air Vice-Marshal Adrian Cole
Preceded by Air Commodore John McCauley	Deputy Chief of the Air Staff; 1944–1946	Succeeded by Air Commodore John McCauley
Preceded by Air Commodore Leon Lachal	Air Officer Commanding Eastern Area; 1947–1948	Succeeded by Air Vice-Marshal John McCauley
Preceded by Air Vice-Marshal Joe Hewitt	Air Member for Personnel; 1948–1953	Succeeded by Air Vice-Marshal Valston Hancock
