= Mallala =

Mallala may refer to:

- District Council of Mallala, the former name of the Adelaide Plains Council, a local government area in South Australia
- Mallala, South Australia, a town on the northern Adelaide Plains
- Mallala Motor Sport Park, a motor racing circuit north of the town
- RAAF Base Mallala, the previous use of the site of the racing circuit
- Elfin Mallala, a sports racing car built in Australia

== See also ==
- Malala (disambiguation)
- Mallah (disambiguation)
