= No. 3 Service Flying Training School RAAF =

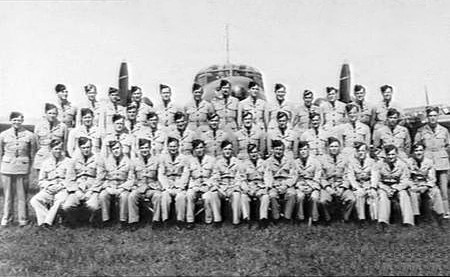
- Trainees of No. 3 Service Flying Training School in front of an Avro Anson
- Active: 1940–1942
- Allegiance: Australia
- Branch: Royal Australian Air Force
- Role: Intermediate/advanced flying training
- Garrison/HQ: RAAF Station Amberley

Commanders
- Notable commanders: Leon Lachal (1941–42)

No. 3 Service Flying Training School (No. 3 SFTS) was a flying training school of the Royal Australian Air Force (RAAF) during World War II. It was formed in September 1940, and commenced flying two months later. Responsible for intermediate and advanced instruction of pilots under the Empire Air Training Scheme (EATS), the school was based at RAAF Station Amberley, Queensland, and operated CAC Wirraway and Avro Anson aircraft. Two reserve squadrons were formed at the school in response to the outbreak of war in the Pacific, and the base fortified against air attack. In March 1942 the RAAF divided the staff and equipment of No. 3 SFTS between Nos. 1 and 6 Service Flying Training Schools at Point Cook, Victoria, and Mallala, South Australia, respectively. No. 3 SFTS was disbanded the following month.

== History ==
RAAF aircrew training expanded dramatically following the outbreak of World War II, in response to Australia's participation in the Empire Air Training Scheme (EATS). The Air Force's pre-war flight training facility, No. 1 Flying Training School at RAAF Station Point Cook, Victoria, was supplanted in 1940–41 by twelve Elementary Flying Training Schools (EFTS), eight Service Flying Training Schools (SFTS), and Central Flying School (CFS). While CFS turned out new flight instructors, the EFTS provided basic training to prospective pilots who, if successful, would go on to an SFTS for further instruction that focussed on operational (or "service") flying. The course at SFTS typically consisted of two streams, intermediate and advanced, and included such techniques as instrument flying, night flying, advanced aerobatics, formation flying, dive bombing, and aerial gunnery. The total duration of training varied during the war as demand for aircrew rose and fell. Initially running for 16 weeks, the course was cut to 10 weeks (which included 75 hours flying time) in October 1940. A year later it was raised to 12 weeks (including 100 hours flying time), and again to 16 weeks two months later. It continued to increase after this, peaking at 28 weeks in June 1944.

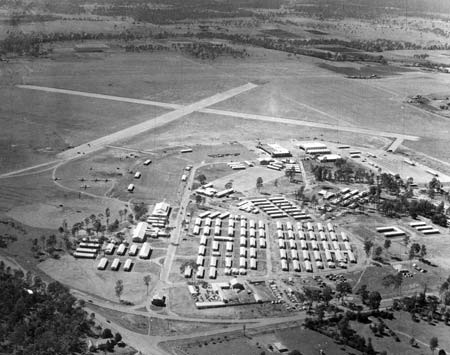
RAAF Station Amberley, home of No. 3 SFTS, 1940–42

No. 3 Service Flying Training School (No. 3 SFTS) was formed at RAAF Station Amberley, Queensland, on 21 September 1940. Its inaugural commanding officer was Wing Commander R.H. Simms. Amberley had only opened that year, and when the first course of flying training commenced with CAC Wirraways on 19 November, the aircraft were operating off a grass runway. This soon proved impractical owing to heavy downpours. To keep flying on schedule, No. 3 SFTS instituted a 13-hour training day coupled with nightly aircraft maintenance, and the Wirraways frequently used the airfields at nearby RAAF Stations Archerfield and Maryborough, homes of No. 2 Elementary Flying Training School and No. 3 Wireless Air Gunners School, respectively. The school also operated twin-engined Avro Ansons, on which training was hampered not only by the condition of the airfield but by shortages of aircraft and instructors. On 4 March 1941, two of the Ansons collided in mid-air near Casino, New South Wales, during a cross-country training flight. One of the Ansons crashed and the pilot was killed, though his co-pilot managed to bail out; the other Anson was only slightly damaged and landed at Casino Aerodrome.

Construction of all-weather runways at Amberley was complete by the end of August 1941, and 13 hangars had been erected by the beginning of October. Following the outbreak of the Pacific War in December 1941, the school's Ansons were formed into Nos. 66 and 67 Second Line (Reserve) Squadrons, and the base was fortified to help defend against potential air attacks. The same month, almost 1,000 United States Army Air Forces personnel arrived at Amberley to begin assembly of Douglas Dauntless dive bombers and Curtiss Kittyhawk fighters, under the supervision of Group Captain Leon Lachal, who had assumed command of No. 3 SFTS in April. On 15 February 1942, another Anson crashed, killing the pilot, after an apparent engine failure. The following month, the RAAF rationalised its EATS facilities, dividing the personnel and equipment of No. 3 SFTS between Nos. 1 and 6 Service Flying Training Schools at RAAF Stations Point Cook, Victoria, and Mallala, South Australia, respectively. The last course at No. 3 SFTS concluded on 30 March, and the school disbanded on 10 April 1942.
