= 70 Squadron =

70 Squadron or 70th Squadron may refer to:

- No. 70 Squadron RAAF, a unit of the Royal Australian Air Force
- 70th Squadron (Iraq), a unit of the Iraqi Air Force
- No. 70 Squadron RAF, a unit of the United Kingdom Royal Air Force
- 70th Fighter Squadron, a unit of the United States
