= John McCauley =

Royal Australian Air Force chief

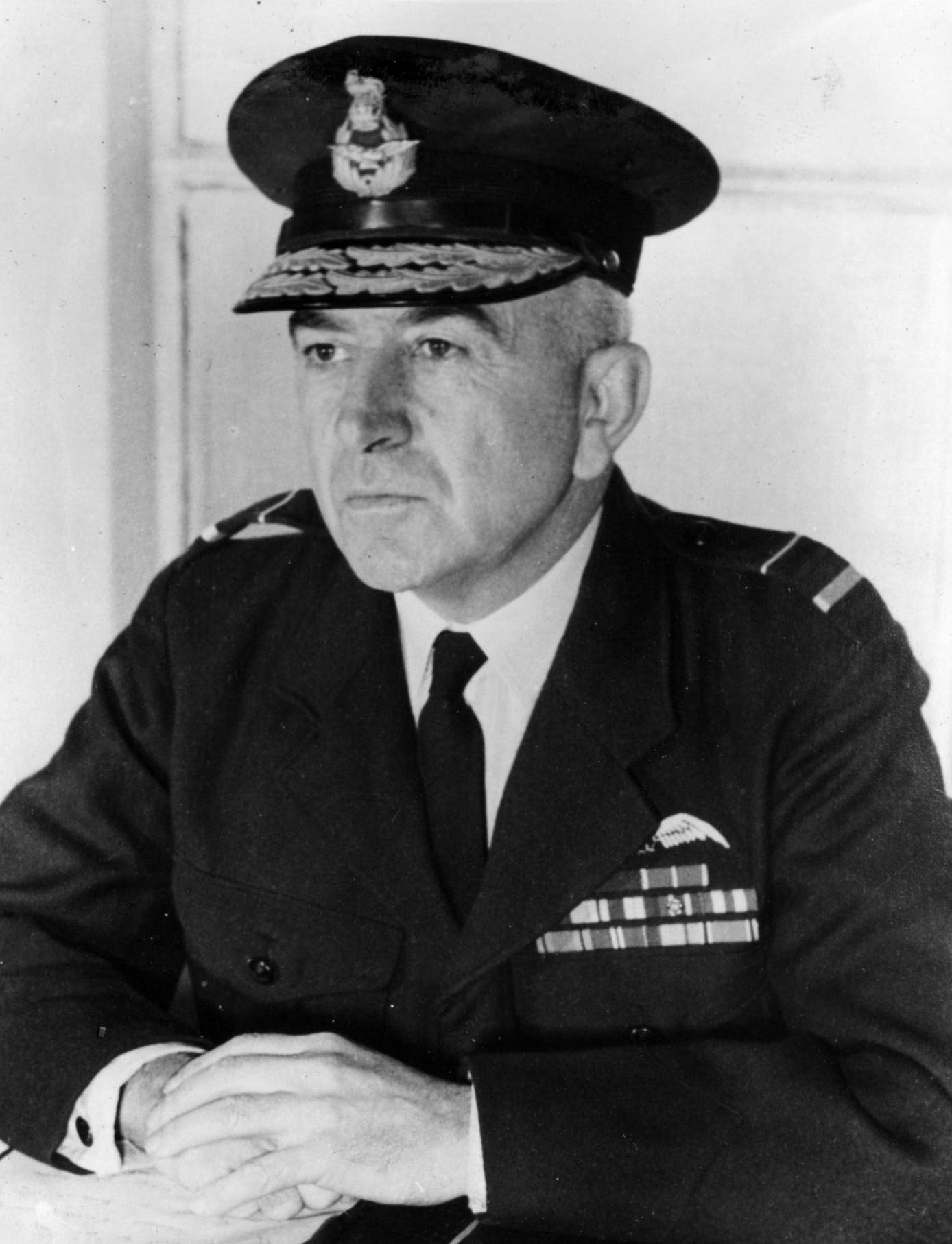
- Air Vice Marshal McCauley as AOC Eastern Area, 1953
- Born: 18 March 1899; Sydney
- Died: 3 February 1989 (aged 89); Sydney
- Military career
- Allegiance: Australia
- Branch: Permanent Military Forces; Royal Australian Air Force
- Service years: 1916–1957
- Rank: Air Marshal
- Nicknames: "Black Jack"; "Crasher"
- Units: 2nd Tactical Air Force RAF (1944–45); BCOF Japan (1947–49)
- Commands: No. 1 SFTS (1940–41); RAF Sembawang (1941–42); Eastern Area Command (1949–53); Home Command (1953–54); Chief of the Air Staff (1954–57)
- Conflicts: World War II; Pacific Theatre; Malayan Campaign; Battle of Singapore; European Theatre; Occupation of Japan
- Awards: Knight Commander of the Order of the British Empire; Companion of the Order of the Bath
- Other work: Air Force Association Federal President (1964–1974)

Air Marshal Sir John Patrick Joseph McCauley, KBE, CB (18 March 1899 – 3 February 1989) was a senior commander in the Royal Australian Air Force (RAAF). He served as Chief of the Air Staff from 1954 to 1957. A Duntroon graduate, McCauley spent four years in the Australian Military Forces before transferring to the RAAF in 1924. He was Director of Training from 1936 to 1938, and commanded engineering and flying training schools for the first eighteen months of World War II. Having been promoted to group captain in 1940, he was posted to Singapore in June 1941 to take charge of all RAAF units defending the area. He earned praise for his efforts in attacking invading Japanese forces before the fall of Singapore, and for his dedication in evacuating his men. After serving as Deputy Chief of the Air Staff in 1942–1944, he was appointed to a senior operational role with the Royal Air Force's 2nd Tactical Air Force in Europe, where he saw out the rest of the war.

Following the end of hostilities, McCauley again became Deputy Chief of the Air Staff. In 1947 he was promoted to air vice marshal and appointed Chief of Staff at British Commonwealth Occupation Force Headquarters in Japan. Returning to Australia in June 1949, he served as the last Air Officer Commanding (AOC) Eastern Area and the inaugural AOC Home Command (now Air Command). Raised to air marshal, he took up the position of Chief of the Air Staff in January 1954, and was knighted a year later. During his tenure in the RAAF's senior role, McCauley focused on potential deployments to Southeast Asia—particularly Vietnam—and threats from the north, commencing redevelopment of RAAF Base Darwin and recommending purchase of a light supersonic bomber to replace the Air Force's English Electric Canberra. After retiring from military life in March 1957, he chaired community and welfare organisations, serving as Federal President of the Air Force Association for ten years. He died in Sydney in 1989, aged 89.

== Early career ==
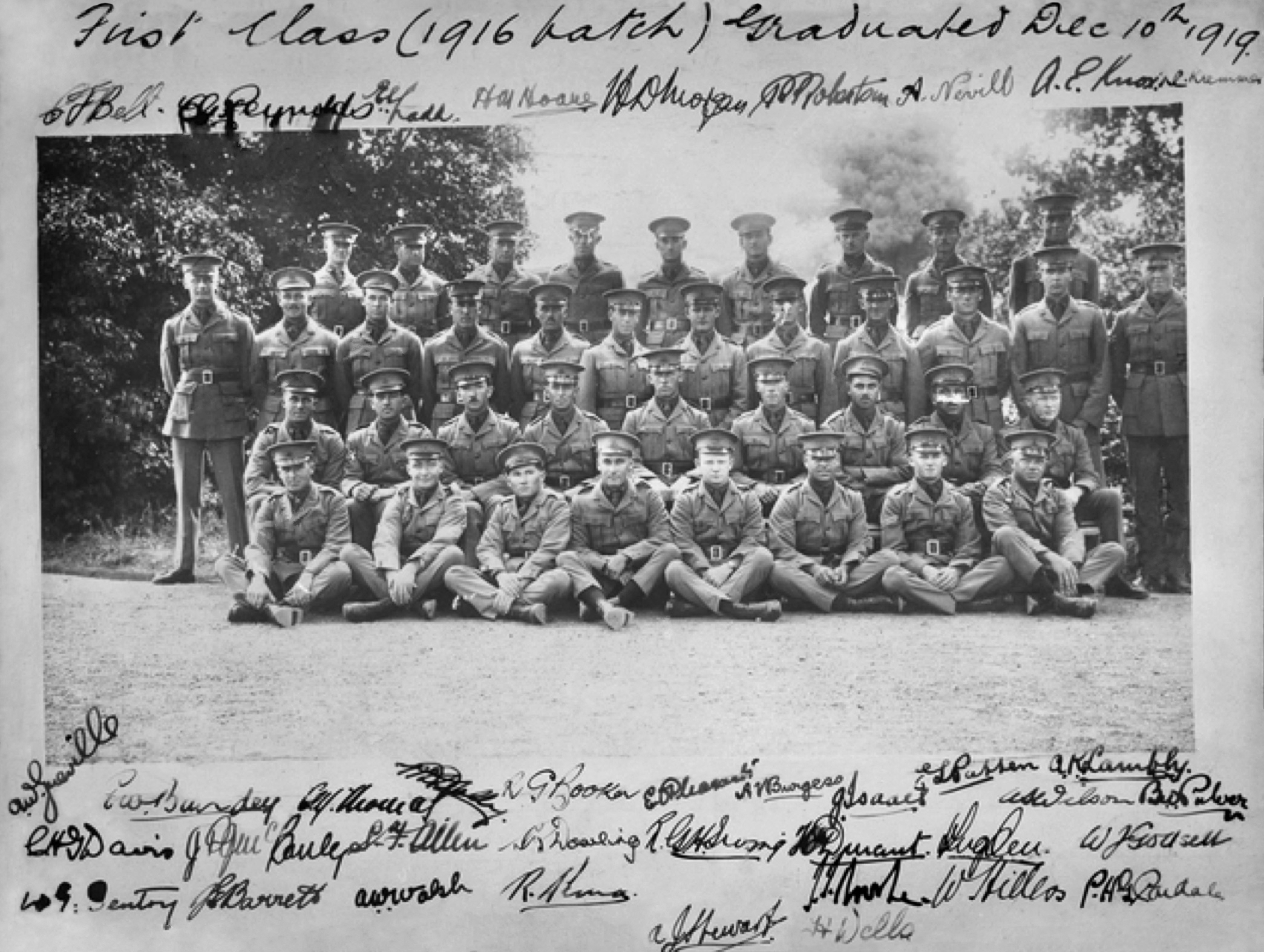
McCauley (second from left, second row) with fellow cadets in his graduation class at the Royal Military College, Duntroon, December 1919

Born in Sydney on 18 March 1899, McCauley went to school at St Joseph's College, Hunters Hill, before entering the Royal Military College, Duntroon, in 1916. He graduated as a lieutenant in 1919, and spent the next four years in staff positions with the Permanent Military Forces, including a posting to Britain. In January 1924, he transferred to the Royal Australian Air Force as a flying officer, undertaking the pilots' course at RAAF Point Cook, Victoria. He was nicknamed "Black Jack" in tribute to his dark looks, but a "shaky reputation" as an aviator also earned him the epithet "Crasher". On 10 November 1925, he married Murielle Burke; the couple had a son and two daughters. By 1926, McCauley was back in Britain, studying at the Royal Naval College, Greenwich, and the RAF Armament and Gunnery School. He returned to Australia in 1928, and was assigned to the staff of RAAF Headquarters, Melbourne.

Promoted to squadron leader, McCauley was posted a third time to Britain in 1933, graduating from RAF Staff College, Andover, and qualifying as a flight instructor at Central Flying School, Wittering. The following year he was attached to the Air Ministry in London. Returning to Australia in 1935, McCauley joined the RAAF's Directorate of Training. That September, he initiated a requirement for all air bases to draw up plans for local defence. He also inaugurated operational-level policy for the Air Force, ordering units to draft doctrine relevant to their combat roles, such as "Striking" for No. 1 Squadron and "Army Co-operation" for No. 3 Squadron. Described as "a great leader, with a great deal of force", McCauley took over as Director of Training in 1936. He gained his Bachelor of Commerce degree at Melbourne University the same year, having studied part-time since 1929. His tertiary qualification was unusual for a general duties officer in the pre-war Air Force, whose pilots, according to RAAF historian Alan Stephens, generally "valued little beyond flying ability". By 1939 he had been raised to wing commander and was commanding officer and chief flying instructor of the cadet wing at Point Cook.

== World War II ==
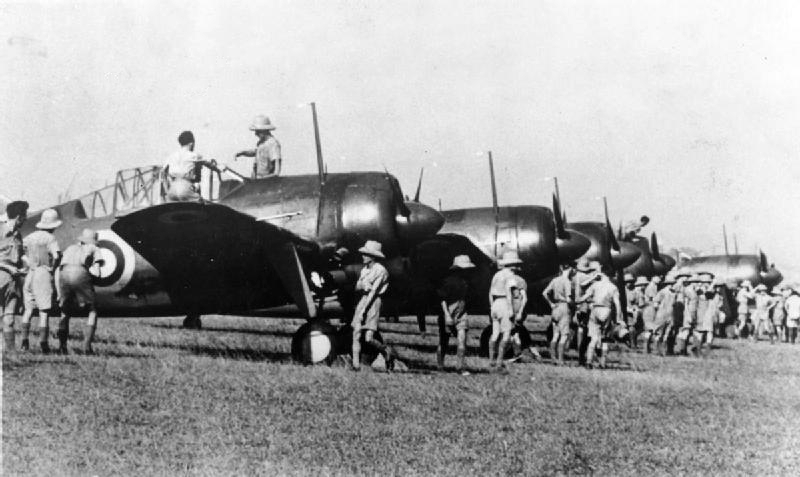
RAAF Brewster Buffalos at Singapore's Sembawang air base, commanded by Group Captain McCauley, October 1941

McCauley's seniority and instructional experience kept him in Australia on training assignments for the first eighteen months of World War II. From March to October 1940, he served as the inaugural commander of No. 1 Engineering School at Ascot Vale, Victoria. Promoted to group captain, he then took over No. 1 Service Flying Training School at Point Cook until July 1941, when he handed over to Wing Commander Elwyn King. During McCauley's tenure, the number of aircraft operated by the school doubled from its initial complement of 52, and monthly flying hours increased from fewer than 1,000 to more than 1,800.

During the Malayan Campaign in 1941–42, McCauley was in charge of RAAF units under Britain's Far East Air Force (FEAF). As station commander at RAF Sembawang in north-east Singapore from August 1941, he personally supervised the training and operations of Nos. 1 and 8 Squadrons, flying Lockheed Hudson light bombers. He also warned Air Chief Marshal Sir Robert Brooke-Popham, the FEAF's Commander-in-Chief, of the weaknesses of the Allied air defences. Deployed to forward bases on the Malay Peninsula, McCauley's Hudsons were the first Allied aircraft to spot Japanese troop transports converging off Indochina on 6 December, and they attacked the fleet in the face of heavy defensive fire. By Christmas, as the Allies retreated from Malaya, Sembawang was "the busiest airfield on Singapore island", with two Dutch Glenn Martin bomber squadrons as well as the remnants of the Hudson units, along with Nos. 21 and 453 Squadrons (merged due to losses as No. 21/453 Squadron), operating obsolescent Brewster Buffalos. On 29 January 1942, McCauley took over airfield P.2 near Palembang in Sumatra, commanding all Commonwealth air operations emanating from the base. With his available aircraft augmented by Hawker Hurricanes and Bristol Blenheims, he conducted attacks on enemy convoys before evacuating the area on 15 February 1942, the day that Singapore surrendered. After communications between himself and local RAF group headquarters were cut, McCauley was left to his own devices to make final arrangements for the demolition of equipment and departure of staff. He had earlier intervened to prevent RAF headquarters from dissolving No. 21 Squadron and using its personnel as a labour force on Sumatra, instead arranging their transport as a unit to Batavia, where they subsequently embarked for Australia. McCauley led the last party to depart Palembang, and was praised for organising the safe passage back to Australia of many Commonwealth air force personnel.

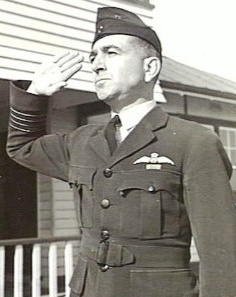
Group Captain McCauley, 1943

After his return to Australia late in February 1942, McCauley briefly served as Senior Air Staff Officer at North-Western Area Headquarters in Darwin, Northern Territory. He took up the position of Deputy Chief of the Air Staff (DCAS) in May, and was appointed a Commander of the Order of the British Empire (CBE) in the 1943 King's Birthday Honours, promulgated on 2 June. The honour recognised the "courage, ability, and qualities of leadership" he displayed under "trying and difficult conditions during a period of service in the Far East". The following month, he was promoted to temporary air commodore. During an inspection of No. 10 Group at Nadzab in March 1944, McCauley learned that unless the Australian formation was able to increase its operational rate of effort, its units would be withdrawn from their forward airfields. As a result, RAAF Headquarters increased the supply of pilots and equipment to the group, which was then able to meet, and later exceed, the rate of effort achieved by comparable US Fifth Air Force units. At around this time, he also instigated a research program to determine a suitable formula for rotating and relieving ground staff, as well as aircrew, in the tropics.

Completing his term as DCAS, McCauley was posted to the European theatre in November 1944, serving for the remainder of the war as Air Commodore (Operations), 2nd Tactical Air Force RAF (2nd TAF). The British had actively sought him for this particular appointment, which he commenced in December at the formation's Brussels headquarters. The role involved him in the direction of over 70 Commonwealth and European squadrons in operations against Germany, and was "unique" for an RAAF officer during the war. He left 2nd TAF in July 1945 and returned to Australia later that year.

== Post-war career ==
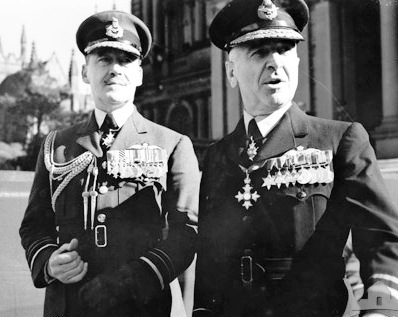
Air Vice Marshal McCauley (right) as AOC Eastern Area with the Chief of the Air Staff, Air Marshal Hardman, at a parade by No. 78 Wing shortly before its departure for garrison duties in Malta, July 1952

Among a small coterie of wartime RAAF commanders earmarked for further senior roles, McCauley retained his rank of air commodore following the cessation of hostilities. He served again as Deputy Chief of the Air Staff in 1946–47. Promoted to air vice marshal, he was chief of staff to Lieutenant General Horace Robertson at British Commonwealth Occupation Force Headquarters in Japan from June 1947 to June 1949. In this post he was preceded and succeeded by two other Duntroon graduates, Air Vice Marshals Frank Bladin and Alan Charlesworth respectively. Upon his return to Australia, McCauley was made Air Officer Commanding Eastern Area. During the Malayan Emergency, he formed RAAF aircraft assigned for deployment into No. 90 (Composite) Wing, as directed by Chief of the Air Staff Air Marshal George Jones, to ensure that they would operate with a degree of autonomy rather than be dispersed throughout other Allied groups. He was appointed a Companion of the Order of the Bath (CB) in the 1951 Birthday Honours.

In January 1952, Air Marshal Jones was succeeded by Air Marshal Sir Donald Hardman of the Royal Air Force. The decision by Prime Minister Robert Menzies to appoint a British officer as CAS caused controversy in Australia, compounded by his stated reason that there was "no RAAF officer of sufficient age, or operational experience, to take the post of Chief of the Air Staff", which ignored the wartime records of figures like McCauley. Hardman changed the structure of the Air Force from one based on geographical area to one based on function, hence McCauley's Eastern Area Command evolved into Home Command (now Air Command) in 1953. Promoted to air marshal, McCauley took over from Hardman as Chief of the Air Staff when the latter's two-year appointment ended in January 1954. According to the official history of the post-war RAAF, McCauley was "just as ready to become CAS in 1952 as he was in 1954", and a contemporary observer declared that "seldom has a better-equipped officer led a branch of the Australian services". He was the first of four former Duntroon cadets to successively head up the Air Force between 1954 and 1969, followed by Air Marshals Frederick Scherger, Valston Hancock, and Alister Murdoch.

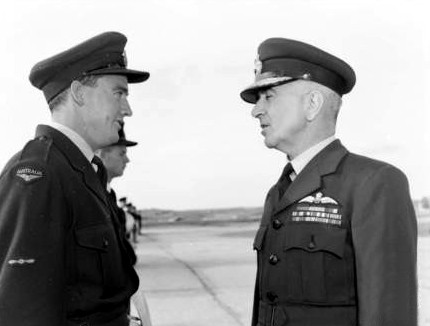
Air Marshal McCauley (right) as Chief of the Air Staff, visiting No. 78 Wing in Malta shortly before its return to Australia, December 1954

McCauley was raised to Knight Commander of the Order of the British Empire (KBE) in the 1955 New Year Honours. In October 1956, he gave a presentation on air power concepts that was attended by Prime Minister Menzies, as well as the other Australian service chiefs. McCauley identified Malaya and Indochina, particularly Vietnam, as likely areas for future RAAF deployments, advocating a continued presence in Singapore in view of its strategic importance to the defence of Australia, as he had witnessed first-hand during World War II. He also recommended that a supersonic light bomber replace the straight-winged and obsolescent English Electric Canberra, primarily for interdiction in Southeast Asia. McCauley's tenure as CAS saw the beginning of a trend for the RAAF to equip with US aircraft types in preference to British types, with recommendations being put forward for the F-104 Starfighter (though in the event the French Dassault Mirage III was purchased) and C-130 Hercules. This stemmed partly from his inspection of Allied air force units during the Korean War, when he observed that those employing American hardware were far better served with spare parts and replacement aircraft than those with British equipment. Some of his senior commanders had urged replacing the Canberra with Avro Vulcan heavy bombers, but McCauley did not pursue this option, preferring to concentrate in the short term on new fighter technology. He also made a point of supporting the Australian aircraft industry wherever feasible.

McCauley instigated the redevelopment of RAAF Base Darwin in the Northern Territory as the first stage of a forward defence strategy. He aimed to make Darwin the "main Australian base for war" and a launching point for deployments to Southeast Asia, rather than simply a transit station. Over the next ten years, No. 5 Airfield Construction Squadron transformed the base's runways, buildings and other infrastructure into a modern facility capable of handling major operations. This concept was taken another step by McCauley's successor as CAS, Air Marshal Scherger, who conceived a series of front-line "bare bases" across Northern Australia, beginning with plans for RAAF Base Tindal in 1959. Alan Stephens later described McCauley and Scherger as "among the RAAF's better chiefs".

== Later life ==
After his retirement from the RAAF on 18 March 1957, McCauley became active in community welfare organisations, chairing campaigns for the National Heart Foundation, Freedom From Hunger, the Royal Humane Society, and the Cancer Council in the late 1950s and early 1960s. From 1964 until 1974, he served as Federal President of the Air Force Association. In this role he endorsed the initial proposal, featuring monumental statues of airmen and ground crew, for the Royal Australian Air Force Memorial to be located on Anzac Parade, Canberra. The design ultimately approved by the final selection panel was an abstract sculpture that was subsequently described as reflecting a "comprehensive failure to understand the nature of air force service". McCauley visited RAAF units in Vietnam in October 1966. In 1970, he played a leading role in organising the Australian Services Council (later the Australian Veterans and Defence Services Council) to co-ordinate lobbying efforts for veterans' groups, and became its first chairman. He was also President of the Good Neighbour Council of New South Wales from 1966 to 1975.

McCauley died in Sydney's St Vincent's Hospital on 3 February 1989, following a stroke. Aged 89, he was survived by his three children; his wife had died two years earlier. He was buried in Northern Suburbs Cemetery.

== Notes ==
Military offices
Vacant Title last held by William Bostock in 1941^{1}	Deputy Chief of the Air Staff; 1942–1944	Succeeded by Frank Bladin
Preceded by Frank Bladin	Deputy Chief of the Air Staff; 1946–1947	Succeeded by Frederick Scherger
Preceded by Frank Bladin	Chief of Staff British Commonwealth Occupation Force; 1947–1949	Succeeded by Alan Charlesworth
Preceded by Frank Bladin	Air Officer Commanding Eastern Area Command; Redesignated Home Command in 1953; 1949–1954	Succeeded by Allan Walters
Preceded by Sir Donald Hardman	Chief of the Air Staff; 1954–1957	Succeeded by Sir Frederick Scherger
Notes and references
1. Gillison, Royal Australian Air Force, p. 479
