= Elfin Mallala =

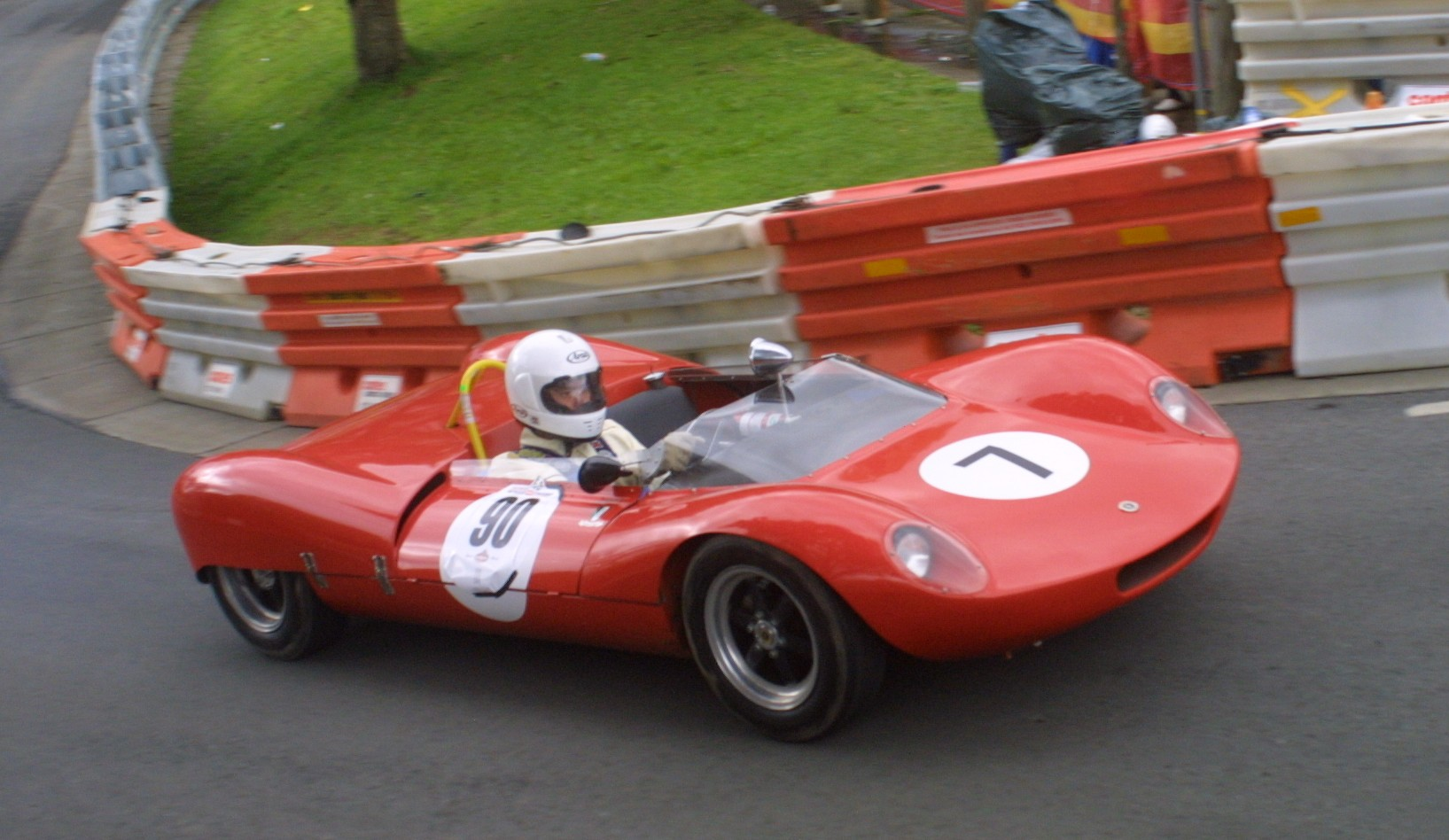

Overview
- Manufacturer: Elfin Cars
- Production: 1963; 5
- Designer: Garrie Cooper

Body and chassis
- Class: Sports Racing Car

Powertrain
- Engine: 1600 cc 110.4 kW

Dimensions
- Length: 3,040 mm (119.7 in)
- Width: 1,960 mm (77.2 in)
- Curb weight: 408.2 kg (899.9 lb)

The Elfin Mallala was a sports racing car produced in 1962 and 1963 by Garrie Cooper's Elfin Sports Cars. It had a small run of only five cars. Its first race was at the Mallala Race Circuit which gave its name to the car. It has the historical distinction of being the first Australian built racing car to race in England.

== Cars ==
Elfin Mallala chassis
	Chassis	Engine	Team	Owners / Drivers	Class
1	S6311	Ford 116E	Scuderia Veloce	David McKay; Greg Cusack; Denis Geary; Leigh Bayley (1967- 1970; Peter Goodwin (1970)	
2	S6315	Ford Consul		Brian Morrell Graeme Henderson	
3	S6316	Climax 2.4 L		Brian Thompson Graeme Wright	
4	S6317	Lotus 1.6 L Climax 2.0 L Ford Cortina 1.1 L		Greville Edgerton (1963) Charlie Occhipinti (1967); Steven O'Callaghan (1971); Murray Richards; Brian Ax (1988)	1100 cc Sports Car class
5	S6418	Lotus 1.6 L		Henri Leroux (South Africa) Stephen Knox (Aust); Shairon Beale (USA)	

== Technical specifications and features ==
=== Drivetrain ===
- mid mounted 4 cylinder, 1600 cc engine
- From 110.4 kW (150 PS; 148 hp)
- 5 speed gearbox

=== Suspension ===
- Front: Tubular wishbones, coil/shock absorbers, 12.7 mm (0.5 in) non-adjustable anti-roll bar
- Rear: Reversed lower wishbones, driveshaft top link, trailing radius arms

Exceptions were:

chassis 6318: tubular top link, splined driveshaft
chassis 6316: tubular top link, drive shafts with rubber doughnuts

=== Brakes ===
- Front: 240 mm (9.4 in) discs
- Rear: 216 mm (8.5 in) drums

The last three cars had discs on all four wheels.

=== Wheels/Tyres ===
- 13" wheels

=== Construction ===
- Aluminium body panels, fiberglass nose and tail. (The first car aluminium nose and tail).
- Space frame chassis

=== Dimensions ===
- Length 3,040 mm (119.7 in)
- Front Track 1,080 mm (42.5 in)
- Rear Track 1,060 mm (41.7 in)
- Wheelbase 1,960 mm (77.2 in)
- Kerb Weight 408 kg (899 lb)

== See also ==
- Mallala (disambiguation)
