= Terowie railway station =

Former railway station in South Australia, Australia

Terowie
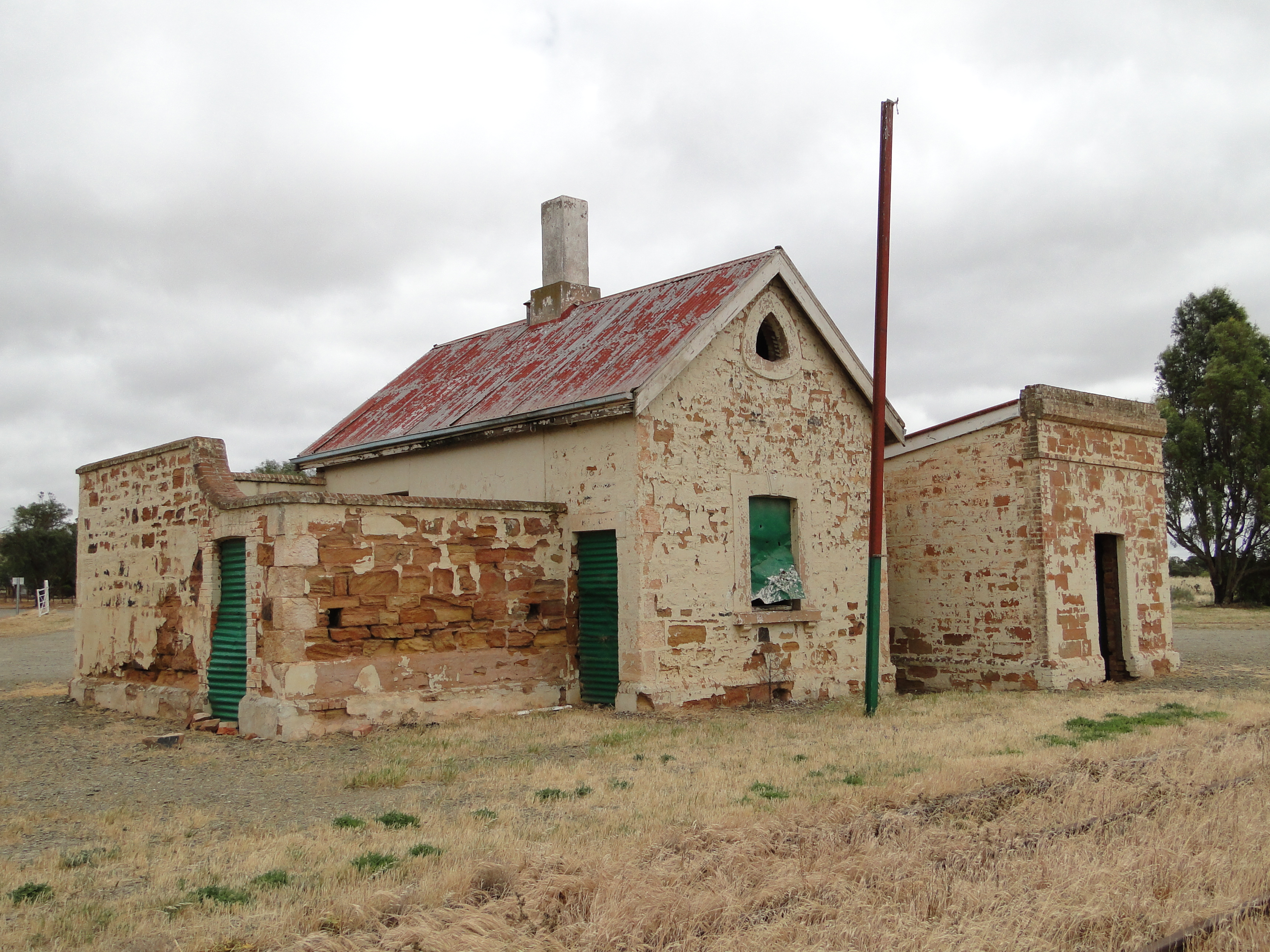
- Remaining parts of the Terowie station building in 2013. Subsequently they have been externally restored.

General information
- Coordinates: 33.1505°S 138.9212°E
- Operator: South Australian Railways, Australian National Railways Commission
- Line: Peterborough railway line
- Distance: 221 kilometres from Adelaide
- Platforms: 1

Construction
- Structure type: Ground

Other information
- Status: Closed

History
- Opened: 1880
- Closed: December 1986

Services
Preceding station	Australian National Railways Commission	Following station
Whyte Yarcowie towards Adelaide	Roseworthy-Peterborough railway line	Gumbowie towards Peterborough
Location

Terowie railway station was located on the Roseworthy–Peterborough line in the South Australian town of Terowie.

== History ==
Terowie station opened in 1880 when the broad gauge line from Adelaide was completed. In 1881, it became a junction station when the narrow gauge line from Peterborough opened. This resulted in Terowie becoming an important transshipment point on the South Australian Railways network.

The opening of the Trans-Australian Railway in 1917 further increased the amount of traffic, this ceased operating via Terowie in 1937 when the Adelaide to Redhill line was extended to Port Pirie. With the opening of the Leigh Creek Coalfield in the 1940s, the volume of freight transhipped increased again. This ceased with the opening of the Stirling North to Marree line on 27 July 1957. As part of the conversion of the Port Augusta to Broken Hill line to standard gauge, the line north of Terowie to Peterborough was converted to broad gauge on 12 January 1970, thus making Peterborough the break of gauge point.

The station closed for regular passenger use on 13 December 1986. The last passenger train, a Steamrail Victoria tour using Victorian locomotive R761 used the station on 6 June 1987. The line through Terowie was taken up in 1992/93.

== General Douglas MacArthur monument ==
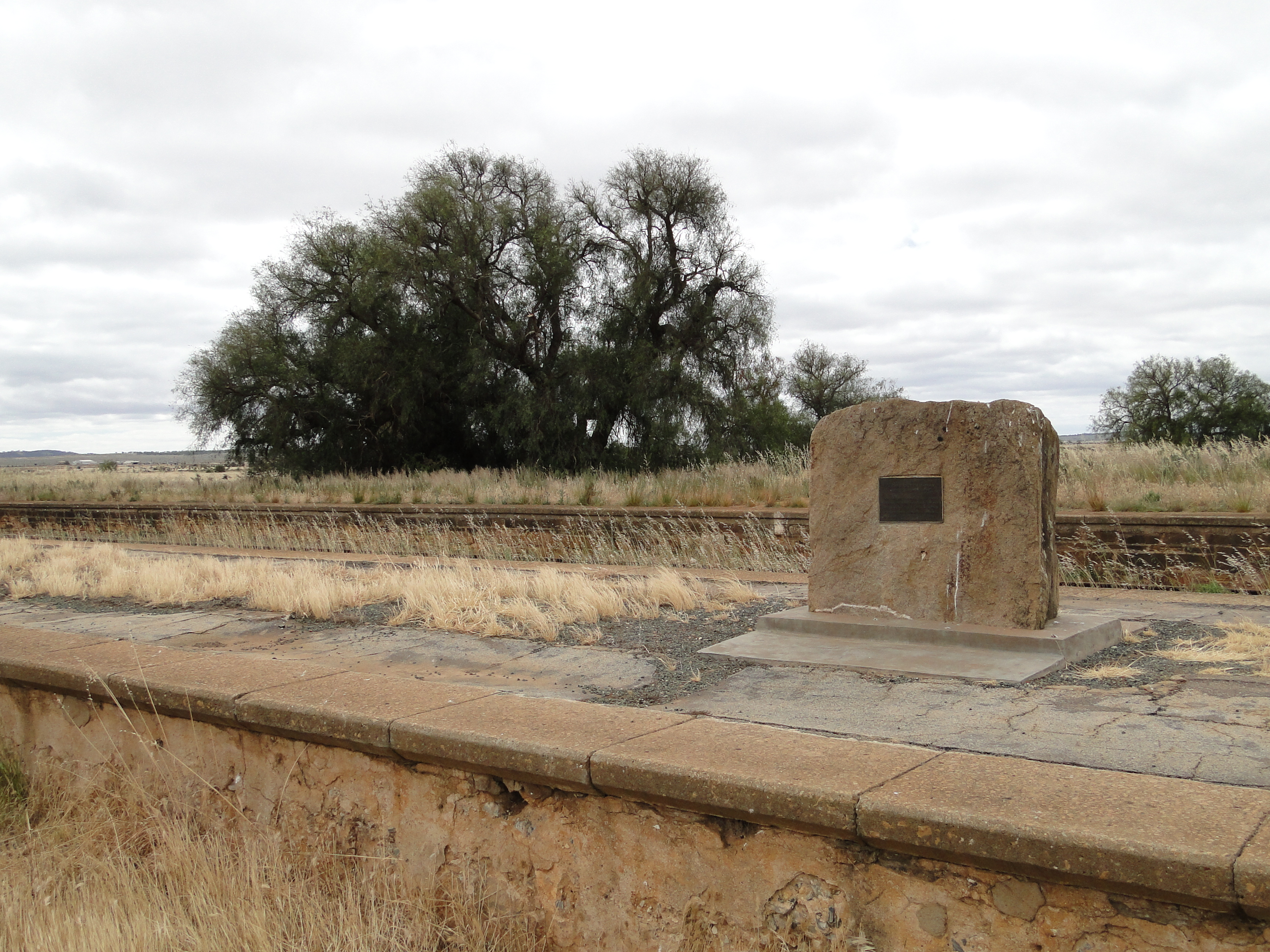
Douglas MacArthur monument

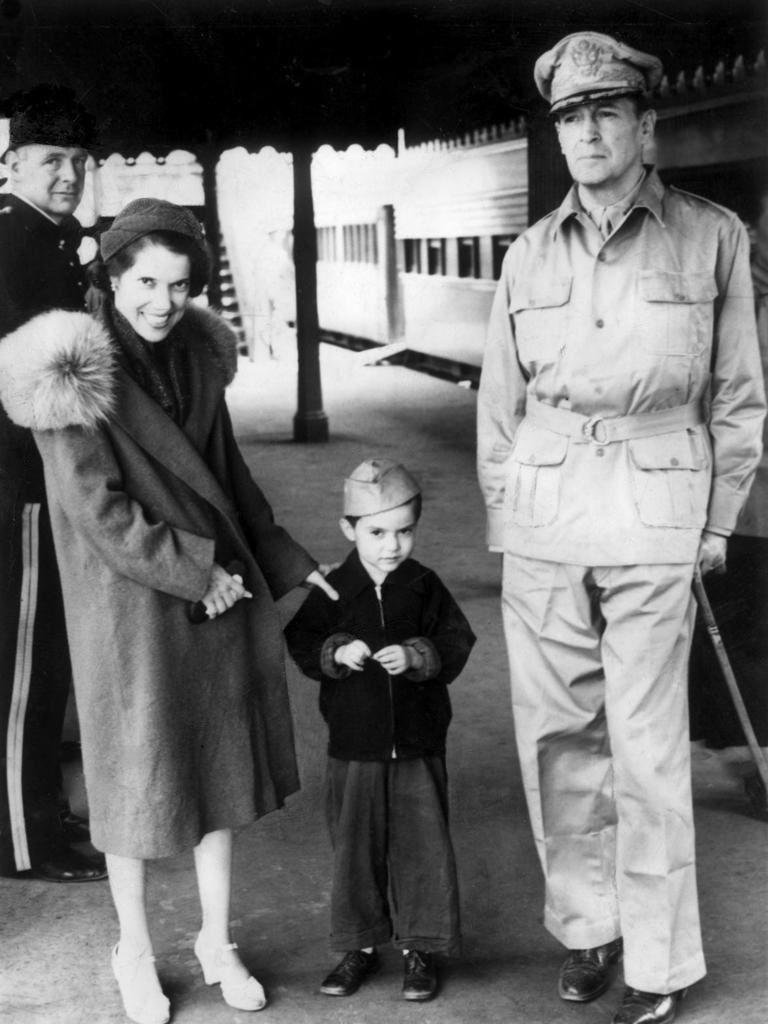
General Douglas MacArthur, his wife Jean and son Arthur on 20 March 1942 at Terowie railway station, where they had to change from a narrow-gauge train to a broad-gauge train on their journey from The Philippines to Melbourne. Here he made his much-publicised remark, "I shall return".

While changing trains in Terowie on 20 March 1942, United States General Douglas MacArthur was interviewed by two journalists from the Adelaide Advertiser newspaper regarding the Battle of the Philippines. He said: "The President of the United States ordered me to break through the Japanese lines and proceed from Corregidor to Australia for the purpose, as I understand it, of organising an American offensive against Japan, the primary purpose of which is the relief of the Philippines. I came through and I shall return". The following morning the Advertiser printed the interview with MacArthur under the headline: "I Shall Return." MacArthur used the phrase repeatedly in his press releases until his return to Manila in February 1945. The event is commemorated by a plaque on the platform (which misquotes his remark).

== See also ==
- Naval Base Adelaide
