= Alan Charlesworth =

Royal Australian Air Force senior commander (1903–1978)

Alan Moorhouse Charlesworth
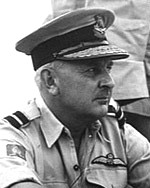
- Air Commodore Charlesworth in Japan, c. 1949
- Born: 17 September 1904; Lottah, Tasmania
- Died: 21 September 1978 (aged 75); Glen Iris, Victoria
- Military career
- Allegiance: Australia
- Branch: Australian Army; Royal Australian Air Force
- Service years: 1920–55
- Rank: Air Vice Marshal
- Units: 2nd Light Horse Regiment (1924); No. 1 Squadron (1925–28, 1930–32, 1934–39); No. 2 Group (1939–40); BCOF (1949–51)
- Commands: No. 2 Squadron (1939); RAAF Station Pearce (1940–41); Eastern Area Command (1943–44, 1946); North-Western Area Command (1944–46); School of Land/Air Warfare (1947–49); RAAF Station Williamtown (1949); Southern Area Command (1951–53); RAAF Overseas Headquarters (1954–55)
- Conflicts: World War II; South West Pacific Theatre; North Western Area Campaign; Korean War
- Awards: Commander of the Order of the British Empire; Air Force Cross
- Other work: Director of Recruiting; Supreme court judge's associate

Air Vice Marshal Alan Moorhouse Charlesworth, CBE, AFC (17 September 1903 – 21 September 1978) was a senior commander in the Royal Australian Air Force (RAAF). Born in Tasmania, he graduated from the Royal Military College, Duntroon, and served with the 2nd Light Horse Regiment in Queensland before transferring to the Air Force in 1925. Most of his pre-war flying career was spent with No. 1 Squadron at RAAF Station Laverton, Victoria. In 1932 he undertook a series of survey flights around Australia, earning the Air Force Cross. Charlesworth's early wartime commands included No. 2 Squadron at Laverton, and RAAF Station Pearce in Western Australia. Appointed Air Officer Commanding (AOC) Eastern Area in December 1943, he was promoted temporary air commodore the following year and took over as AOC North-Western Area in Darwin, Northern Territory.

Charlesworth's control of air operations during the North-Western Area Campaign led to his appointment as a Commander of the Order of the British Empire following the end of World War II. Retaining his wartime rank, he took charge of the newly formed School of Land/Air Warfare from 1947 until 1949, when he assumed command of RAAF Station Williamtown, New South Wales. He was posted to Japan later that year as Chief of Staff, British Commonwealth Occupation Force, and organised support for RAAF units involved in the Korean War. Returning to Australia in 1951, he was raised to acting air vice marshal and became AOC Southern Area. Charlesworth's final appointment before retiring from the Air Force was commanding RAAF Overseas Headquarters, London, in 1954–55. After leaving the military he served as Director of Recruiting in the late 1950s, and later as a judge's associate at the Supreme Court of Victoria. He died at his home in Glen Iris, Victoria, in 1978.

== Early career ==
Born in Lottah, Tasmania, on 17 September 1903, Alan Charlesworth was the son of a storeman, Edwin Charlesworth, and his wife Louisa. The youth attended Lottah Public School and St Virgil's College, Hobart, before entering the Royal Military College, Duntroon, in 1920. He won the Silver Boomerang trophy, awarded to the college's champion athlete, three years running in 1921–23. In 1923 he was appointed company sergeant major at Duntroon, and received the Sword of Honour upon graduating as a lieutenant later that year. Following service as adjutant and quartermaster with the 2nd Light Horse Regiment in Queensland, Charlesworth transferred to the Royal Australian Air Force (RAAF) as a flying officer on 27 January 1925. Among his classmates on the 1925 pilots' course at Point Cook, Victoria, was fellow Duntroon graduate Frederick Scherger. During a training flight on 25 March, Charlesworth's Avro 504K stalled and spun into a field, injuring him and killing his instructor. Recovering, he was subsequently involved in an accident with future lieutenant general and Governor of New South Wales Eric Woodward, when their plane flipped on landing and came to rest upside down on a fence; neither man was badly hurt.

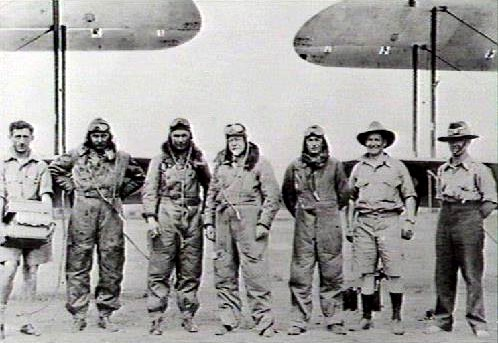
Flight Lieutenant Charlesworth (far left) with Doctor Woolnough (centre) and other members of the Commonwealth geographical aerial survey of Australia, July–September 1932

Charlesworth graduated as a pilot in July 1925, and was posted to No. 1 Squadron at RAAF Station Laverton, Victoria. In January 1926, he took part in experiments to test parachutes by attaching them to dummies and throwing them out of aircraft in flight. His secondment to the Air Force was made permanent in January 1928, and he was promoted to flight lieutenant the following month. On 30 April, Charlesworth married Edith Bennett at All Saints Anglican Church, St Kilda; the couple had a daughter. The next month, he was posted to the United Kingdom on attachment to the Royal Air Force (RAF). He attended the RAF School of Photography at Farnborough, before serving with the RAF Survey Flight in British Somaliland during 1929–30.

Returning to Australia, Charlesworth was again posted to No. 1 Squadron, taking command of a round-Australia aerial survey conducted in three phases during 1932 in association with the Commonwealth Geologist, Doctor Walter Woolnough. Charlesworth's study in Britain and his experience in Somaliland had made him the RAAF's leading expert in photographic reconnaissance, which was to be utilised in the search for potential oil fields. The first phase of the survey took place in January–February, employing two Westland Wapitis and seven other Air Force personnel from Nos. 1 and 3 Squadrons to photograph sites in southern Queensland. Despite both aircraft being damaged in a gale at Bourke in northern New South Wales while returning to base, the expedition was considered a success. For the second phase, lasting from July to September, Charlesworth and his team journeyed around the whole of Australia from New South Wales to Queensland, thence to the Northern Territory and Western Australia, before returning to Laverton. The final phase in December explored Tasmania. Charlesworth was awarded the Air Force Cross (AFC) for his leadership of the survey, described in the official history of the pre-war RAAF as a "milestone" in the country's exploration.

Following his survey work, Charlesworth was appointed Staff Officer Photography at RAAF Headquarters, Melbourne. In 1934 he returned to Laverton to take up his third and final posting with No. 1 Squadron. By September 1937, he had been raised to squadron leader and was in temporary command of the unit. He had overall charge of a training flight in November–December that ended in disaster, when a Hawker Demon crashed near Cootamundra, New South Wales, and its pilot burned to death; this was one of a spate of incidents during the year that led to serious questions being raised about the level of flying safety in the RAAF. In March 1939, Charlesworth was raised to wing commander and took command of No. 2 Squadron, operating Avro Ansons out of Laverton.

== World War II ==
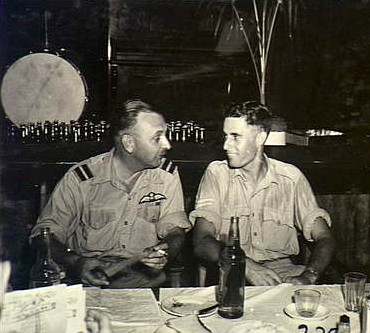
Air Commodore Charlesworth (left) and an RAAF corporal at a combined dinner in the officers mess at Port Moresby, New Guinea, c. 1944

As part of the RAAF's reorganisation following the outbreak of World War II in September 1939, No. 2 Group was formed in Sydney on 20 November; Charlesworth was appointed its Senior Air Staff Officer (SASO). He continued to serve in this position when the group was re-formed as Central Area in March 1940. Posted to Western Australia to take command of RAAF Station Pearce in August, he was promoted to temporary group captain on 1 September 1940. He became Senior Administration Officer at the newly established Western Area, Perth, in January the following year. In September 1942, Charlesworth took over No. 2 Bombing and Gunnery School in Sale, Victoria. He handed over to Group Captain Charles "Moth" Eaton in August 1943, before briefly taking charge of RAAF Headquarters Forward Echelon in Brisbane. Charlesworth was appointed Air Officer Commanding (AOC) Eastern Area, headquartered at Bradfield Park, Sydney, in December 1943. Eastern Area was responsible for maritime patrol and anti-submarine warfare off the coast of New South Wales and southern Queensland. Japanese submarine activity had decreased in the months before Charlesworth took command, and he was concerned that Allied ships were becoming complacent. He observed "a general slackening off in procedure; ships are seldom where they should be, and a minority of merchant ships identify themselves to aircraft". The RAAF's patrols had also settled into a predictable pattern that would have been easy for an observant submarine captain to avoid.

Charlesworth was promoted to temporary air commodore on 1 August 1944. The following month he was appointed AOC North-Western Area (NWA) in Darwin, Northern Territory, replacing Air Vice Marshal Adrian Cole. By this stage of the war, the Allies were advancing north and the tempo of operations in the Darwin area had slackened. Charlesworth immediately raised concerns regarding No. 80 Wing, which operated three squadrons of Spitfire fighters, warning higher command that its morale could drop if it was not either given a more active role in the war or transferred to southern Australia for rest. By October, the wing had received orders to depart NWA for the forward base of Morotai to join the RAAF's main mobile strike force, First Tactical Air Force; this would leave Charlesworth with twelve squadrons at his disposal, including one B-24 Liberator heavy bomber unit and three other Spitfire squadrons. In the meantime, NWA supported the assault on Leyte with attacks on enemy ports, oil facilities, and shipping in the Dutch East Indies using Beaufighters, B-25 Mitchells, and Liberators. These operations continued through November–December. In April 1945, Charlesworth sent Mitchells and Liberators against a Japanese convoy led by the cruiser Isuzu; the bombers damaged the cruiser, and it was subsequently sunk by Allied submarines. The same month, NWA's Liberators attacked targets in Java in the lead-up to the Battle of Tarakan that commenced on 1 May. By July, Charlesworth's command had been denuded of much of its strength as two of its bomber wings were transferred to First Tactical Air Force.

== Postwar career ==
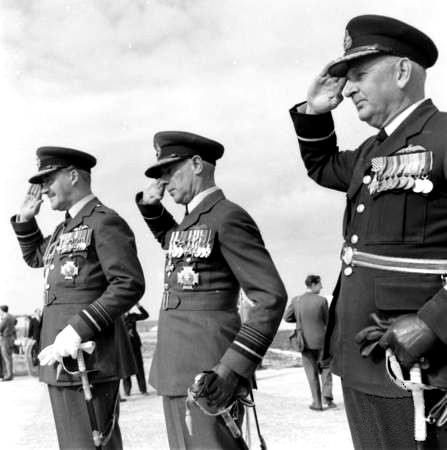
Charlesworth (right) as Officer Commanding RAAF Overseas Headquarters, with Air Marshals Sir Claude Pelly (centre) and Sir Donald Hardman (left) at a farewell parade for No. 78 (Fighter) Wing following garrison duty in Malta, December 1954

Among a small coterie of wartime RAAF commanders considered suitable for further senior roles, Charlesworth retained his rank of air commodore following the cessation of hostilities. He was appointed a Commander of the Order of the British Empire (CBE) in the 1946 King's Birthday Honours for his "conspicuous service in operations against the Japanese" while leading North-Western Area Command. The same year, he relinquished command of North-Western Area and briefly took charge of Eastern Area Command. He was then posted to Britain to undertake a course at the RAF School of Air Support. Returning to Australia, he became the inaugural commandant of the School of Land/Air Warfare at Laverton in April 1947. The school transferred to RAAF Station Williamtown, New South Wales, the following year. Charlesworth took overall command of Williamtown in 1949. In June that year, he succeeded fellow Duntroon graduate Air Commodore John McCauley as Chief of Staff, British Commonwealth Occupation Force (BCOF), in Japan.

Charlesworth's workload at BCOF increased considerably with the outbreak of the Korean War in June 1950 and the need to supply the RAAF's contribution to the conflict, chiefly No. 77 Squadron. In October, following the death in combat of Wing Commander Lou Spence, Charlesworth temporarily transferred from Tokyo to Iwakuni so that he could administer No. 77 Squadron and its ancillaries until No. 91 (Composite) Wing was formed to take over the task. Upon his return to Australia in June 1951, he was promoted to acting air vice marshal and appointed AOC Southern Area, headquartered in Albert Park, Melbourne. Towards the end of his tenure, the RAAF's wartime area command system was transformed into a structure based on function rather than geography. As a result, Southern Area was re-formed as Training Command in October 1953. In 1954 he returned to the UK to command RAAF Overseas Headquarters, London.

== Later life ==
Completing his term in London, Charlesworth retired from the Air Force on 31 December 1955, and was made an honorary air vice marshal the following year. He was then appointed a technical advisor to the committee organising the 1956 Summer Olympics in Melbourne. In 1958–59, he served as Director of Recruiting Combined Services, and later became a judge's associate with the Supreme Court of Victoria. In retirement he made his home in Glen Iris, Victoria, where he died on 21 September 1978. Survived by his wife and daughter, he was accorded an Air Force funeral and cremated.
