= RAAF School of Land/Air Warfare =

- Active: 1947–1975
- Country: Australia
- Branch: Royal Australian Air Force
- Garrison/HQ: RAAF Base Williamtown
- Motto(s): Unity of Purpose

Commanders
- Notable commandants: Alan Charlesworth (1947–49); Bill Garing (1949–51); Brian Eaton (1957–58)

The School of Land/Air Warfare was a Royal Australian Air Force (RAAF) joint warfare school. Established as the School of Air Support in January 1947 at RAAF Station Laverton, Victoria, it was renamed the School of Land/Air Warfare in March 1948, and moved to RAAF Station Williamtown, New South Wales, later that year. Its motto was "Unity of Purpose". The school was disbanded and re-formed as the Air Support Unit in August 1958. The Air Support Unit was disbanded in August 1975.

The school had its origins in a wartime training unit, the RAAF School of Army Cooperation, formed at RAAF Station Canberra in 1941. Its policy was informed by the Joint Air/Land (later Land/Air) Warfare Committee formed in 1947. The School of Land/Air Warfare was commanded by an Air Force officer but staffed by officers from all three services. Courses included air support, forward air control, ground liaison, joint exercise planning, and parachuting. The student body was generally divided roughly equally between Air Force and Army members. In 1966, several years after the school was re-formed as the Air Support Unit, naval cooperation courses were added to the syllabus.
