= Malala (disambiguation) =

Malala primarily refers to Malala Yousafzai, a Pakistani girls' education activist and 2014 Nobel Peace Prize winner.

Malala may also refer to:

- 316201 Malala, an asteroid named in honour of Malala Yousafzai
- Malala (village), a village in India
- Malalai of Maiwand, a female national folk hero of Afghanistan, also known as Malala
- Mala language, a Papuan language, also known as Malala language
- Mallala, South Australia, a city in Australia
