= Leon Lachal =

Leon Victor Lachal
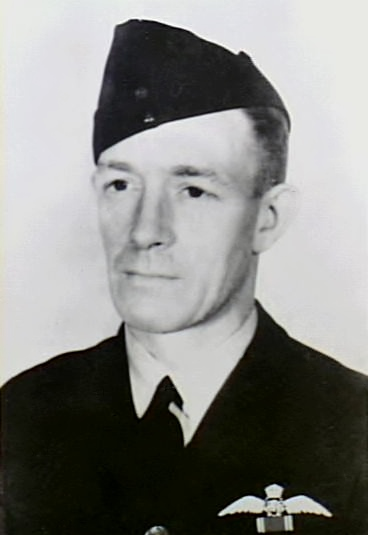
- Wing Commander Lachal in February 1940
- Born: 18 May 1904; Abbotsford, Victoria
- Died: 12 March 1983 (aged 78); Melbourne, Victoria
- Military career
- Allegiance: Australia
- Branch: Royal Australian Air Force
- Service years: 1926–47
- Rank: Air Commodore
- Commands: Eastern Area Command (1945, 1946–47); No. 5 Service Flying Training School (1942); No. 3 Service Flying Training School (1941–42); No. 10 Squadron (1939–40)
- Conflicts: Second World War
- Awards: Commander of the Order of the British Empire

Air Commodore Leon Victor Lachal, CBE (18 May 1904 – 12 March 1983) was a senior commander in the Royal Australian Air Force (RAAF). He served from 1926 until 1947, reaching the rank of Air Commodore.

== Life and career ==
Leon Victor Lachal was born on 18 May 1904, in Abbotsford, Victoria, Australia.

He commanded several RAAF units throughout his career, including the No. 10 Squadron from 1939, the No. 3 Service Flying Training School from 1941, and the No. 5 Service Flying Training School in 1942. He also led the Eastern Area Command in 1945 and from 1946 to 1947. His service was recognised with the Commander of the Order of the British Empire (CBE) award.

Lachal died on 12 March 1983 in Melbourne at the age of 78.

Military offices
Preceded by Air Commodore Frank Lukis	Air Officer Commanding Eastern Area; 1946–1947	Succeeded by Air Vice Marshal Frank Bladin
