= Gumbowie railway station =

Former railway station in South Australia, Australia

Gumbowie

General information
- Coordinates: 33.061095602245416°S 138.8788356913284°E
- Elevation: 602.2
- Operator: Australian National
- Line: Roseworthy-Peterborough line
- Distance: 237 kilometres from Adelaide
- Platforms: 1
- Tracks: 1

Construction
- Structure type: Ground

Other information
- Status: Closed and demolished

History
- Opened: 11 May 1881
- Closed: December 1986
Location

Gumbowie railway station was located on the Roseworthy-Peterborough railway line. It was located between Terowie and Peterborough railway stations.

== History ==
Gumbowie station opened on 11 May 1881 when the railway line was extended from Terowie to Peterborough as narrow gauge. Gumbowie was originally established as a railway siding and was named after a pastoral station of the same name that existed from 1852. It was also the second highest railway station in South Australia at an elevation of 602.2 metres above sea level. A station building was constructed sometime after.

The line through Gumbowie was converted to broad gauge in 1970. In March 1978, the line and station were included in the transfer of the South Australian Railways to Australian National. Regular passenger services ceased in December 1986. The last passenger train to use the line was a Steamrail Victoria tour using Victorian locomotive R761. The line through Gumbowie was taken up in 1992/93; there is no longer any trace of the station or rails.
