= Malala, Diu =

Coordinates: 20°42′N 70°56′E

Malala is a village in the Diu district and Union Territory of Daman and Diu, India.
