= No. 73 Squadron RAAF =

Royal Australian Air Force squadron

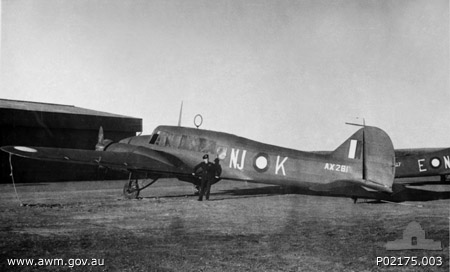
- A No. 73 Squadron Anson at Nowra in 1944
- Active: 1942–1944
- Country: Australia
- Branch: Royal Australian Air Force
- Role: Maritime patrol
- Engagements: World War II

Insignia
- Squadron code: NJ

Aircraft flown
- Patrol: Anson

No. 73 Squadron was a Royal Australian Air Force (RAAF) maritime patrol squadron of World War II. It was formed in July 1942 and conducted patrols off the east coast of Australia until July 1944. The squadron was disbanded in September 1944.

== History ==
No. 73 Squadron was formed at Cootamundra, New South Wales, on 1 July 1942 from personnel loaned by No. 1 Air Observers School. The squadron's formation was part of the RAAF's response to Japanese submarine attacks on shipping off Australia during mid-1942, and it was equipped with Avro Anson training aircraft. It was recognised that the Ansons lacked sufficient range and payload to be effective in the anti-submarine role, but superior aircraft were not available. The squadron conducted training in the Cootamundra and Wagga Wagga areas during July and early August.

The squadron moved to RAAF Base Nowra in September and began flying operational patrols. It was allocated twelve Ansons in October, split equally between its two flights. 'A' Flight's six aircraft were based at Nowra and 'B' Flight was stationed at RAAF Base Richmond. 'B' Flight moved to Camden on 2 November 1942 and a 'C' Flight with four Ansons was briefly formed at Coffs Harbour, New South Wales, from 10 July to 11 August 1943. The personnel loaned from No. 1 Air Observers School were replaced in January 1943.

No. 73 Squadron conducted anti-submarine and convoy escort patrols off the Australian east coast for most of its existence. These were usually uneventful, and no submarines were sighted. Six aircraft were lost in flying accidents. The squadron's aircraft had their gun turrets removed and Air-to-Surface Vessel (ASV) radar installed during 1943, and by the end of January 1944 the squadron was operating 13 ASV Ansons.

In November 1943 the RAAF began to reduce its anti-submarine effort as no Japanese submarine attacks had been made in Australian waters since the middle of the year. The RAAF ceased flying anti-submarine escort patrols south of the 24th parallel from February 1944, easing No. 73 Squadron's workload. The squadron was notified on 24 July that it was to be disbanded as part of a further reduction in the RAAF's anti-submarine forces, and flying ceased that day. The unit was formally disbanded on 9 September 1944.
