= RAAF Base Glenbrook =

Royal Australian Air Force base in New South Wales, Australia

- Glenbrook, New South Wales in Australia

Site information
- Type: Military air base
- Operator: Royal Australian Air Force

Location
- Location in New South Wales
- Coordinates: 33°45′48″S 150°38′12″E
- Area: 28 hectares (69 acres)

Site history
- In use: 1948 – present

Garrison information
- Current commander: Group Captain Kaarin Kooij
- Garrison: Headquarters Air Command

Airfield information
- Identifiers: ICAO: YGNB
- Elevation: 195 metres (640 ft) AMSL
Helipads
Number	Length and surface
H7	13 metres (43 ft) Asphalt
- Sources: Australian AIP and aerodrome chart

RAAF Base Glenbrook (ICAO: YGNB) is a Royal Australian Air Force (RAAF) base located in Glenbrook, in the Lower Blue Mountains, approximately 60 kilometres (37 mi) west of the Sydney central business district in New South Wales, Australia.

The base serves as home to Headquarters Air Command of the RAAF. There is no airfield although it has a heliport, or helicopter landing site (HLS). Most administrative services are located on the nearby RAAF Base Richmond. Parts of the 28-hectare (69-acre) site are heritage-listed and comprise the Officers' Mess, once the Lapstone Hotel.

During World War Two, men stationed at the base co-ordinated the stockpiling of mustard gas in the disused Glenbrook railway tunnel.

In 2009 the Minister for Defence, John Faulkner, announced that the base would be closed for revovations in 2015, and its command operations transferred to RAAF Base Amberley.

In 2026, the Federal Government’s Defence Estate Audit recommended the sale of RAAF Base Glenbrook.

== Units ==
Unit	Full name	Force Element Group	Aircraft	Notes
HQAC	Headquarters Air Command	Air Command	—N/a	
323SQN	No 323 Squadron AAFC	Australian Air Force Cadets	—N/a	

== See also ==
- List of Royal Australian Air Force installations
- List of airports in New South Wales
