= No. 6 Service Flying Training School RAAF =

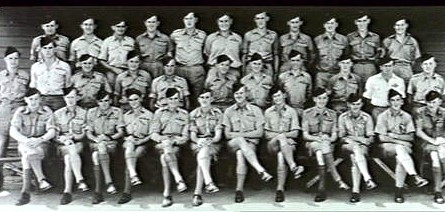
- Trainees of No. 6 Service Flying Training School, c. 1944
- Active: 1941–1946
- Allegiance: Australia
- Branch: Royal Australian Air Force
- Role: Intermediate/advanced flying training
- Part of: No. 1 Training Group
- Garrison/HQ: RAAF Station Mallala

No. 6 Service Flying Training School (No. 6 SFTS) was a flying training school of the Royal Australian Air Force (RAAF) during World War II. It was formed in August 1941, and commenced flying the following month. Responsible for intermediate and advanced instruction of pilots under the Empire Air Training Scheme (EATS), the school was based at RAAF Station Mallala, South Australia, and operated Avro Anson and Airspeed Oxford aircraft. The school formed a reserve squadron for Australia's defence after the outbreak of war in the Pacific in December 1941. Having graduated over 2,000 pilots, No. 6 SFTS completed its final training course in September 1945, and was re-formed as Care and Maintenance Unit Mallala in January 1946.

== History ==
RAAF aircrew training expanded dramatically following the outbreak of World War II, in response to Australia's participation in the Empire Air Training Scheme (EATS). The Air Force's pre-war flight training facility, No. 1 Flying Training School at RAAF Station Point Cook, Victoria, was supplanted in 1940–41 by twelve Elementary Flying Training Schools (EFTS), eight Service Flying Training Schools (SFTS), and Central Flying School (CFS). While CFS turned out new flight instructors, the EFTS provided basic training to prospective pilots who, if successful, would go on to an SFTS for further instruction that focussed on operational (or "service") flying. The course at SFTS typically consisted of two streams, intermediate and advanced, and included such techniques as instrument flying, night flying, advanced aerobatics, formation flying, dive bombing, and aerial gunnery. The total duration of training varied during the war as demand for aircrew rose and fell. Initially running for sixteen weeks, the course was cut to ten weeks (which included seventy-five hours flying time) in October 1940. A year later it was raised to twelve weeks (including 100 hours flying time), and again to sixteen weeks two months later. It continued to increase after this, peaking at twenty-eight weeks in June 1944.

No. 6 Service Flying Training School (No. 6 SFTS) was formed at RAAF Station Mallala, South Australia, on 25 August 1941, under the control of No. 1 Training Group. Its inaugural commanding officer was Wing Commander N. Brearley. The school was reported to have cost £233,000–240,000 to establish. Inclement weather kept the airfield out of action until 19 September, when the first nine Avro Ansons arrived. The initial course of flying training commenced four days later. Delays owing to rain, fog and high winds remained a constant hindrance throughout the school's existence. As well as Ansons, the school operated Airspeed Oxfords.

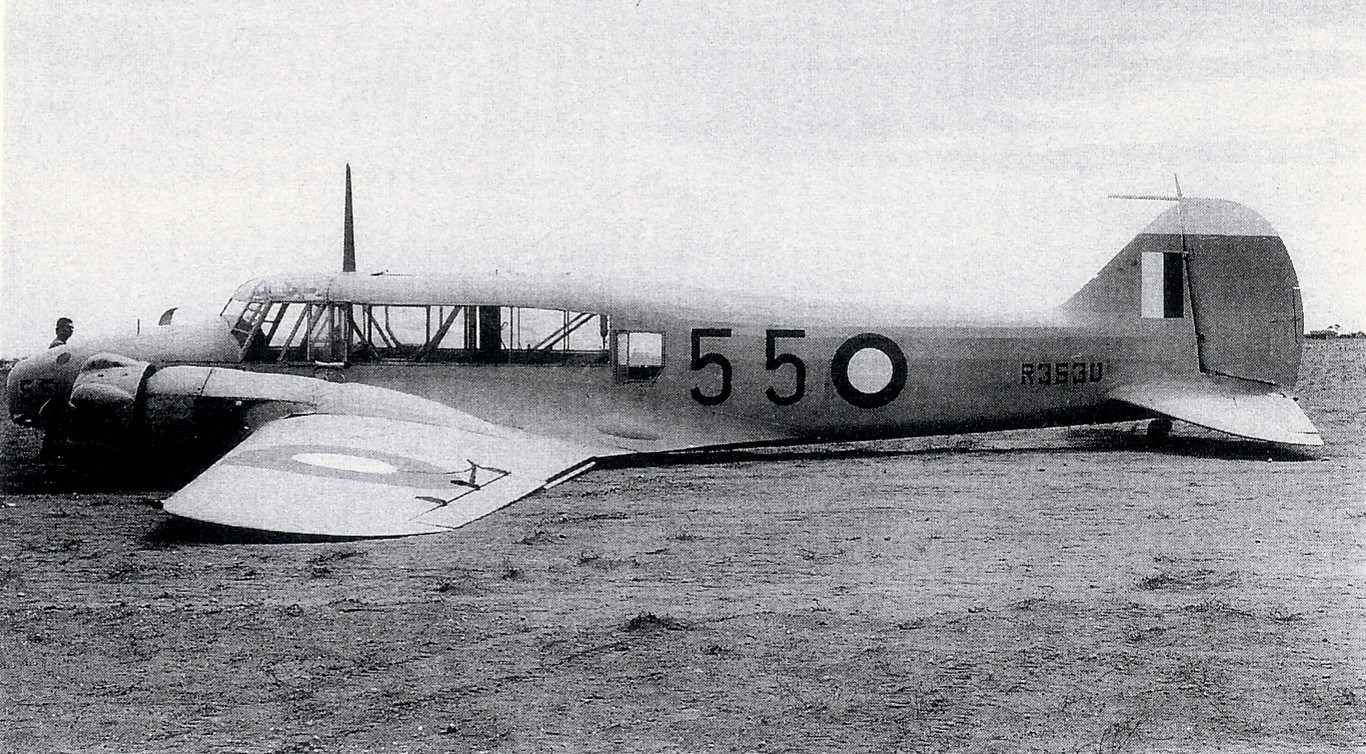
Anson of No. 6 Service Flying Training School after its undercarriage failed on landing at Mallala, February 1945

Thirty-nine fatalities were recorded during training flights, involving fourteen Ansons and two Oxfords. Two Ansons collided in mid-air on 14 October 1941, killing an instructor and student pilot in each plane. Another pair of Ansons collided on 13 February 1942, again killing both crew in each aircraft. Eight aircrew—four in each aircraft—died in a collision between two Ansons on 4 August. Five crewmen went missing during an extended test flight over the Gulf of St Vincent on 14 July 1943. All four crew members were killed when another Anson crashed on 23 September. The school suffered its last fatality on 28 November 1945, when a pilot crashed his Oxford while "shooting up" the school's recreation camp at Cape Parham.

Following the outbreak of the Pacific War in December 1941, the RAAF began classifying aircraft at SFTSs as Second Line (Reserve) elements in the defence of Australia. No. 70 (Reserve) Squadron was formed at No. 6 SFTS, and was tasked with army cooperation, meteorological survey, and photo reconnaissance duties in the Adelaide vicinity. The RAAF rationalised its EATS facilities in March 1942, dividing the personnel and equipment of No. 3 Service Flying Training School at RAAF Station Amberley, Queensland, between No. 6 SFTS and No. 1 Service Flying Training School at RAAF Station Point Cook, Victoria. The last course at No. 6 SFTS concluded in September 1945, by which time 2,178 pilots had graduated. The school disbanded on 1 January 1946, re-forming as Care and Maintenance Unit (CMU) Mallala. CMU Mallala was one of forty such units across Australia responsible for the storage of surplus aircraft awaiting sale, scrapping or stripping for spare parts. From June 1947, the base facilities constructed for No. 6 SFTS were occupied by RAAF units supporting the Long Range Weapons Project at Woomera Rocket Range.
