= RAAF Base Mallala =

- IATA: none; ICAO: none

Summary
- Location: Mallala, South Australia
- Built: 1941
- In use: 1941–1960
- Coordinates: 34°24′54″S 138°30′17″E
- Interactive map of RAAF Base Mallala

RAAF Base Mallala was a Royal Australian Air Force (RAAF) base at Mallala, South Australia.

== History ==
Since 1939, the RAAF was aware of a suitable airfield at Mallala. On 25 February 1941 a group of officers conducted a detailed assessment of the site. It was favoured for its flat geography, proximity to the Mallala township, proximity the main railway line running north of Adelaide, and reasonably low annual rainfall. There were some concerns about the potential for dust storms to disrupt flight but the use of a grass mat was thought to bind the surface enough to prevent dust.

By 1941, detailed plans had been drawn up. The plans included dozens of buildings and various facilities designed to house a large base staffed with around 1300 personnel. They included underground fuel tanks and 15 aircraft hangars. Construction of several elements of the base was completed by mid-August 1941.

The base was the home of No. 6 Service Flying Training School (No. 6 SFTS) during World War II. The SFTS provided advanced training for RAAF pilots, operating mainly Arvo Anson and Airspeed Oxford aircraft. Techniques taught at the school included instrument flying, night flying, advanced aerobatics, formation flying and aerial gunnery.

During 1942, war conditions saw some 4000 feet of trenches being dug around the site and anti-aircraft posts being built.

1943 saw the peak of activity at Mallala. During the year 711 trainees graduated. There were 120 Arvo Anson aircraft on site. Personnel exceeded 1600.

A total of 39 men were killed as a result of aircraft accidents serving with No. 6 SFTS at Mallala between 1941 and 1945.

Following the cessation of hostilities, RAAF Base Mallala was a temporary base for flight test and transport support for the joint UK-Australian Weapons Research Establishment at Woomera. When RAAF Base Edinburgh opened in 1954, operations at Mallala wound down until the base closed in May 1960.

The site has been extensively modified and is now the Mallala Motor Sport Park.

== Units based at RAAF Base Mallala ==
- No. 1 Airfield Defence Squadron
- No. 6 Service Flying Training School
- No. 24 (City of Adelaide) Squadron
- No. 34 Communications Squadron

== See also ==
- Mallala (disambiguation)
