= Ian Dougald McLachlan =

Royal Australian Air Force senior commander

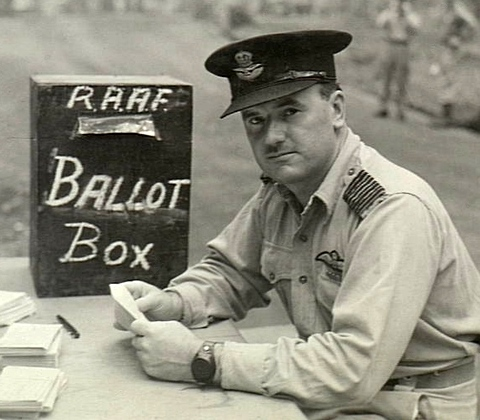
- Group Captain Ian McLachlan as Officer Commanding No. 73 Wing at Goodenough Island, New Guinea, preparing to vote in the Australian federal election, c. August 1943
- Born: 23 July 1911; Melbourne
- Died: 14 July 1991 (aged 79); Sydney
- Military career
- Allegiance: Australia
- Service/branch: Royal Australian Air Force
- Service years: 1930–68
- Rank: Air Vice-Marshal
- Units: No. 9 Operational Group (1943–44); BCAIR (1946–48)
- Commands: No. 3 Squadron (1939–41); RAAF Canberra (1942); RAAF Station Laverton (1942); No. 71 Wing (1943); No. 73 Wing (1943); Southern Area Command (1944–45); No. 81 Wing (1945); North-Eastern Area Command (1951–53); Training Command (1957–59); Supply & Equipment Branch (1964–68)
- Conflicts: World War II; Middle Eastern theatre; North African campaign; South West Pacific theatre; New Guinea campaign
- Awards: Companion of the Order of the Bath; Commander of the Order of the British Empire; Distinguished Flying Cross; Mentioned in Despatches
- Other work: Consultant, Northrop

Air Vice-Marshal Ian Dougald McLachlan, CB, CBE, DFC (23 July 1911 – 14 July 1991) was a senior commander in the Royal Australian Air Force (RAAF). Born in Melbourne, he was a cadet at the Royal Military College, Duntroon, before joining the Air Force in December 1930. After serving in instructional and general flying roles, he took command of No. 3 Squadron in December 1939, leading it into action in the Middle East less than a year later. Awarded the Distinguished Flying Cross, he returned to Australia in 1942 to command air bases in Canberra and Melbourne. The following year he was posted to the South West Pacific, where he led successively Nos. 71 and 73 Wings. Having been promoted to group captain, he took charge of Southern Area Command in 1944, and No. 81 Wing in the Dutch East Indies the following year.

Raised to acting air commodore in 1946, McLachlan served as senior air staff officer for the British Commonwealth Air Group in Japan until 1948. After leading North-Eastern Area Command in 1951–53, he was appointed a Commander of the Order of the British Empire and posted to Britain, where he attended the Imperial Defence College. Promoted air vice-marshal, he returned to Australia in 1957 as Air Officer Commanding Training Command; in this role he carried out two major reviews focussing on the RAAF's educational and command systems. He was Deputy Chief of the Air Staff from 1959 to 1961, and then Head of the Australian Joint Services Staff in Washington, D.C., until 1963. Appointed a Companion of the Order of the Bath in 1966, McLachlan's final post before retiring in 1968 was as Air Member for Supply and Equipment. He was a consultant to Northrop after leaving the RAAF, and lived in Darling Point, Sydney, until his death in 1991.

== Early career ==
The son of Dugald and Bertha McLachlan, Ian McLachlan was born in the Melbourne suburb of South Yarra, Victoria, on 23 July 1911. Following education at Melbourne High School, he entered the Royal Military College, Duntroon, in 1928. He was one of four cadets sponsored that year by the Royal Australian Air Force (RAAF), which did not at that stage have its own officer training college. Budgetary constraints imposed by the Great Depression necessitated the transfer of these cadets out of Duntroon midway through their four-year course. Although offered positions in the Australian Public Service or nominations for short-term commissions with the Royal Air Force, all were determined to serve with the RAAF, apparently "delighted" at the prospect of entering their chosen service early.

Enlisting in the Air Force on 10 December 1930, McLachlan completed his flight training the following year. He was commissioned as a pilot in 1932, and undertook flight-instruction and general duties roles over the next five years. In 1937, he was a member of the RAAF contingent posted to Britain to celebrate the coronation of King George VI. Ranked flight lieutenant, he was given command of No. 3 (Army Cooperation) Squadron, operating Hawker Demon fighters out of RAAF Station Richmond, New South Wales, on 4 December 1939. He was promoted to squadron leader on 1 February 1940, and led his unit to the Middle East on 15 July.

== Combat service ==
=== Middle East ===
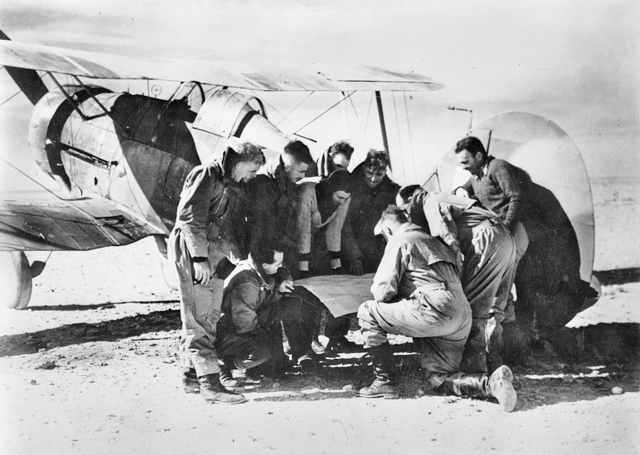
Squadron Leader McLachlan (second from right) confers with No. 3 Squadron pilots beside a Gloster Gladiator in Egypt, c. January 1941

Sailing via Bombay, India, No. 3 Squadron arrived at Suez, Egypt, in late August 1940. In its original army cooperation role supporting the Australian 6th Division in the North African Campaign, the squadron was equipped with obsolescent Gloster Gladiator biplane fighters and Westland Lysander observation aircraft. As part of his unit's work-up for operations, McLachlan organised training exercises with the 6th Division, as well as written exams to test his men's knowledge of army jargon and air-to-ground communications.

Described by historian Alan Stephens as "acerbic but capable", McLachlan led No. 3 Squadron through the Battle of Sidi Barrani in December 1940, followed by the Battle of Bardia and the capture of Tobruk in January 1941. Prior to converting to Hawker Hurricanes that month, the unit was credited with destroying twelve Italian aircraft for the loss of five Gladiators and two pilots; McLachlan shot down a Fiat CR.42 on 10 December 1940, the same action in which fellow squadron member and future ace Gordon Steege claimed his first "kill". Air Officer Commanding-in-Chief RAF Middle East, Air Marshal Sir Arthur Longmore, praised McLachlan and his squadron for their "high morale and adaptability to desert conditions".

McLachlan was awarded the Distinguished Flying Cross (DFC) for his "fine qualities as a fighter pilot" and "determined leadership" in the face of often "overwhelming numbers of enemy aircraft"; the citation was promulgated in the London Gazette on 11 February 1941 under the name "Ian Duncan MacLachlan". He was the first RAAF fighter pilot to be decorated in World War II. Promoted to wing commander, he took charge of the newly established RAF Benina, Benghazi, on 13 February, handing over No. 3 Squadron to Squadron Leader Peter Jeffrey. By May 1941, McLachlan was acting as RAAF Liaison Officer for the new Air Officer Commanding-in-Chief, RAF Middle East, Air Marshal Arthur Tedder. The Air Board in Melbourne, chaired by the Chief of the Air Staff, Air Chief Marshal Sir Charles Burnett, was not consulted over this change of role and took exception to the RAF's "unilateral action" in appointing McLachlan, but eventually acquiesced and permitted him to remain at the post to coordinate facilities for RAAF personnel in the region until July, when he was recalled to Australia.

=== South West Pacific ===
In 1942 McLachlan took command of RAAF Station Canberra, and, later in the year, RAAF Station Laverton, Victoria. Posted for action in New Guinea, he became the inaugural commander of No. 71 Wing at Milne Bay in February 1943. The wing consisted of No. 6 Squadron (flying Lockheed Hudsons), No. 75 Squadron (P-40 Kittyhawks), No. 77 Squadron (Kittyhawks), and No. 100 Squadron (Bristol Beauforts). It came under the control of No. 9 Operational Group, the RAAF's "premier fighting unit" in the South West Pacific Area (SWPA), whose purpose was to act as a mobile strike force in support of advancing Allied troops. In March the Beauforts took part in the Battle of the Bismarck Sea, "the decisive aerial engagement" in the SWPA according to General Douglas MacArthur, though they were unable to score any hits against Japanese ships.

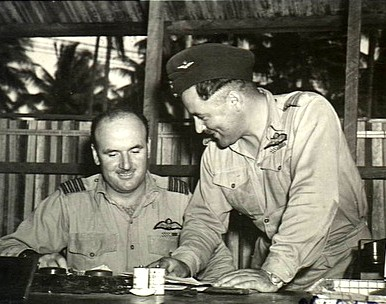
Group Captain McLachlan (left) with Group Captain Bill Garing at Port Moresby, New Guinea, c. 1943

By June 1943, McLachlan had been promoted group captain and given command of No. 73 Wing. He established his headquarters at Goodenough Island, where he was responsible for organising the wing into a fighter formation consisting of No. 76 Squadron (Kittyhawks), No. 77 Squadron (Kittyhawks) and No. 79 Squadron (Spitfires). As well as providing local air defence, and fighter escort for Australian bombers, the Kittyhawks were armed with incendiary and general-purpose bombs so that they could engage in ground attack missions, a practice that had already been employed by Commonwealth forces in the Middle Eastern theatre. In August, the wing transferred to Kiriwina, and No. 9 Group's other combat formation, No. 71 Wing, took over responsibility for Goodenough. Appointed senior air staff officer (SASO) at No. 9 Group, McLachlan handed over command of No. 73 Wing to Wing Commander Gordon Steege in October 1943. Towards the end of his posting to No. 9 Group, McLachlan told its former commander, Air Commodore Joe Hewitt, that the USAAF was "leaping ahead" of the RAAF, which was being left to "clean up the remnants" of Japanese resistance. He feared that Australian fighter pilots especially would be "increasingly restless if the Americans took all the fighting plums". Barely a year later, morale among senior RAAF fighter pilots had dropped to such an extent that eight of them tried to resign their commissions in the so-called "Morotai Mutiny".

In March 1944, McLachlan took charge of Southern Area Command, Melbourne, with responsibility for maritime patrol, convoy escort and anti-submarine warfare in southern Australian waters; he handed over to Group Captain Charles Eaton the following January. Mentioned in despatches on 9 March 1945 for his "gallant and distinguished service", McLachlan returned to action in the South-West Pacific as commander of No. 81 Wing, which comprised Nos. 76, 77 and 82 Squadrons, operating Kittyhawks. As part of the Australian First Tactical Air Force in the Dutch East Indies, the wing was slated to take part in Operation Oboe One, the Battle of Tarakan, in May but was unable to relocate from Noemfoor to its new base on Morotai in time. It fought in Operation Oboe Six, the invasion of Labuan, from June and was based on the island when the Pacific War ended in August 1945.

== Post-war career ==
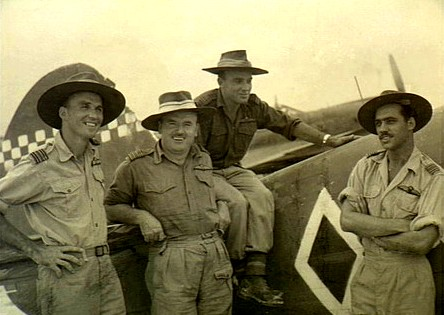
McLachlan (second from left) with pilots of No. 81 Wing at Labuan, North Borneo, in September 1945

Following the end of hostilities, McLachlan volunteered to serve with the Allied occupation forces in Japan. He married Margaret Helen Chrystal on 5 January 1946; they had a son and a daughter. Promoted to acting air commodore on 1 March, he was appointed SASO of the British Commonwealth Air Group (BCAIR), headquartered in Kure and responsible for No. 81 Wing RAAF, as well as squadrons from the Royal Air Force, Royal New Zealand Air Force, and Indian Air Force. Returning to Australia in 1948, he served as Air Commodore Operations at RAAF Headquarters, Melbourne, at which time the English Electric Canberra was ordered as Australia's first jet bomber, partly for its ability to deliver nuclear weapons. He completed his term in September 1951 and took over North-Eastern Area Command, based at Townsville, Queensland. Following his appointment as a Commander of the Order of the British Empire in the 1954 New Year's Honours, McLachlan was posted to Britain for three years, first attending the Imperial Defence College, London, and then serving as RAF Director of Flying Training at the Air Ministry during 1955–56. Raised to air vice-marshal, he returned to Australia in 1957 to become Air Officer Commanding (AOC) Training Command in Melbourne.

As AOC Training Command, McLachlan undertook two reviews that would have, according to the official history of the post-war RAAF, "a significant effect on the Air Force of the 1960s". In 1957, at the instigation of the Air Member for Personnel, Air Vice-Marshal Frederick Scherger, McLachlan formed a committee to review the effectiveness of the syllabus at RAAF College for meeting the future needs of the Air Force in an age of guided missiles and nuclear weaponry. This led to a policy of cadets undertaking academic degrees, in line with similar institutions in the other armed services; the college was subsequently renamed RAAF Academy. The official history of the RAAF considered the result to be only partially successful; although it turned out highly educated officers, they were educated solely in a rigid scientific discipline suited to an Air Force that never came into existence, one relying on missiles rather than manned aircraft. In 1959, McLachlan chaired a committee to review the change in the RAAF's command structure that had taken place in 1953–54, from a geographically based "area" system to a functional system consisting of Home, Maintenance Command, and Training Commands. Concluding that this had reduced duplication and improved efficiency, he proposed further rationalisation by amalgamating Training and Maintenance Commands to form a new organisation, Support Command. His plan was duly implemented, as was his recommendation that Home Command, responsible for air operations, be renamed Operational Command.

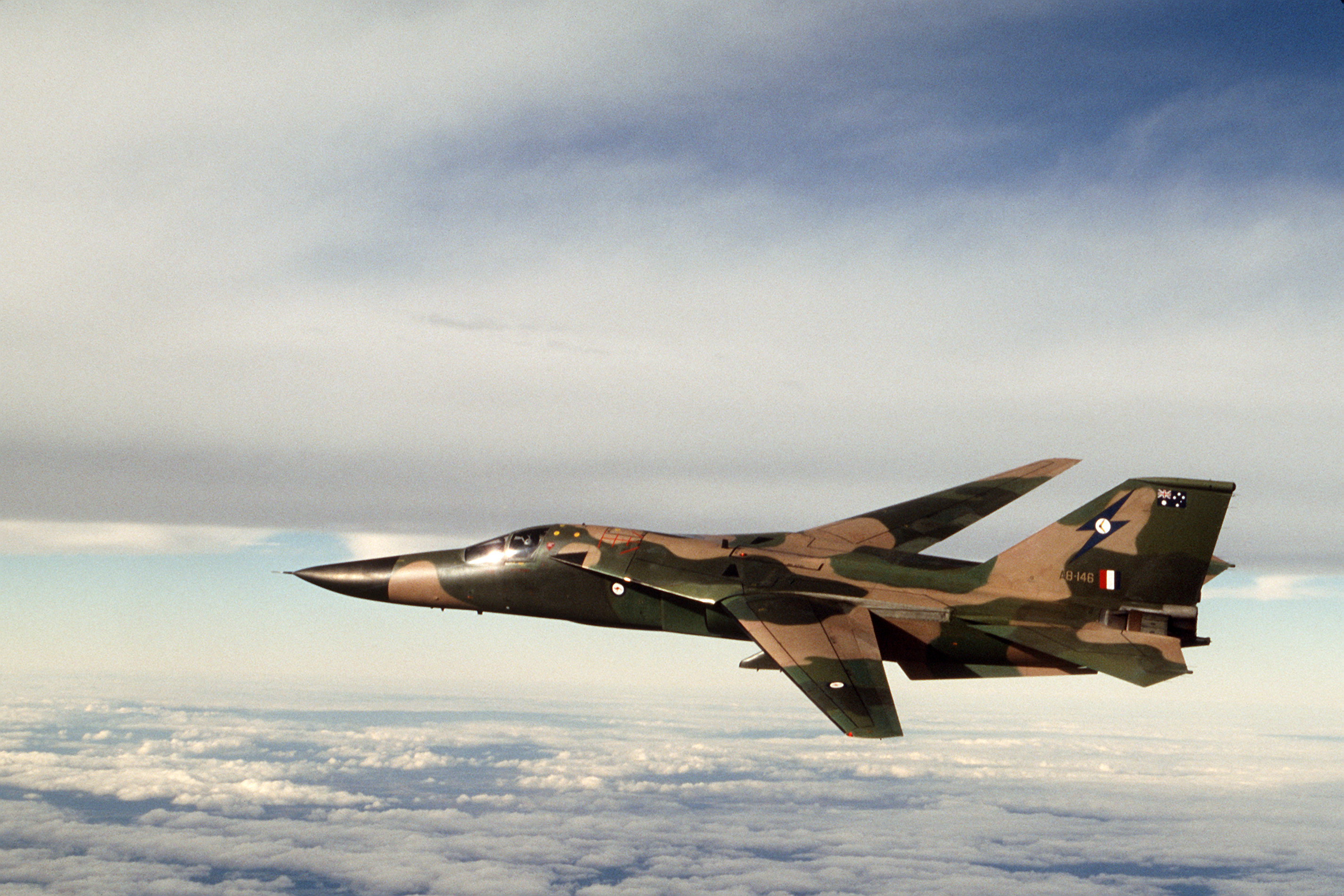
F-111C swing-wing bomber, twenty-four of which were ordered while Air Vice-Marshal McLachlan was attaché in Washington, DC. From the start he harboured doubts that the aircraft would be delivered on time and within budget.

McLachlan was appointed Deputy Chief of the Air Staff in 1959, before being posted to Washington, D.C., as attaché heading up the Australian Joint Services Staff in 1961. During his term in the US, Australia ordered the General Dynamics F-111C swing-wing bomber as a replacement for the Canberra. Despite what was touted as a firm timetable and cost schedule for the order, McLachlan confided to a colleague that he had serious concerns about when and if the RAAF would actually get the F-111, and what the final cost would be. According to Air Force historian Alan Stephens, "even for such a shrewd and sardonic man as McLachlan, that was to prove a painfully prescient observation", as the new bomber was delivered six years late and massively over budget. Following his return from Washington, McLachlan became Air Member for Supply and Equipment (AMSE) in February 1964. As AMSE he sat on the Air Board, the service's controlling body that consisted of its most senior officers, chaired by the Chief of the Air Staff. In this position he worked to increase the proportion of tertiary educated supply officers, following similar achievements among engineering officers in the RAAF's Technical Branch. He was appointed a Companion of the Order of the Bath in the 1966 New Year's Honours, the citation noting particularly his chairmanship of the two "historic" committees that reorganised RAAF College and the Air Force's command structure in the late 1950s. The use of electronic data processing became more widespread during McLachlan's tenure as AMSE, and by 1968 the RAAF's supply system had been computerised.

== Later life ==
McLachlan completed his term as Air Member for Supply and Equipment on 23 July 1968 and retired from the RAAF; he was divorced from his wife the same year. Upon leaving the military, he became an aeronautical consultant to the Northrop Corporation, and chairman of Information Electronics Pty Ltd from 1983, serving in both positions until 1987. He was also chairman of Pokolbin Winemakers from 1970 through 1975. In retirement he continued to exercise his interest in Australia's defence, joining in 1975 a group of pundits, including former Chief of the Air Staff Sir Alister Murdoch, who promoted the addition of nuclear weapons to the country's arsenal. A resident of Sydney's Darling Point, Ian McLachlan died on 14 July 1991.
