= North-Eastern Area Command =

Royal Australian Air Force command

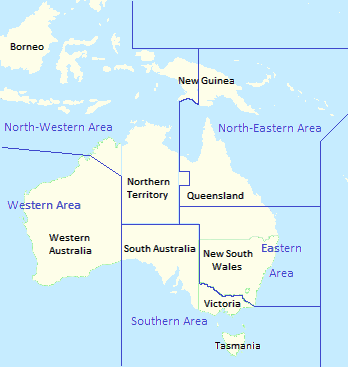
- RAAF area commands in November 1942
- Active: 1942–1956
- Allegiance: Australia
- Branch: Royal Australian Air Force
- Role: Air defence Aerial reconnaissance Protection of adjacent sea lanes
- Garrison/HQ: Townsville, Queensland
- Engagements: World War II

Commanders
- Notable commanders: Frank Lukis (1942); Harry Cobby (1942–1943); Ian McLachlan (1951–1953)

North-Eastern Area Command was one of several geographically based commands raised by the Royal Australian Air Force (RAAF) during World War II. For most of its existence it controlled units based in central and northern Queensland as well as Papua New Guinea. It was formed in January 1942 from the eastern part of the former Northern Area Command, which had covered all of northern Australia and Papua. Headquartered at Townsville, Queensland, North-Eastern Area Command's responsibilities included air defence, aerial reconnaissance and protection of the sea lanes within its territory. Its flying units, equipped with fighters, reconnaissance bombers, dive bombers and transports, took part in the battles of Rabaul, Port Moresby and Milne Bay in 1942, and the landings at Hollandia and Aitape in 1944.

The area command continued to operate after the war, but its assets and staffing were much reduced. Its responsibilities were subsumed in February 1954 by the RAAF's new functional commands: Home (operational), Training, and Maintenance Commands. The area headquarters was disbanded in December 1956 and re-formed as Headquarters RAAF Townsville.

== History ==
=== World War II ===
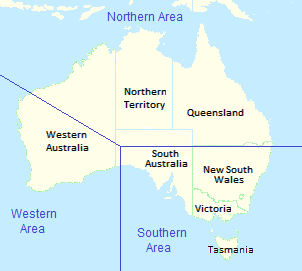
RAAF area commands in December 1941

The Royal Australian Air Force (RAAF) formed North-Eastern Area Command at Townsville, Queensland, on 15 January 1942, to take over the eastern portion of what was previously Northern Area Command. Northern Area had been established on 8 May 1941 as one of the RAAF's geographically based command-and-control zones, covering units in northern New South Wales, Queensland, the Northern Territory, and Papua. The roles of the area commands were air defence, protection of adjacent sea lanes, and aerial reconnaissance. Each was led by an Air Officer Commanding (AOC) responsible for the administration and operations of air bases and units within his boundary.

Northern Area was split into North-Western Area (NWA) and North-Eastern Area (NEA) following the outbreak of the Pacific War in December 1941, to counter distinct threats to Northern Australia and New Guinea, respectively. Air Commodore Frank Lukis, formerly in charge of Northern Area, was NEA's inaugural AOC, taking responsibility for RAAF operations against the Japanese in New Guinea, New Britain and surrounding islands. His headquarters staff numbered 248.

On 20 January 1942, over 100 Japanese aircraft attacked Rabaul, destroying or badly damaging six CAC Wirraways and killing or wounding eleven crewmen of No. 24 Squadron under Wing Commander John Lerew. The next day, NEA headquarters sent a signal to Lerew ordering him to keep his airfield open; Lerew, with only two Wirraways left, replied using a variant of the legendary ancient gladiatorial phrase to honour an emperor, "Morituri vos salutamus" ("We who are about to die salute you"). Ignoring a further message from headquarters to abandon his squadron and escape in a Lockheed Hudson bomber, Lerew began evacuating staff to Port Moresby, New Guinea, on 22 January.

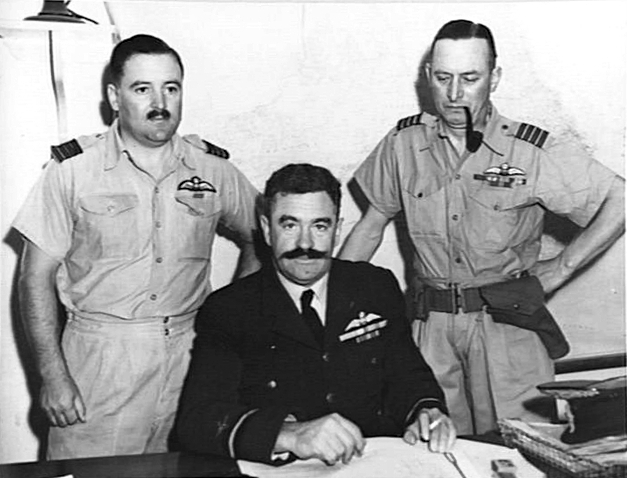
Air Commodore Lukis (centre), with Group Captain Garing (left), hands over North-Eastern Area Command to Group Captain Cobby in August 1942

No. 33 Squadron, operating ex-Qantas Short Empire flying boats and several smaller transports, was raised in NEA on 19 February 1942. Earlier that month, Lukis warned higher command of the poor state of preparedness and low morale of Australian Army troops at Port Moresby, due to lack of air cover and apparent lack of interest from government echelons. On 25 February, Nos. 3 and 4 Fighter Sector Headquarters were established at Townsville and Port Moresby, respectively, to coordinate fighter operations. Horn Island, in the Torres Strait, was raided by the Japanese on 14 March. Three days later, seventeen P-40 Kittyhawks of No. 75 Squadron, recently formed at Townsville, deployed to Port Moresby. Commanded by Squadron Leader John Jackson, the squadron suffered heavy losses in the ensuing battle. At one point NEA headquarters gave Jackson permission to withdraw but he refused, and the squadron was eventually credited with destroying thirty-five Japanese aircraft in the air and on the ground, securing Port Moresby until relieved by the 35th and 36th Squadrons of the United States Army Air Forces (USAAF), operating P-39 Airacobras.

Several USAAF bomber formations operated under NEA's control in early 1942, including A-24 Banshees of the 8th Bombardment Squadron out of Port Moresby, and B-17 Flying Fortresses of the 435th Bombardment Squadron (initially known as the "Kangaroo Squadron") out of Townsville. As of 20 April, operational authority over all RAAF combat infrastructure, including area commands, was invested in the newly established Allied Air Forces (AAF) Headquarters under South West Pacific Area Command (SWPA). One result of this was the integration of USAAF and RAAF staff at area headquarters. According to the official history of the RAAF, though "more a diplomatic gesture than a practical method of war organisation", it gave personnel from the two services the opportunity to quickly become acclimatised to each other and "in North-Eastern Area, as an example, the atmosphere was happy and the staff extremely cooperative". Following the Battle of the Coral Sea in May, USAAF units no longer operated under RAAF control in the NEA but were commanded directly by senior American officers of the AAF; overall responsibility for operational tasking in NEA transferred to the AAF at the end of July.

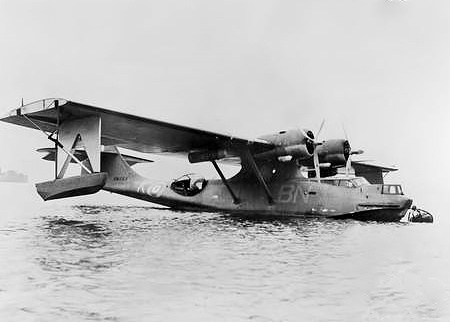
No. 11 Squadron Catalina at Port Moresby

NEA's operational headquarters, a reinforced concrete bunker known as Building 81, was completed in May 1942. Located on Green Street, Townsville, at the base of Castle Hill, it was topped with a suburban house to mislead enemy aircraft. The same month, Eastern Area Command was formed, taking control of units in New South Wales and southern Queensland from Southern Area and NEA. This left NEA in command of Nos. 24, 33 and 76 Squadrons, as well as No. 3 Fighter Sector Headquarters, at Townsville; No. 100 Squadron at Cairns; No. 32 Squadron at Horn Island; and Nos. 11, 20 and 75 Squadrons, as well as No. 4 Fighter Sector Headquarters, at Port Moresby. The Japanese raided Townsville four times between 25 and 31 July; most bombs fell in the sea or the hills causing only one casualty, an injured child. NEA's boundaries were fine-tuned on 19 August: a portion of Queensland within the Barkly Tableland and the Haslingden and Heywood districts was assigned to the control of North-Western Area. Lukis handed over command of NEA to Group Captain (later Air Commodore) Harry Cobby on 25 August. By the end of the month, the headquarters staff numbered 684. No. 75 Squadron, replenished after its defence of Port Moresby, and No. 76 Squadron, deployed north from Townsville and also flying Kittyhawks, played what senior Australian Army commanders described as the "decisive" role in the Battle of Milne Bay in New Guinea during August and September 1942. During the battle, Cobby exercised overall command of the RAAF units from NEA headquarters, while their efforts were coordinated on the ground by Group Captain Bill Garing, NEA's senior air staff officer.

On 1 September 1942, No. 9 (Operational) Group was formed at Port Moresby as a mobile strike force to move forward with Allied advances in the Pacific, in contrast to the static, defensive nature of the area commands. It took over all units in New Guinea previously operating under NEA Command. NEA initially retained administrative control of No. 9 Group but, on 1 January 1943, the group was made independent of the area command and its administration became the responsibility of RAAF Headquarters, Melbourne. September 1942 also saw the formation of RAAF Command, led by Air Vice Marshal Bill Bostock, to oversee the majority of Australian flying units in the SWPA. Bostock exercised control of air operations through the area commands, although RAAF Headquarters continued to hold administrative authority over all Australian units. He personally coordinated operations when they involved more than one area command, for instance when the fighter squadrons of both NWA and NEA were required to repulse a major attack. No. 42 (Radar) Wing was formed at Townsville in February 1943, and the following month took control of all radar stations in NEA. As of April 1943, the area command directly controlled four squadrons tasked primarily with anti-submarine warfare: No. 7 Squadron, flying Bristol Beaufort reconnaissance-bombers out of Ross River; No. 9 Squadron, a fleet co-operation unit flying Supermarine Seagulls from Bowen; and Nos. 11 and 20 Squadrons, flying reconnaissance and bombing missions with PBY Catalinas from Cairns.

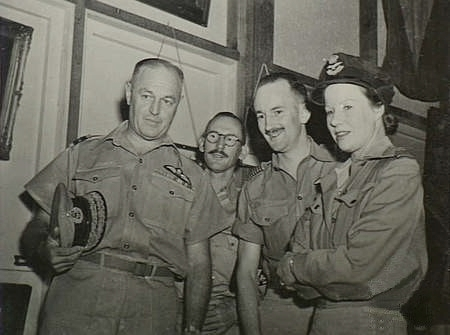
Air Commodore Summers (left), who succeeded Air Commodore Cobby as AOC North-Eastern Area Command, with staff in Townsville, May 1944

In early 1943, Japan was still believed to be capable of invading, or at least bombing, the Torres Strait islands, and NEA had only No. 7 Squadron, now operating from Horn Island, to counter the threat. It was reinforced in April by No. 84 Squadron, flying CAC Boomerang fighters. The same month, No. 72 Wing was formed at Townsville, before deploying to Merauke, New Guinea. Controlling No. 84 Squadron, No. 86 Squadron (flying Kittyhawks), and No. 12 Squadron (Vultee Vengeance dive bombers), the wing was responsible for Torres Strait's air defence, as well as offensive operations against infrastructure and shipping in Dutch New Guinea. In October, No. 84 Squadron converted to Kittyhawks and transferred to the newly formed No. 75 Wing, which was given responsibility for units at Horn Island, Thursday Island, and Higgins Field on Cape York Peninsula. In February 1944, No. 75 Wing headquarters moved from Horn Island to Higgins Field, where it was soon joined by other units under its control, Nos. 7 and 23 Squadrons; the latter operated Vengeances until being declared non-operational in June, before re-equipping with B-24 Liberators for duty in North-Western Area. By May, NEA's order of battle on the Australian mainland consisted of Nos. 7, 9, 13 (operating Lockheed Venturas from Cooktown), 20 and 23 Squadrons.

Cobby served as AOC NEA until November 1943, handing over to Air Commodore John Summers, who held command for the remainder of the war. By the end of November, NEA headquarters staff numbered 499, including ninety-seven officers. NEA's Catalinas joined aircraft of No. 9 Group in support of the US invasion of New Britain in December 1943 and January 1944. The Catalinas also conducted mine-laying operations around the Timor Sea in the lead-up to the landings at Hollandia and Aitape in April 1944. That month, No. 9 Group, which had become a static garrison force similar to the area commands on mainland Australia, was renamed Northern Command and given responsibility for RAAF units in New Guinea. In August, No. 75 Wing was disbanded and its units became the direct responsibility of NEA headquarters. The same month, No. 76 Wing headquarters, formed at Townsville in January and subsequently based at Cairns, was transferred to Darwin, Northern Territory. There it came under the control of NWA headquarters and oversaw operations by three Catalina squadrons, including No. 20. No. 42 Wing disbanded in October 1944, following a decision to assign control of RAAF radar stations to mobile fighter control units or similar formations. By the end of February 1945, NEA headquarters staff numbered 743, including 127 officers. No. 72 Wing headquarters transferred to Townsville in May that year, and disbanded a month later.

=== Post-war activity and disbandment ===
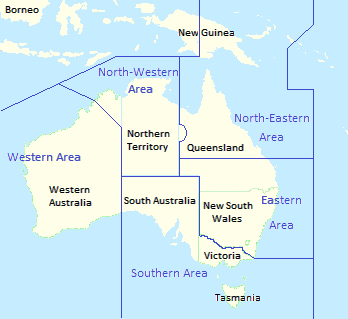
RAAF area command boundaries in 1947. The geographical command-and-control organisation was superseded by a functional system in 1953–1954.

On 2 September 1945, following the end of the Pacific War, South West Pacific Area was dissolved and the RAAF again assumed full control of all its operational elements. By the end of the month, NEA headquarters staff numbered 526, including ninety-eight officers. The Air Force shrank dramatically as personnel were demobilised and units disbanded; most of the RAAF's bases and aircraft employed in operations after the war were situated within Eastern Area's sphere of control in New South Wales and southern Queensland. NEA headquarters staff at the end of 1945 totalled 227, including sixty-three officers.

In September 1946, the Chief of the Air Staff, Air Vice Marshal George Jones, proposed reducing the five extant mainland area commands (North-Western, North-Eastern, Eastern, Southern, and Western Areas) to three: Northern Area, covering Queensland and the Northern Territory; Eastern Area, covering New South Wales; and Southern Area, covering Western Australia, South Australia, Victoria and Tasmania. The Australian Government rejected the plan and the wartime area command boundaries essentially remained in place. Northern Command (redesignated Northern Area in 1945) was dissolved in February 1947. By 1949, NEA headquarters was located in Sturt Street, Townsville. No. 10 Squadron was based at Townsville from March that year, operating Avro Lincolns over the Pacific and Australia's northern approaches in the maritime reconnaissance and search-and-rescue roles. Group Captain (later Air Commodore) Ian McLachlan was appointed AOC NEA in September 1951; he served two years in the post before handing over to acting Air Commodore Patrick Heffernan.

Commencing in October 1953, the RAAF was reorganised from a geographically based command-and-control system into one based on function. In February 1954, the newly constituted functional organisations—Home, Training, and Maintenance Commands—assumed control of all operations, training and maintenance from North-Eastern Area Command. NEA headquarters remained in existence but only, according to the Melbourne Argus, as one of Home Command's "remote control points". It was disbanded on 3 December 1956, and was succeeded by Headquarters RAAF Townsville (Headquarters Tactical Transport Group from June 1988, and Headquarters Operational Support Group from February 1991).

As of 2009, the former NEA operational headquarters in Building 81, Green Street, housed Townsville's State Emergency Service group.

== Order of battle ==
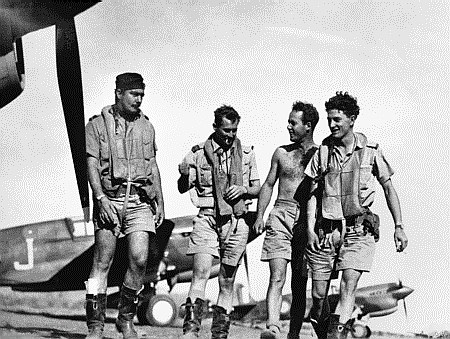
Flight Lieutenant Les Jackson (second left), brother of Squadron Leader John Jackson, with fellow pilots of No. 75 Squadron in Port Moresby, August 1942

As at 30 April 1942, NEA's order of battle comprised:

- RAAF Station Townsville
  - No. 24 (General Purpose) Squadron
  - No. 33 (Transport) Squadron
  - No. 76 (Fighter) Squadron
- RAAF Station Amberley
  - No. 23 (General Purpose) Squadron
- RAAF Station Port Moresby
  - No. 11 (General Reconnaissance) Squadron
  - No. 20 (General Reconnaissance) Squadron
  - No. 32 (General Reconnaissance) Squadron
  - No. 75 (Fighter) Squadron
- No. 3 Fighter Sector Headquarters, Townsville
- No. 4 Fighter Sector Headquarters, Port Moresby
