= No. 1 Training Group RAAF =

No. 1 (Training) Group RAAF
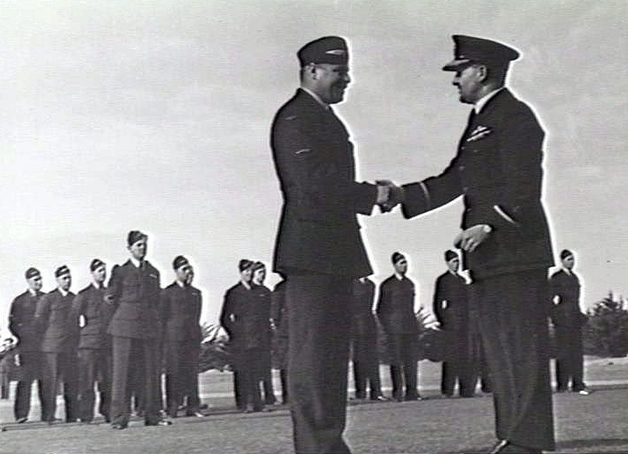
- Air Commodore Brownell, Air Officer Commanding No. 1 Training Group, congratulating an aircrew training graduate, August 1942
- Active: 1941–1946
- Country: Australia
- Branch: Royal Australian Air Force
- Headquarters: Melbourne

Commanders
- Notable commanders: Raymond Brownell

No. 1 (Training) Group RAAF was a Royal Australian Air Force (RAAF) group. It was formed in Melbourne in August 1941 as part of a reorganisation of the air force, and was disbanded after the war in January 1946.

== History ==
Prior to World War II, the Royal Australian Air Force was small enough for all its elements to be directly controlled by RAAF Headquarters in Melbourne. After war broke out in September 1939, the RAAF began to decentralise its command structure, commensurate with expected increases in manpower and units. Its initial move in this direction was to create Nos. 1 and 2 Groups to control units in Victoria and New South Wales, respectively. Then, between March 1940 and May 1941, the RAAF divided Australia and New Guinea into four geographically based command-and-control zones: Central Area, Southern Area, Western Area, and Northern Area. Each was led by an Air Officer Commanding (AOC) responsible for the administration and operations of all air bases and units within his boundary. No. 1 Group, which had been established on 20 November 1939, was re-formed as Southern Area Command on 7 March 1940. Headquartered in Melbourne, Southern Area controlled all Air Force units in Victoria, Tasmania, South Australia and the southern Riverina district of New South Wales.

By mid-1941, the RAAF's expanding instructional program necessitated the establishment of overarching training organisations on a semi-functional, semi-geographical basis. Accordingly, on 2 August, No. 1 (Training) Group was formed in Melbourne to assume responsibility for training units within Southern Area's boundaries. It was commanded by Air Commodore Raymond Brownell until 1 January 1943. Three other training groups were envisaged, but in the event only No. 2 in Sydney was formed. As of early 1943, both active training groups reported directly to RAAF Headquarters.

Following the end of the war, No. 1 (Training) Group was disbanded in Melbourne on 29 January 1946.
