= RAAF Command =

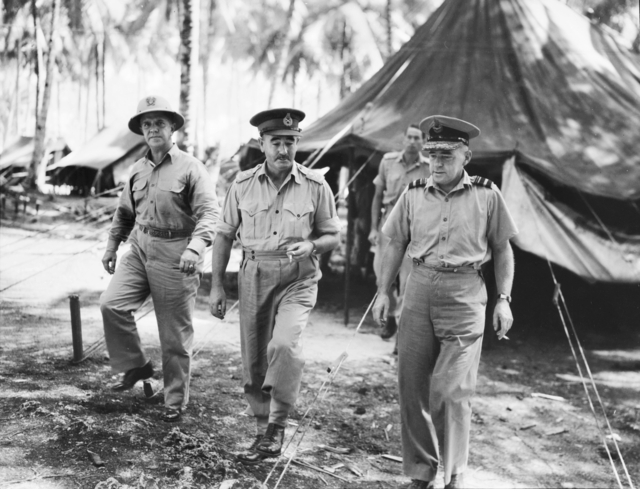
- Air Vice Marshal Bill Bostock (right) with Australian I Corps commander Lieutenant General Sir Leslie Morshead (centre) and US Rear Admiral Forrest B. Royal at Morotai, April 1945
- Active: 1942–45
- Country: Australia
- Branch: Royal Australian Air Force
- Role: Air defence Maritime patrol Offensive air operations
- Size: 41 squadrons (October 1944)
- Engagements: World War II

Commanders
- Air Officer Commanding: William Bostock

RAAF Command was the main operational arm of the Royal Australian Air Force (RAAF) during World War II. The command was formed in September 1942 and by April 1943 comprised 27 squadrons, including units from the Netherlands, the United Kingdom and the United States, as well as Australia. Coming under the operational authority of Allied Air Forces Headquarters in the South West Pacific Area, RAAF Command exercised control of its units through geographically based area commands in Australia and, later, New Guinea, as well as large mobile formations including the Australian First Tactical Air Force. The command reached a strength of 41 squadrons in October 1944. From the time of its establishment, until its disbandment in September 1945, it was led by Air Vice Marshal Bill Bostock.

== History ==
=== Establishment and control ===
Allied Air Forces (AAF) Headquarters was established under General Douglas Macarthur's South West Pacific Area (SWPA) command on 20 April 1942. All Royal Australian Air Force (RAAF) flying units in the theatre, except training squadrons, were assigned to the control of the AAF commander, Lieutenant General George Brett, along with all United States Army Air Forces (USAAF) and Royal Netherlands East Indies Army Air Force (NEI) units. The RAAF's operational headquarters, including all geographically based area commands, fighter sectors, and combat air bases, were also subordinate to AAF Headquarters. On 3 September 1942, the new AAF commander, Major General George Kenney, formed the bulk of his USAAF squadrons into the Fifth Air Force. He then formed the majority of RAAF units, as well as the 49th Fighter Group USAAF, into another organisation, initially known as Coastal Defence Command, with his chief of staff, Air Vice Marshal William (Bill) Bostock, as air officer commanding. The establishment of Coastal Defence Command was officially announced on 8 September 1942; the new formation was renamed RAAF Command three days later, as Bostock felt that the previous name did not do it justice. The only Australian air combat units in the SWPA not under RAAF Command were those based in New Guinea as No. 9 Operational Group RAAF, which was controlled by Fifth Air Force.

RAAF Command was charged with defending Australia, except in the north-east, protecting the sea lanes to New Guinea, and conducting operations against Japanese shipping, airfields and other installations in the Dutch East Indies. Its role was thus "mainly defensive" at the outset, with the expectation that "in the event of developments in the North and North-West of Australia, this would be altered". Bostock was to exercise control of air operations through the RAAF area command system, comprising North-Western, Western, Southern, Eastern, and North-Eastern Area Commands. While the arrangements effectively gave him operational command of the RAAF in the South West Pacific, administrative control of the units was retained by Air Force Headquarters, Melbourne, and the Chief of the Air Staff, Air Vice Marshal George Jones. Bostock was thus in the position of having to serve two masters, reporting to Kenney for tasking but to Jones for supplies and equipment. Despite the Australian Chiefs of Staff Committee recommending "unified operational and administrative control" of the Air Force, the division of command was permitted to continue, and was a source of "acute personal tension" between the RAAF's two most senior officers for the remainder of the war. Jones had opposed the creation of RAAF Command as a separate organisation to Air Force Headquarters, and only formally recognised it as an RAAF unit headquarters in March 1943, eight months after it had been established.

=== Operations and expansion ===
By April 1943, the disposition of the AAF was such that RAAF Command, headquartered in Brisbane, Queensland, controlled 27 squadrons: 24 Australian units plus one each from the Netherlands, the United Kingdom and the United States. Its main war-fighting effort was centred in North-Western Area Command, headquartered in Darwin, Northern Territory, while No. 9 Group conducted operations in New Guinea. RAAF Command units in the Western, Southern, Eastern, and North-Eastern Area Commands were engaged in maritime patrol, anti-submarine, and minelaying operations off the Australian coast. In June, the 380th Bombardment Group USAAF, operating B-24 Liberator heavy bombers, was also placed under the control of RAAF Command, which assigned the group to North-Western Area. By the end of 1943, No. 9 Group, originally the RAAF's mobile strike force, had become engaged in static garrison duties in New Guinea. No. 10 Operational Group was raised on 13 November 1943 at Nadzab to take over that mobile function. In February 1944, RAAF Command took over many of the units of No. 9 Group, as well as responsibility for the Port Moresby and Milne Bay sectors; South-Eastern New Guinea thus effectively became an extension of Australia for the purposes of RAAF Command's sphere of operations. No. 9 Group was subsequently renamed Northern Command, to better reflect its new function as a static area command covering New Guinea. No. 10 Group's initial combat missions were conducted from Cape Gloucester in March, before preparations began in April for the Hollandia–Aitape landings. These operations were supported by a bombing and mine-laying campaign directed by RAAF Command through North-Western Area. By October 1944, No. 10 Group's name had been changed to First Tactical Air Force (No. 1 TAF), and RAAF Command's complement had swelled to 41 Australian squadrons.

An RAAF Command forward headquarters, known as Advanced RAAF Command or ADRAAFCOM, was established on 15 March 1945 at Morotai to directly control No. 1 TAF during the upcoming Oboe operations, the reoccupation of Borneo. Responsibility for all Allied air operations south of the Philippines, as well as Royal New Zealand Air Force (RNZAF) units based in the Solomon Islands to support the Bougainville Campaign, was assigned to RAAF Command. Bostock expressed to Kenney his desire that "1st Tactical Air Force should continue to be employed as a forward offensive formation rather than in a garrison role". However, by April morale among No. 1 TAF fighter pilots, dissatisfied with the ground attack and 'mopping up' roles assigned to them, had deteriorated to such an extent that eight senior officers attempted to resign their commissions in an incident known as the "Morotai Mutiny". Kenney, Jones and Bostock all became involved in trying to defuse the situation, and the commander of No. 1 TAF, Air Commodore Harry Cobby, was sacked and replaced by Air Commodore Frederick Scherger as preparations for Operation Oboe One, the invasion of Tarakan, were under way. RAAF Command had control of the USAAF Fifth and Thirteenth Air Forces, as well as No. 1 TAF, during the Tarakan operation, which commenced on 1 May 1945. By this time RAAF Command comprised some 17,000 personnel. For Operation Oboe Six, the invasion of Labuan–Brunei in June, RAAF Command also had at its disposal aircraft based in Australia at Western and North-Western Area Commands. For Operation Oboe Two, the invasion of Balikpapan in July, Bostock marshalled forty Allied squadrons. His aim, in concert with that of Kenney and I Corps commander Lieutenant General Leslie Morshead, was to deliver the heaviest aerial bombardment possible against enemy targets, to enable Australian assault forces to land with minimal casualties. MacArthur called the Labuan air offensive "flawless".

With the end of the Pacific War in August 1945, SWPA was dissolved and Air Force Headquarters in Melbourne assumed full control of RAAF Command. The formation was disbanded on 2 September 1945, the same day that Bostock, along with Jones, represented the RAAF at the Japanese surrender aboard USS Missouri.
