= No. 71 Wing RAAF =

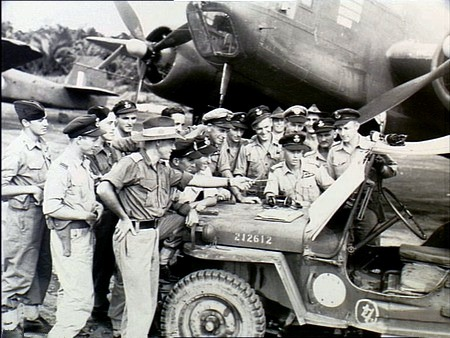
- Tactical reconnaissance crews of No. 71 Wing being briefed at Tadji Airstrip in New Guinea, June 1945
- Active: 1943–46
- Country: Australia
- Branch: Royal Australian Air Force
- Role: Attack
- Size: Four–five flying squadrons
- Part of: No. 9 Group (1943–44); No. 10 Group (1944); Northern Command (1944–45)
- Engagements: World War II: New Guinea campaign; Battle of the Bismarck Sea; Bombing of Rabaul; Western New Guinea campaign; Battle of Aitape; Aitape–Wewak campaign

Commanders
- Notable commanders: Ian McLachlan (1943); Blake Pelly (1943–44); Colin Hannah (1944); Val Hancock (1945)

Aircraft flown
- Attack: Beaufort; Beaufighter
- Fighter: P-40 Kittyhawk

No. 71 Wing was a Royal Australian Air Force (RAAF) wing of World War II. It was formed in February 1943 at Milne Bay, Papua New Guinea, as part of No. 9 Operational Group. The wing initially comprised two squadrons of P-40 Kittyhawks, one of Lockheed Hudsons, and one of Bristol Beauforts. The wing's mainstay soon became the Beaufort, which eventually equipped five squadrons attached to the formation. No. 71 Wing took part in the New Guinea campaign under the auspices of No. 9 Group, before transferring to No. 10 Operational Group for the Western New Guinea campaign during 1944. It then returned to the control of Northern Command (formerly No. 9 Group) to support Australian ground forces in the Aitape–Wewak campaign, and completed its final combat mission only hours before the Japanese surrender in August 1945. No. 71 Wing remained in New Guinea following the war and was disbanded in January 1946.

== History ==
=== New Guinea campaign ===
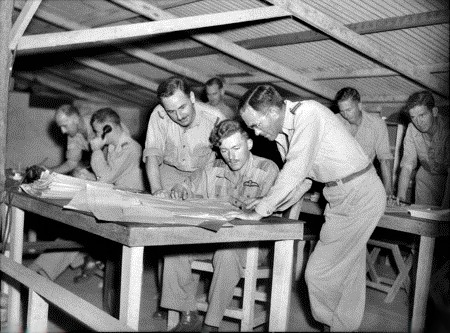
Fighter Sector Operations Room of No. 71 Wing on Goodenough Island, Papua, October 1943

No. 71 Wing was formed on 26 February 1943 to control four flying squadrons based at Milne Bay, Papua New Guinea: No. 6 Squadron, operating Lockheed Hudson bombers; No. 75 Squadron, operating P-40 Kittyhawk fighters; No. 77 Squadron, operating Kittyhawks; and No. 100 Squadron, operating Bristol Beaufort torpedo bombers. Its inaugural commanding officer was Wing Commander (later Group Captain) Ian McLachlan. The wing came under the aegis of No. 9 Operational Group, described by historian Alan Stephens as the RAAF's "premier fighting unit" in the South West Pacific Area (SWPA), whose purpose was to act as a mobile strike force in support of advancing Allied troops. In March the Beauforts took part in the Battle of the Bismarck Sea, "the decisive aerial engagement" in the SWPA according to General Douglas MacArthur, but was unable to score any hits against Japanese ships.

McLachlan relinquished command in June 1943 to become senior air staff officer at No. 9 Group headquarters; No. 71 Wing headquarters moved to Goodenough Island the same month. Between July and October, its squadrons carried out operations against enemy bases, shipping and lines of communication along the coast of New Britain. In August, the wing was given responsibility for Goodenough, where it was joined the following month by No. 8 Squadron, flying Beauforts. No. 6 Squadron had meanwhile converted to Beauforts from Hudsons; it remained at Milne Bay along with No. 100 Squadron, until both transferred to Goodenough in November. Between October 1943 and February 1944, the three Beaufort squadrons took part in a series of major attacks on Rabaul, bombing and strafing airfields, infrastructure and shipping; the Japanese withdrew their aircraft from Rabaul the following month. Wing Commander (later Group Captain) Blake Pelly held command of the wing from October 1943 until May 1944, apart from a period of leave in January–February 1944, when Wing Commander Colin Hannah, previously in charge of No. 6 Squadron, assumed temporary command.

=== Western New Guinea campaign ===
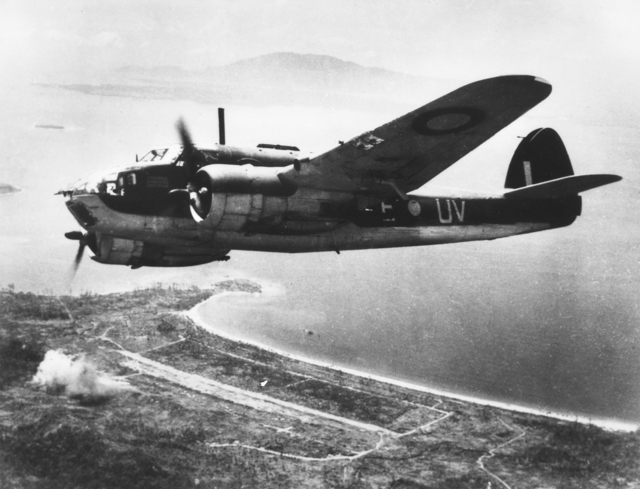
No. 8 Squadron Beaufort over New Guinea, 1944

By early 1944, No. 9 Operational Group had become a static garrison force for the New Guinea area, and was renamed Northern Command in April to better reflect its new role. The following month No. 71 Wing, now led by Wing Commander Ralph Moran, advanced to Nadzab, where it came under the control of No. 10 Operational Group (later the Australian First Tactical Air Force). There Nos. 8 and 100 Squadrons engaged in attacks on Japanese positions in Wewak, each flying over 140 sorties during the month.

In June, the wing went forward to Aitape, where its two Beaufort units were augmented by No. 30 Squadron flying Bristol Beaufighters, and the United States Army Air Forces' 110th Squadron flying P-39 Airacobras. These four squadrons undertook 1,510 sorties during the Battle of Aitape in July, delivering 670 tons of bombs. On 7 August, No. 8 Squadron flew 64 missions, a record for a Beaufort unit. US General Charles P. Hall praised the wing for contributing "in a large measure ... to the success of the operation by continuous interruption of enemy lines of communication and bombing and strafing of enemy concentrations and supplies". Commodore John Collins, who during the battle led a Royal Australian Navy task force that included the cruisers HMAS Australia and HMAS Shropshire, also paid tribute: "The accuracy of these bombardments was ensured by excellent air spotting. Beauforts of 71 Wing RAAF gave this spotting and deserve much credit for the efficient manner in which it was undertaken, particularly since the airmen were not trained spotters and a Beaufort is hardly a suitable plane for the work."

=== Aitape–Wewak campaign ===
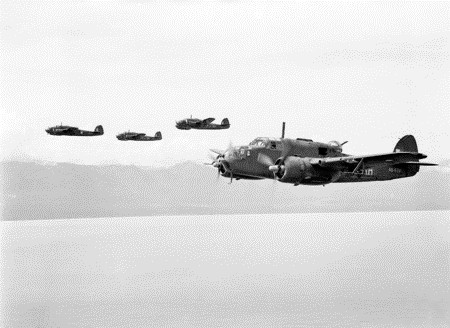
Beauforts of No. 100 Squadron near Wewak, January 1945

Following a decision in September 1944 that No. 71 Wing would not advance to Morotai with No. 10 Operational Group, but instead support the Australian 6th Division in the Aitape–Wewak campaign, overall control of the wing returned to Northern Command. The same month, the first Beauforts of No. 7 Squadron arrived in Aitape to augment Nos. 8 and 100 Squadrons; the wing was further strengthened in November with a flight of CAC Boomerangs from No. 4 (Army Cooperation) Squadron. Wing Commander Eric Cooper, previously in charge of No. 7 Squadron, became No. 71 Wing's new commanding officer in October. The Beaufort units flew around 500 sorties per month from November 1944 to January 1945, but thereafter had to reduce their rate of effort owing to aircrew, ordnance and fuel shortages. During a three-day period in March, two Beauforts blew up in mid-air while releasing their bombs; the aircraft were pulled from strike missions for ten days until the problem was traced to a faulty tail unit in the 100-pound (45 kg) bombs.

Cooper handed over to Group Captain Val Hancock, former commanding officer of No. 100 Squadron, in April 1945. To maximize support to Australian ground troops in the lead-up to the final assault on Wewak, No. 71 Wing's three extant Beaufort squadrons were joined by two more, Nos. 6 and 15. Approximately sixty Beauforts and Boomerangs struck Japanese positions behind Dove Bay prior to amphibious landings on 11 May to cut off retreating enemy troops. Over the entire month, the wing dropped more than 1,200 tons of bombs and flew in excess of 1,400 sorties. By mid-year, the wing was again acutely short of fuel and ordnance, so much so that the squadrons took to arming their Beauforts with captured Japanese bombs. On 9 July, enough supplies arrived to enable the wing to continue operating at nominal strength. No. 71 Wing was active to the last day of the Pacific War, flying its final combat mission involving thirty Beauforts only hours before news arrived of victory on 15 August 1945. Thereafter its squadrons dropped leaflets to remaining pockets of Japanese resistance, making them aware of the surrender. The last entry in No. 71 Wing's operations book was for 21 January 1946 at Tadji, New Guinea. The headquarters was disbanded six days later.

== Commanding officers ==
No. 71 Wing was commanded by the following officers:

From	Name
February 1943	Group Captain I.D. McLachlan
June 1943	Group Captain D.C. Candy
October 1943	Wing Commander B.R. Pelly
January 1944	Wing Commander C.T. Hannah (temp)
February 1944	Group Captain B.R. Pelly
May 1944	Wing Commander R.H. Moran
October 1944	Wing Commander E.W. Cooper
April 1945	Group Captain V.E. Hancock
September 1945	Group Captain T. Primrose
October 1945	Wing Commander L.R. Trewren (temp)
