= No. 2 Training Group RAAF =

No. 2 (Training) Group RAAF
- Active: 1941–1946
- Country: Australia
- Branch: Royal Australian Air Force
- Headquarters: Sydney

Commanders
- Notable commanders: Frederick Scherger; Frank Lukis

No. 2 (Training) Group RAAF was a Royal Australian Air Force (RAAF) group. It was formed in Sydney in August 1941 as part of a reorganisation of the air force, and was disbanded after the war in March 1946.

== History ==
Prior to World War II, the Royal Australian Air Force was small enough for all its elements to be directly controlled by RAAF Headquarters in Melbourne. After war broke out in September 1939, the RAAF began to decentralise its command structure, commensurate with expected increases in manpower and units. Its initial move in this direction was to create Nos. 1 and 2 Groups to control units in Victoria and New South Wales, respectively. Then, between March 1940 and May 1941, the RAAF divided Australia and New Guinea into four geographically based command-and-control zones: Central Area, Southern Area, Western Area, and Northern Area. Each was led by an Air Officer Commanding (AOC) responsible for the administration and operations of all air bases and units within his boundary. No. 2 Group, which had been established on 20 November 1939, was re-formed as Central Area Command on 7 March 1940. Headquartered in Sydney, Central Area controlled all Air Force units in New South Wales except those in the southern Riverina and the north of the state.

By mid-1941, the RAAF's expanding instructional program necessitated the establishment of overarching training organisations on a semi-functional, semi-geographical basis. Accordingly, on 2 August, No. 2 (Training) Group was formed in Sydney to assume responsibility for training units then under Central Area Command, which was disbanded. Three other training groups were envisaged, but in the event only No. 1 in Melbourne was formed. No. 2 (Training) Group moved headquarters from Sydney to Wagga, New South Wales, on 22 May 1942. As of early 1943, both active training groups reported directly to RAAF Headquarters. Group Captain Frederick Scherger commanded No. 2 (Training) Group from July to November 1943. Air Commodore Frank Lukis took command in April 1945, and held the post for the remainder of the Pacific War.

Following the end of the war, No. 2 (Training) Group was disbanded at Wagga on 26 March 1946.
