= RAAF area commands =

Royal Australian Air Force command system

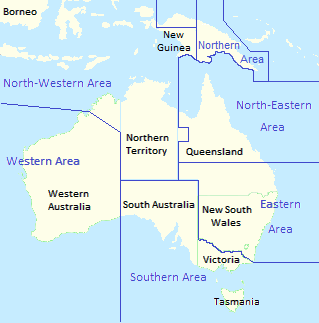
RAAF area command boundaries in 1944

Area commands were the major operational and administrative formations of the Royal Australian Air Force (RAAF) between 1940 and 1954. Established in response to the outbreak of World War II, they underpinned the Air Force's geographically based command-and-control system for the duration of the conflict and into the early years of the Cold War, until being superseded by a functional control system made up of Home, Training, and Maintenance Commands.

The area commands and their responsibilities evolved over time according to changing circumstances. The RAAF established four commands to begin with in 1940–41: Southern Area, Central Area, Western Area, and Northern Area. The commands oversaw most of the operations, training, and maintenance within their boundaries. A concession to functional control occurred in mid-1941, when the Air Force formed two groups that assumed the training role of the southern and eastern states; Central Area was disbanded and most of its units taken over by Northern and Southern Areas, and the newly formed No. 2 (Training) Group. The area structure was further revised in 1942, following the outbreak of the Pacific War; Northern Area was split into North-Eastern Area and North-Western Area, and a new command, Eastern Area, was created, making a total of five commands. The same year, the RAAF formed two functional groups that assumed the maintenance role of the area commands; the latter focused on operations until the end of hostilities. A new area command covering RAAF units in New Guinea, Northern Command, was formed in 1944 and dissolved soon after the war.

By the early 1950s, most operational units were based within Eastern Area Command, most Air Force training was controlled by Southern Area Command, and maintenance was the responsibility of Maintenance Group. The area command structure was no longer considered appropriate for delivering the concentration of force necessary for combat, and the Federal government decided to replace it with a functional command-and-control system. In 1953, Eastern Area Command was re-formed as Home Command (controlling operations), Southern Area Command was re-formed as Training Command, and Maintenance Group was re-designated Maintenance Command. The three remaining area commands ceded their authority to the functional commands in 1954, and were disbanded by the end of 1956.

== History ==
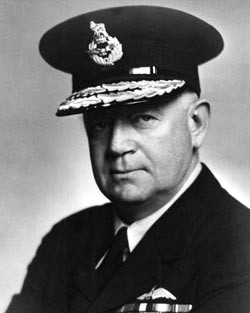
Air Vice-Marshal Goble, who proposed a functional command system for the RAAF in 1940

=== Origin and purpose ===
On the eve of World War II, the Royal Australian Air Force (RAAF) comprised twelve flying squadrons, two aircraft depots and a flying school, situated at five air bases: Point Cook and Laverton in Victoria; Richmond and Rathmines in New South Wales; and Pearce in Western Australia. An air force of this size did not require large-scale operational formations such as wings, groups, or commands, as all units could be directly administered and controlled by RAAF Headquarters in Melbourne. With the onset of war in September 1939, the Australian Air Board decided to implement a decentralised form of command and control, commensurate with an envisioned increase in manpower and units. The RAAF's initial move in this direction was to create Nos. 1 and 2 Groups in November 1939, the former based in Melbourne to control units in Victoria, and the latter in Sydney to control units in New South Wales.

In January 1940, the Chief of the Air Staff, Air Vice-Marshal Jimmy Goble, proposed organising the RAAF along functional lines with Home Defence, Training, and Maintenance Commands, but the Federal government did not take up this plan. Goble was replaced in February by a Royal Air Force (RAF) officer, Air Chief Marshal Sir Charles Burnett, who focused on rapid expansion of the RAAF to meet the needs of the Empire Air Training Scheme and believed that Australia's huge land mass would make a functional command system unwieldy. He proceeded to reorganise the Air Force into a geographically based "area" system. The roles of each area command were the same: air defence, protection of adjacent sea lanes, and aerial reconnaissance. Each area was led by an Air Officer Commanding (AOC) who was responsible for the administration and operations of all bases and units within his boundary. Exceptions to this policy included aircraft depots and the Central Flying School that trained flying instructors, as their range of responsibilities crossed area boundaries and therefore came under the direct control of RAAF Headquarters. The static area system was primarily defensive in nature, but considered well-suited to training new pilots, who could be instructed at flying schools and mentored through their initial squadron postings, all within the same geographical region.

=== Evolution and control ===
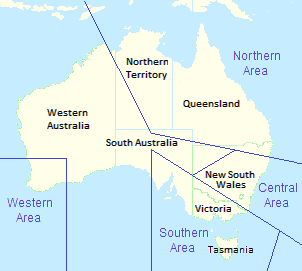
The four area commands as planned in February 1940

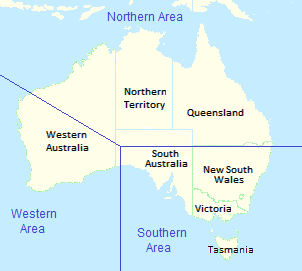
The three area commands as at December 1941

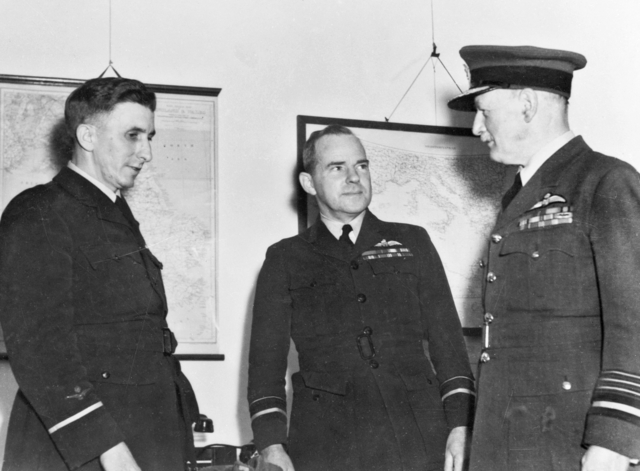
Air Chief Marshal Burnett (right), who instituted the RAAF's area command system in 1940–41, with Air Vice-Marshals Jones (left) and Bostock (centre), May 1942

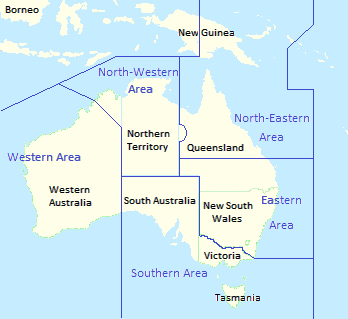
The area commands in 1947; these boundaries remained in place until the structure was superseded by a functional command system beginning in 1953

The RAAF planned four area commands initially: Southern Area, covering all units in Victoria, Tasmania, South Australia and the southern Riverina district of New South Wales; Central Area, covering units in New South Wales except southern Riverina and the north of the state; Western Area, covering units in Western Australia; and Northern Area, covering units in northern New South Wales, Queensland, Northern Territory and Papua. The first two commands established, in March 1940, were Southern Area, which essentially took over the role and headquarters of No. 1 Group in Melbourne, and Central Area, which evolved from No. 2 Group in Sydney. Western and Northern Areas eventually followed in January and May 1941, respectively; pending their formation, units in Queensland were temporarily controlled by Central Area Command, and those in Western Australia, Northern Territory and Papua came under the direct control of RAAF Headquarters.

By mid-1941, RAAF Headquarters had determined to form training units in the southern and eastern states into semi-geographical, semi-functional groups separate to the area commands. This led to the establishment in August of No. 1 (Training) Group in Melbourne, covering Victoria, Tasmania and South Australia, and No. 2 (Training) Group in Sydney, covering New South Wales and Queensland. Central Area was then disbanded and its responsibilities "divided as convenient", according to the official history of the war, between Southern Area, Northern Area, and No. 2 (Training) Group. Western Area retained responsibility for training, as well as operations and maintenance, within its boundaries.

With the outbreak of the Pacific War in December 1941, Northern Area was split the following month into North-Western and North-Eastern Areas, to counter distinct Japanese threats to Northern Australia and New Guinea, respectively. Southern Area was also considered appropriate for subdivision owing to its size, so Eastern Area was established in May 1942 to take over control of operational units in New South Wales and southern Queensland. These arrangements stabilised the number of area commands at five. Of necessity, the two northerly commands were primarily responsible for bombing and air defence, while the other commands focused on maritime patrol and anti-submarine warfare. Further convergence of command-and-control responsibilities along semi-geographical, semi-functional lines took place between June and September 1942, when authority over maintenance units was transferred from the area commands to the newly formed No. 4 (Maintenance) Group in Melbourne and No. 5 (Maintenance) Group in Sydney. Some fine-tuning of the area boundaries occurred in August: as well as the Northern Territory, North-Western Area was given responsibility for the portion of Western Australia north of a line drawn south-east from Yampi Sound to the Northern Territory border, and part of Queensland adjacent to the Barkly Tableland.

Until 1942, RAAF Headquarters exercised complete operational and administrative control over the area commands. In April that year, Allied Air Forces (AAF) Headquarters was established under General Douglas MacArthur's South West Pacific Area (SWPA), with operational authority over all RAAF combat infrastructure, including the area commands. In September the new AAF commander, Major General George Kenney, formed the majority of his US flying units into Fifth Air Force, and most of their Australian counterparts into RAAF Command, led by Air Vice-Marshal Bill Bostock. Bostock exercised control of Australian air operations through the area commands, although RAAF Headquarters continued to hold overarching administrative authority, meaning that Bostock and his area commanders were ultimately dependent for supplies and equipment on the Chief of the Air Staff, Air Vice-Marshal George Jones, who had taken over from Burnett in May 1942.

To help overcome the static nature of the area command system, in September 1942 the RAAF created a large mobile formation known as No. 9 (Operational) Group, a self-contained tactical air force that could keep pace with Allied advances north through New Guinea and towards Japan. By April 1944, No. 9 Group had become a garrison force in New Guinea and lost its mobile function to No. 10 (Operational) Group (later the Australian First Tactical Air Force). No. 9 Group was therefore re-formed as a dedicated area command covering air units in New Guinea; Bostock had recommended calling it Northern Area, before RAAF Headquarters settled on Northern Command. In August that year, RAAF Headquarters proposed disbanding the training and maintenance groups formed in 1941–42 and returning their functions to the control of the area commands, but no action was taken. The same month, the Air Board recommended carving a new Central Area Command out of Eastern Area, which it considered too large to be controlled by one headquarters. This proposed Central Area would have been responsible for units in southern Queensland but the War Cabinet deferred its decision, as it had when a similar concept was raised in October 1943.

Near the end of the war, No. 11 Group was formed on Morotai in the Dutch East Indies, using elements of Northern Command and the First Tactical Air Force; this freed the latter from garrison duties following the liberation of Borneo. In recommending the Morotai garrison's establishment, Bostock explained that although it shared the static characteristic of an area command, it differed in that the area commands were part of the permanent structure of the Air Force and situated within the borders of Australia's mainland and overseas territories, whereas the new formation was a temporary wartime measure, headquartered on foreign territory.

=== Post-war organisation and supersession ===
Following the end of the Pacific War in August 1945, SWPA was dissolved and the Air Board again assumed full control of all its operational formations. Nos. 1 and 2 (Training) Groups, and No. 5 (Maintenance) Group, were disbanded between January and March 1946. Northern Command, having been re-designated Northern Area in December 1945, was disbanded in February 1947. The other area commands continued to function with essentially the same boundaries as during the war, except that North-Western Area no longer covered the Dutch East Indies.

In the aftermath of the war, a geographically based command-and-control system was considered outmoded, and calls came to replace it with a system based on function. Bostock, who found the area boundaries "arbitrary", proposed a functional structure consisting of operational, maintenance, and training commands. With hindsight, the area commands were judged adequate for the organisation of the Air Force in the early years of World War II, but not for the rapid response times and concentration of force necessary to properly prepare for attacks on Australia following the start of the Pacific War, nor for conducting offensive operations from 1943 onwards. Air Marshal Jones, who had retained his position as Chief of the Air Staff (CAS) following the war, resisted pressure to replace the area structure. He was persuaded by his staff to set up a conference to discuss the possibility of change, but participation by the CAS, who had been satisfied with the wartime system, and the area commanders themselves, whose positions were on the line, was half-hearted at best. Jones did suggest reducing the number of area commands to three (Northern Area to cover Queensland and the Northern Territory, Eastern Area to cover New South Wales, and Southern Area to encompass Western Australia, South Australia, Victoria and Tasmania) as part of a much larger proposal to restructure the post-war RAAF, but this never eventuated.

The Federal government retired Jones in February 1952 and replaced him with an RAF officer, Air Marshal Donald Hardman, who was well versed in the functional command system employed in Britain. Hardman believed that restructuring the Air Force would remove inefficiencies and duplication, and permit commanders greater autonomy, allowing more effective concentration of strength in a potential combat situation. He declared that the RAAF was "the one force that could quickly strike for Australia's and the Commonwealth's defence in South East Asia". To this end he proposed reorganising command and control of the Air Force according to three major functions: operations, covering home defence and mobile task forces; training, including all permanent, reserve and national service recruitment and instruction; and maintenance, responsible for supply, equipment and other logistical services. The three functions were duly constituted in October 1953 as Home, Training, and Maintenance Commands, respectively.

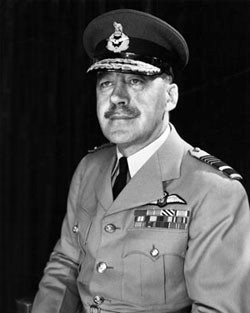
Air Marshal Hardman, who instituted the RAAF's functional command system

Home Command was formed from the existing Eastern Area Command, which was considered a de facto operational organisation owing to the preponderance of such forces within its boundaries. Training Command was formed from Southern Area Command, as it was already the hub of training services, controlling those in New South Wales and Queensland as well as Victoria and South Australia. Maintenance Command was formed from the extant Maintenance Group—as No. 4 (Maintenance) Group had been known since July 1947—headquartered in Melbourne. The transition to a functional system was completed in February 1954, when the three new commands assumed control of all operations, training and maintenance from Western, North-Western, and North-Eastern Area Commands. The headquarters of these three area commands remained in existence but only, according to the Melbourne Argus, as "remote control points" for Home Command. North-Western Area Command was disbanded in June 1955, Western Area Command in November 1956, and North-Eastern Area Command in December 1956.

=== Aftermath ===
The functional commands established in 1953–54 were revised in 1959. Home Command was renamed Operational Command, and Training and Maintenance Commands merged to become Support Command. Operational Command was renamed Air Command in 1987, and three years later Support Command split into Logistics Command and Training Command. In 1997, logistics management became the responsibility of Support Command (Air Force), the RAAF component of the Defence-wide Support Command Australia (later subsumed by the Defence Materiel Organisation). Training Command was re-formed as Air Force Training Group, a force element group under Air Command, in 2006. Air Command became the sole command-level organisation in the RAAF.

== Summary of area commands formed ==
The RAAF raised eight area commands over the course of World War II, and five of them continued to operate into the 1950s:

Command	Formation	Supersession/disbandment	Re-formed as
Southern Area Command	1940	1953	Training Command
Central Area Command	1940	1941	
Western Area Command	1941	1954/1956	
Northern Area Command	1941	1942	North-Eastern Area Command; North-Western Area Command
North-Eastern Area Command	1942	1954/1956	
North-Western Area Command	1942	1954/1955	
Eastern Area Command	1942	1953	Home Command
Northern Command	1944	1947	Northern Area (in 1945)

== RAAF organisation chart ==
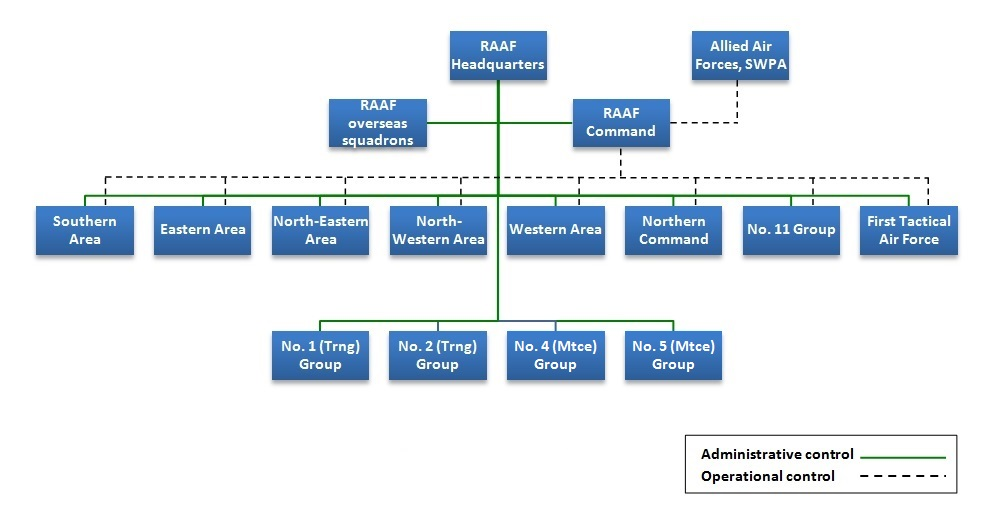
RAAF higher organisation as at August 1945

== See also ==
- RAF area commands
