= Frank Lukis =

Royal Australian Air Force senior commander (1896–1966)

Francis William Fellowes Lukis
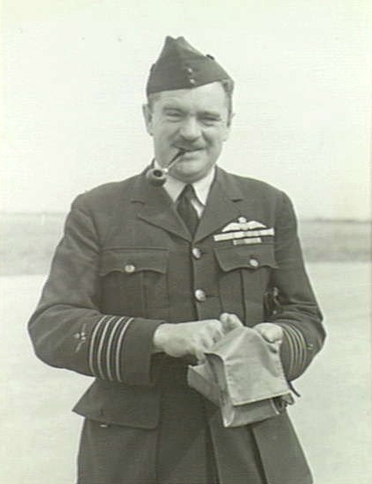
- Group Captain Frank Lukis during World War II
- Born: 27 July 1896; Balingup, Western Australia
- Died: 18 February 1966 (aged 69); Melbourne
- Military career
- Allegiance: Australia
- Branch: Royal Australian Air Force
- Service years: 1914–46
- Rank: Air Commodore
- Nickname: "Luke"
- Unit: No. 1 Squadron AFC (1917–18)
- Commands: No. 3 Squadron (1925–30); No. 1 Squadron (1930, 1932–34); No. 1 Aircraft Depot (1936–38); RAAF Station Laverton (1939–41); Northern Area Command (1941–42); North-Eastern Area Command (1942); No. 9 Operational Group (1943–44); Northern Command (1944–45); No. 2 Training Group (1945); Eastern Area Command (1945–46)
- Conflicts: World War I; Middle Eastern theatre; Sinai and Palestine campaign; World War II; South West Pacific theatre; New Britain campaign
- Awards: Commander of the Order of the British Empire; Mentioned in Despatches (2)
- Other work: Manager, ANA (1946–57)

Air Commodore Francis William Fellowes (Frank) Lukis, CBE (27 July 1896 – 18 February 1966) was a senior commander in the Royal Australian Air Force (RAAF). A veteran of World War I, he first saw combat as a soldier in the Australian Imperial Force at Gallipoli. In 1917, Lukis transferred to the Australian Flying Corps and flew with No. 1 Squadron in the Middle East, where he was twice mentioned in despatches. A member of the Australian Air Corps following the war, he transferred to the fledgling RAAF in 1921, and became the first commanding officer of the newly re-formed No. 3 Squadron at RAAF Station Richmond, New South Wales, in 1925.

Lukis went on to lead No. 1 Squadron in the early 1930s, and was promoted to group captain in 1938. Appointed an Officer of the Order of the British Empire the same year, he was in charge of RAAF Station Laverton, Victoria, during the early years of World War II. He later held forward commands in the South West Pacific theatre, including Northern Area (later North-Eastern Area), for which he was appointed a Commander of the Order of the British Empire, and No. 9 Operational Group (later Northern Command). Lukis also served on the Air Board, the RAAF's controlling body, as Air Member for Personnel. After retirement from the Air Force in 1946, he became a manager with Australian National Airways, and was active in veterans' associations. He died in 1966 at the age of sixty-nine.

== Early life and World War I ==
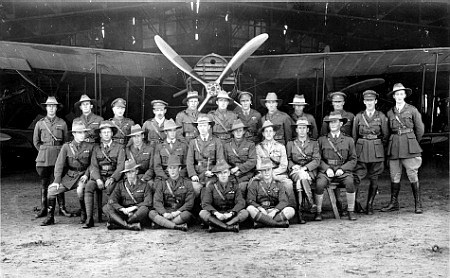
Lieutenant Lukis (middle row, fourth left) with officers of No. 1 Squadron of the Australian Flying Corps in front of a Bristol Fighter, Palestine, November 1918

Born on 27 July 1896 in Balingup, Western Australia, Frank Lukis was the son of grazier William Fellowes Lukis and his wife Jean. He was educated at The High School, Perth, and later worked on the family farm. In October 1914, he joined the Australian Imperial Force as part of the 10th Light Horse Regiment, the only such regiment raised in Western Australia. Ranked corporal, Lukis sailed from Fremantle aboard A47 Mashobra on 17 February 1915, seeing combat first at Gallipoli and then in Egypt. At Gallipoli, the 10th Light Horse went into action in the Battles of the Nek and Hill 60, before being withdrawn in December and redeployed to Egypt. There it took part in the campaign against the Turks in Sinai, including the Battle of Romani.

Lukis was commissioned as a second lieutenant in July 1916 and promoted to lieutenant in December. On 25 February 1917, he transferred to the Australian Flying Corps (AFC) and was posted to No. 1 Squadron (also known until 1918 as No. 67 Squadron, Royal Flying Corps), operating in Sinai and Palestine. He undertook reconnaissance missions as an observer in Royal Aircraft Factory B.E.2s from April to September 1917. In January 1918 he completed pilot training and began flying fighter and ground attack sorties in Bristol Fighters. He was twice mentioned in despatches for distinguished service with the AFC in the Middle East, the first gazetted on 16 January 1918, and the second on 12 January 1920. Lukis finished the war a flight commander with the temporary rank of captain, and returned to Australia on 5 March 1919.

== Between the wars ==
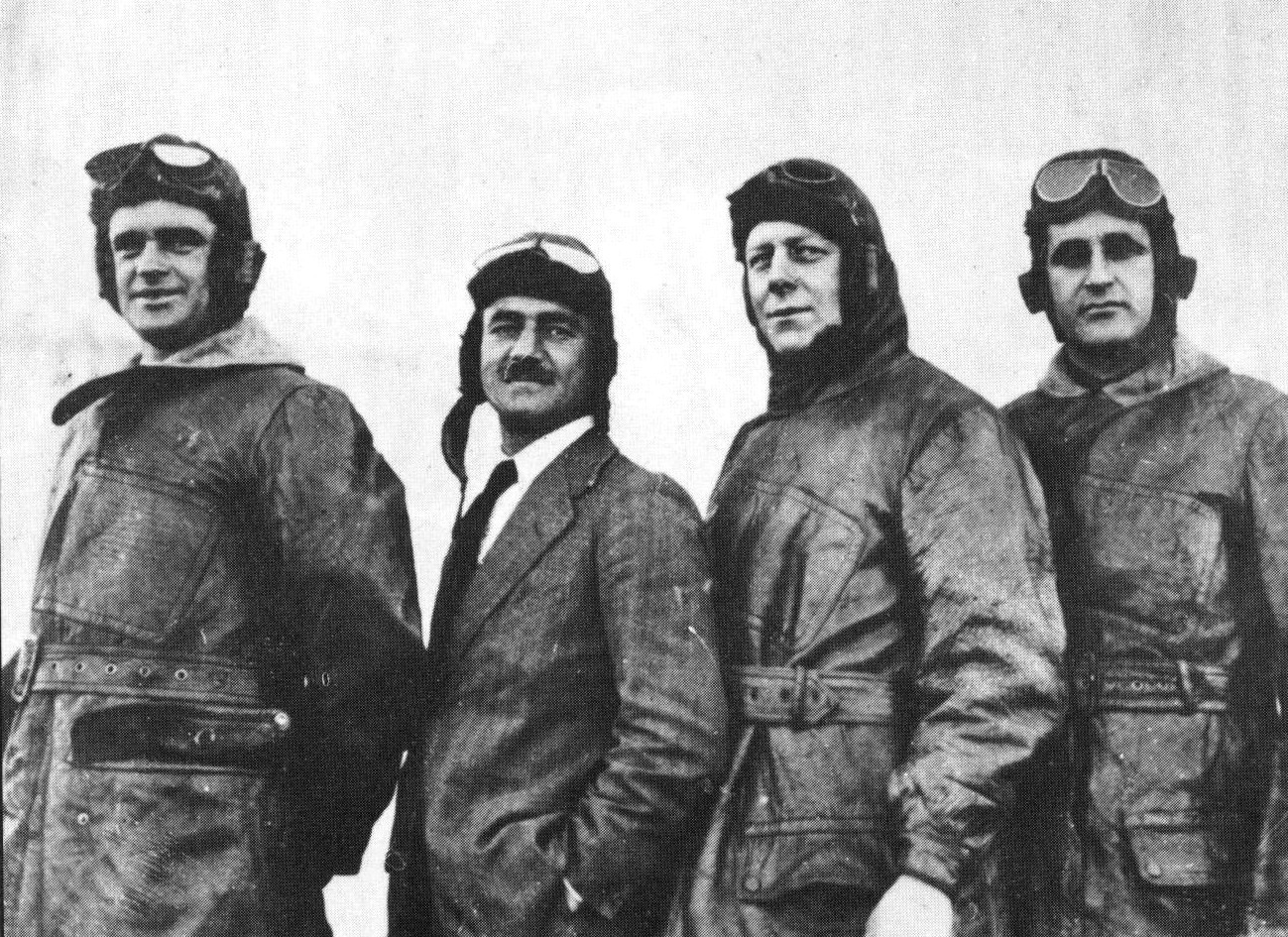
Flight Lieutenant Lukis (far left) and members of No. 3 Squadron, RAAF Richmond, 1925

With the disbandment of the wartime AFC, Lukis joined the short-lived Australian Air Corps early in 1920. He transferred to the newly formed Royal Australian Air Force in March the following year. Ranked flying officer (honorary flight lieutenant), he was one of the original twenty-one officers on the Air Force's strength at its formation, and became popularly known as "Luke". In February 1922, he surveyed the air route between Perth and Port Augusta, South Australia. He took part in one of the embryonic service's earliest public flying displays in May that year, when he and another pilot flew Airco DH.9s in mock dogfights with four Royal Aircraft Factory S.E.5s during the New South Wales Aerial Pageant at Victoria Park, Sydney. On 21 January 1925, he married Florence St Aubyn Allen at St Mary's Anglican Church, West Perth; the couple later had two sons. The previous year, Lukis had been best man at the wedding of Squadron Leader Frank McNamara, the AFC's only Victoria Cross recipient in World War I.

No. 3 Squadron was re-formed at RAAF Point Cook, Victoria, on 1 July 1925, with Lukis as commanding officer (CO). Over the next week, operating DH.9s and S.E.5s, the unit established itself at the Air Force's newest base, RAAF Station Richmond, New South Wales. Alerted to a forthcoming inspection by the Chief of the Air Staff, Group Captain Richard Williams, Lukis had the foresight to engage in a speedy beautification program at the base, arranging delivery of pot plants and shrubs; the notoriously fastidious Williams concluded the inspection by pronouncing himself "happily surprised ... that so much had been done so quickly". For the duration of his tour as No. 3 Squadron commander, Lukis doubled as CO of the base. He was promoted squadron leader on 2 July 1927, and handed over command to Squadron Leader Harry Cobby on 13 January 1930. Lukis served as CO of No. 1 Squadron from 1930 to 1934, interrupted in 1931 by a posting to Britain to attend RAF Staff College, Andover. Raised to wing commander, he was placed in charge of No. 1 Aircraft Depot at RAAF Station Laverton, Victoria, in 1936. He held command of No. 1 Flying Training School at Point Cook from January 1938 to November 1939, receiving appointment as an Officer of the Order of the British Empire in the 1938 King's Birthday Honours, and promotion to group captain in July the same year.

== World War II ==
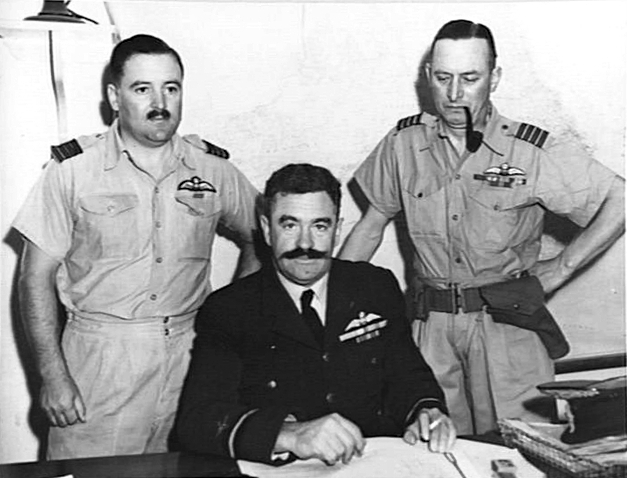
Air Commodore Lukis (centre) hands over North-Eastern Area Command to Group Captain Harry Cobby (right) in August 1942

The CO of RAAF Station Laverton from December 1939, Lukis was made acting air commodore and posted to Townsville, Queensland, on 8 May 1941 as the inaugural Air Officer Commanding (AOC) Northern Area. Described by Major General Lewis H. Brereton, commander of the US Far East Air Force, as "a dark, husky, energetic man with a keen sense of humour" who was very much "alive to the situation", Lukis was in charge of air defence for the north coast of Australia. His task was complicated by the poor standard and quantity of available equipment, with only CAC Wirraways as fighters. In January 1942, Northern Area was split into North-Western Area and North-Eastern Area, Lukis remaining in charge of the latter as a temporary air commodore. The following month, he warned higher command of the poor state of preparedness and low morale of Australian Army troops at Port Moresby, New Guinea, due to lack of air cover and apparent lack of interest from government echelons. In March, seventeen P-40 Kittyhawks of No. 75 Squadron, newly formed under North-Eastern Area Command, were deployed; the unit would shortly distinguish itself in the Battle of Port Moresby.

By the end of April 1942, Lukis' forces consisted of three squadrons (general purpose, transport, and fighter) at Townsville, one general purpose squadron at RAAF Station Amberley in southern Queensland, and four squadrons (three general purpose and one fighter) at Port Moresby. Posted to RAAF Headquarters, Melbourne, as Air Member for Personnel, he handed over command of North-Eastern Area to Group Captain (later Air Commodore) Harry Cobby on 25 August. On 23 March 1943, Lukis was appointed a Commander of the Order of the British Empire for the "courage, enterprise and devotion" that he had displayed at North-Eastern Area. As Air Member for Personnel, he occupied a seat on the Air Board, the RAAF's controlling body that was chaired by the Chief of the Air Staff. In this position he clashed with Group Officer Clare Stevenson, Director of the Women's Auxiliary Australian Air Force, over plans to reduce the number of female officers in technical roles. Stevenson was forced to apologise to Lukis for going over his head to the Deputy Chief of the Air Staff to voice her opposition to the scheme; nevertheless, cuts to these positions did not eventuate.

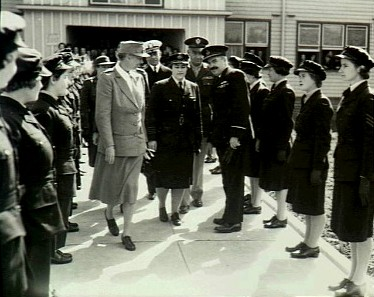
Lukis (right of centre) as Air Member for Personnel, with Eleanor Roosevelt (left of centre) and Group Officer Clare Stevenson (centre) before a WAAAF Guard of Honour in Melbourne, 1943

In November 1943, Lukis took over No. 9 Operational Group (No. 9 OG), the RAAF's main mobile formation in the Pacific at the time, after its commander, Air Commodore Joe Hewitt, was sacked by the Chief of the Air Staff, Air Vice Marshal George Jones, over allegations of poor discipline and morale. The change in leadership dismayed the US-led South West Pacific Area Command, whose senior air officers, Lieutenant General George Kenney and Major General Ennis Whitehead, did not hold Lukis in the same high regard that they did his predecessor. For the next two months, No. 9 OG supported the Allied invasion of New Britain. On 17 January 1944, Lukis mounted an operation with a force of seventy-three aircraft comprising Bristol Beaufort light bombers and Kittyhawk and Spitfire fighters, the largest strike undertaken by the Australians to that date. It encountered no opposition, and Lukis voiced his concerns to Whitehead that the "mopping up" role he had been assigned was costing his fighter pilots the opportunity to engage in air-to-air combat.

As the Pacific conflict shifted further north, No. 9 OG's operational tasking lessened and it became colloquially known in the RAAF as the "Non-Ops Group". When ordered to transfer one of his fighter wings, No. 73, to the Admiralty Islands for convoy escort in late February, Lukis complained directly to Kenney that it was a waste of resources, but was over-ruled. The rest of No. 9 OG became a garrison force in New Guinea, and was renamed Northern Command on 11 April 1944 to better reflect this new status; its original mobile strike role was taken over by No. 10 Operational Group (later the Australian First Tactical Air Force). Lukis was again considered for the position of Air Member for Personnel when the incumbent, acting Air Vice Marshal Adrian Cole, was removed from his position following accusations of drunkenness at an RAAF Headquarters meeting in November 1944. In the event, Lukis remained in charge of Northern Command. The following April, he took command of No. 2 Training Group in Melbourne, and held this post for the remainder of the Pacific War.

== Later life ==
Lukis took up his final RAAF posting, as Air Officer Commanding Eastern Area, in December 1945. With the end of hostilities, he was summarily retired along with several other senior commanders and veterans of World War I, ostensibly to make way for the advancement of younger and equally capable officers. According to RAAF historian Alan Stephens, the Air Board believed that Lukis "had not taken a role commensurate with his seniority during the war, a strange accusation to make against a man who had been Air Member for Personnel and AOC of the RAAF's most important operational group in the Southwest Pacific Area". He was officially discharged on 2 May 1946. Employed by Australian National Airways (ANA) after leaving the Air Force, Lukis become airfield manager at Essendon, Melbourne. He took over the airline's Canberra office in 1952, before joining a stockbroking firm in 1957, the year that ANA merged with Ansett Airways to become Ansett-ANA. Active in veterans' organisations, he served as president of the Air Force Association in Victoria during 1947–48, and helped found the Commonwealth Club in Canberra in 1954. Survived by his wife and children, Frank Lukis died in Melbourne of cancer on 18 February 1966, and was cremated.

== Notes ==
Military offices
New title Command formed from the eastern portion of Northern Area Command	Air Officer Commanding North-Eastern Area Command; 1942	Succeeded by Harry Cobby
New title Command formed from No. 9 Operational Group	Air Officer Commanding Northern Command; 1944–1945	Succeeded by Allan Walters
Preceded by Henry Wrigley	Air Member for Personnel; 1942–1943	Succeeded by William Anderson
