= Northern Area Command (RAAF) =

Royal Australian Air Force command

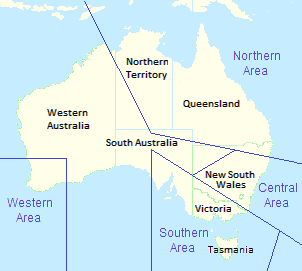
- Provisional RAAF area command boundaries, February 1940
- Active: 1941–42
- Allegiance: Australia
- Branch: Royal Australian Air Force
- Role: Air defence Aerial reconnaissance Protection of adjacent sea lanes
- Garrison/HQ: Townsville, Queensland
- Engagements: World War II

Commanders
- Notable commanders: Frank Lukis (1941–42)

Northern Area Command was one of several geographically based commands raised by the Royal Australian Air Force (RAAF) during World War II. It was formed in May 1941, and covered northern Australia and Papua. Headquartered at Townsville, Queensland, Northern Area Command was responsible for air defence, aerial reconnaissance and protection of the sea lanes within its boundaries. In January 1942, following the outbreak of the Pacific War, it was divided into North-Western and North-Eastern Area Commands, to counter Japanese threats to northern Australia and Papua, respectively.

== History ==
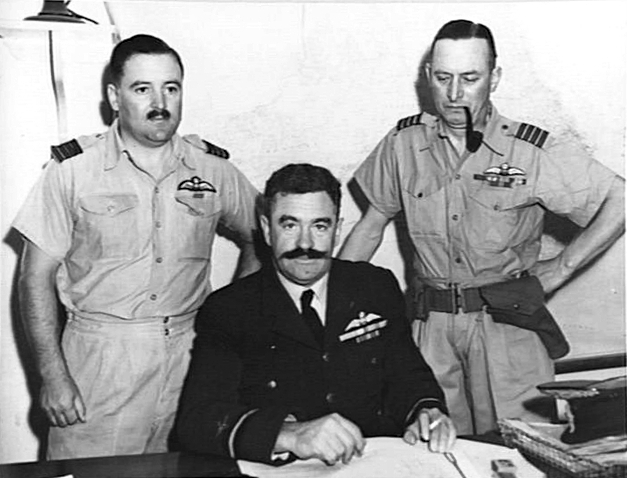
Air Commodore Lukis (centre), who served as Air Officer Commanding Northern Area throughout its existence, with Group Captains Bill Garing (left) and Harry Cobby in Townsville, Queensland

Prior to World War II, the Royal Australian Air Force was small enough for all its elements to be directly controlled by RAAF Headquarters in Melbourne. After war broke out, the RAAF began to decentralise its command structure, commensurate with expected increases in manpower and units. Between March 1940 and May 1941, it divided Australia and Papua into four geographically based command-and-control zones: Central Area, Southern Area, Western Area, and Northern Area. The roles of these area commands were air defence, protection of adjacent sea lanes, and aerial reconnaissance. Each was led by an Air Officer Commanding (AOC) responsible for the administration and operations of air bases and units within his boundary.

Northern Area Command, headquartered in Townsville, Queensland, was formed on 8 May 1941 under the leadership of Air Commodore Frank Lukis. The command controlled units in northern New South Wales, Queensland, the Northern Territory, and Papua. Lukis was thus responsible for air defence along the entire north coast of Australia. The main air base in the Northern Territory, RAAF Station Darwin, was augmented by eight satellite bases in the region. Between June and November 1941, Northern Area took the lead in tracking Japanese pearl luggers, whose increased presence off north-western Australia was regarded as "significant" by intelligence services. Central Area was disbanded in August and its responsibilities divided between Northern Area, Southern Area, and the newly formed No. 2 (Training) Group in Sydney.

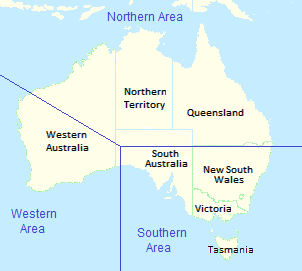
RAAF area commands, December 1941

By December 1941, Lukis' frontline strength in the Northern Territory consisted of No. 2 Squadron flying Lockheed Hudsons, No. 12 Squadron flying CAC Wirraways, and No. 13 Squadron flying Hudsons, all based at RAAF Station Darwin. When the Pacific War broke out, Nos. 2 and 13 Squadrons deployed forces to advanced operational bases at Koepang, Laha and Namlea in the Dutch East Indies. Nos. 11 and 20 Squadrons, flying PBY Catalinas, were based at Port Moresby in Papua and No. 24 Squadron, flying Hudsons and Wirraways, at Rabaul in New Britain. Northern Area Command was instructed to "strike at Japanese bases or shipping wherever possible", "obtain such warning as is possible of any attempted southward movements by the Japanese", "keep open the shipping routes through the Coral, Arafura and Timor Seas", and "deny enemy access to Rabaul and to the Territories of New Guinea, Papua and the Mainland of Australia". Nos. 2, 11, 13, 20 and 24 Squadrons undertook reconnaissance, maritime patrol and sporadic bombing missions against Japanese targets in the Dutch East Indies and Torres Strait. Short of modern fighters and sufficient numbers of bombers, the RAAF units were, according to the official history of Australia in the war, "virtually powerless" to either attack or defend against Japanese forces building up in the region.

On 15 January 1942, Northern Area was split into North-Western Area and North-Eastern Area, to counter distinct Japanese threats to LAmbon and Darwin in the former case, and Rabaul and Port Moresby in the latter. Lukis remained at Townsville as AOC of the new North-Eastern Area Command. North-Western Area Command was headquartered at Darwin, Northern Territory; its inaugural AOC was Air Commodore Douglas Wilson.

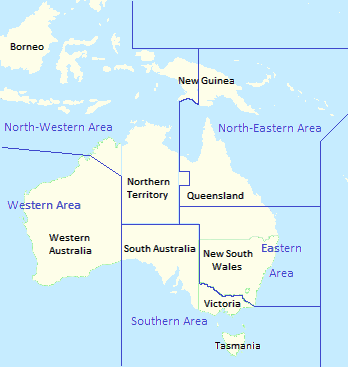
RAAF area commands, November 1942

== Aftermath ==
Following the end of the war, the Chief of the Air Staff, Air Vice Marshal George Jones, proposed reducing the five extant mainland area commands (North-Western, North-Eastern, Eastern, Southern, and Western Areas) to three. One of these would have been Northern Area, covering Queensland and the Northern Territory. The Australian Government rejected the plan and the wartime area command boundaries essentially remained in place until supplanted in 1953–54 by a functional command-and-control system made up of Home (operational), Training, and Maintenance Commands.
