= No. 9 Operational Group RAAF =

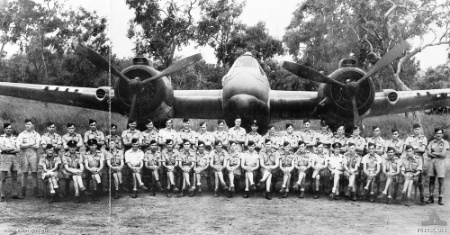
- Personnel of No. 30 Squadron, part of No. 73 Wing, No. 9 Operational Group, with a Beaufighter in New Guinea, 1943
- Active: 1942–44
- Country: Australia
- Branch: Royal Australian Air Force
- Role: Fighter; ground attack
- Size: Two combat wings
- Engagements: World War II: New Guinea campaign; Battle of the Bismarck Sea; Bombing of Rabaul; New Britain campaign; Battle of Arawe

Commanders
- Notable commanders: Bill Garing (1942–43); Joe Hewitt (1943); Frank Lukis (1943–44)

Aircraft flown
- Attack: Beaufort; Beaufighter
- Bomber: Hudson; Boston
- Fighter: Kittyhawk

No. 9 Operational Group was a major Royal Australian Air Force (RAAF) formation providing fighter, ground-attack and anti-shipping support to the Allies in the South West Pacific theatre during World War II. Established in September 1942, it acted as a mobile striking force independent of the RAAF's static area commands. As the war in the Pacific progressed, No. 9 Operational Group itself developed into an area command called Northern Command, responsible for garrisoning New Guinea.

== History ==
No. 9 Operational Group (No. 9 OG) was formed in New Guinea in September 1942, consisting of seven RAAF squadrons attached to the USAAF's Fifth Air Force. Four of the squadrons were based at Milne Bay and three at Port Moresby. On its establishment it was the RAAF's "premier fighting unit" in the South West Pacific Area (SWPA). Its first commander was Group Captain Bill Garing.

Administratively, No. 9 OG initially came under the control of RAAF North-Eastern Area Command. On 1 January 1943, Headquarters No. 9 OG assumed responsibility for the formation's administration as well as its operations, making it independent of North-Eastern Area. Air Commodore Joe Hewitt became Air Officer Commanding No. 9 OG in February 1943. The same month, the Group's squadrons were reorganised into two wings: No. 71 Wing, covering the units in Milne Bay, and No. 73 Wing, those in Port Moresby.

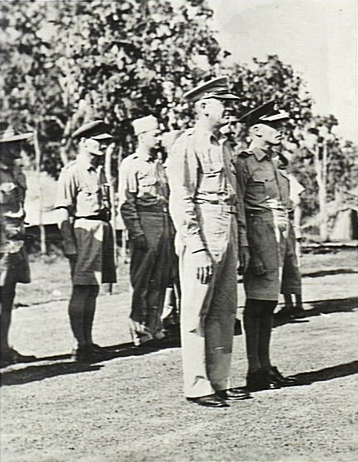
Air Commodore Hewitt, right, with Major General Whitehead, New Guinea, 1943

In March the group provided the RAAF's contribution to the Battle of the Bismarck Sea, "the decisive aerial engagement" in the SWPA according to General Douglas MacArthur, resulting in twelve Japanese ships being sunk. Between July and October 1943, No. 9 OG was expanded to include a works wing and a radio location wing, its complement of operational squadrons totalling nine, plus a torpedo bomber detachment. Its aircraft carried out operations against enemy bases, shipping and lines of communication along the coast of New Britain. In October–November the group launched a number of major assaults on Rabaul, bombing and strafing ground and naval targets.

Although Hewitt was performing an "excellent job" according to Fifth Air Force commander Major General Ennis Whitehead, he was transferred from his post in November 1943 by the Chief of the Air Staff, Air Vice Marshal George Jones, over accusations of poor discipline within No. 9 OG. He was replaced by Air Commodore Frank Lukis, who had commanded North-Eastern Area in 1942.

In December 1943, No. 9 OG's Kittyhawks took part in a series of attacks culminating in the Battle of Arawe. As the Pacific conflict gradually shifted further north, operational tasking lessened and No. 9 OG became colloquially known in the RAAF as the "Non-Ops Group". It assumed the duties of a garrison force in New Guinea and was renamed Northern Command on 11 April 1944, to better reflect its new function. Its mobile strike role was taken over by No. 10 Operational Group (later renamed the Australian First Tactical Air Force), which had been formed on 13 November 1943.

== Order of battle ==
Upon its establishment in September 1942, No. 9 OG consisted of the following units:

- Based at Milne Bay:
  - No. 6 Squadron (Hudson)
  - No. 75 Squadron (P-40 Kittyhawk)
  - No. 77 Squadron (P-40 Kittyhawk)
  - No. 100 Squadron (Beaufort)
- Based at Port Moresby:
  - No. 4 Squadron (Wirraway)
  - No. 22 Squadron (Boston)
  - No. 30 Squadron (Beaufighter)

In February 1943 the squadrons at Milne Bay became part of No. 71 Wing, while those at Port Moresby formed No. 73 Wing, both wing headquarters reporting to No. 9 OG.
