= RAAF Support Command =

Support Command
- Active: 1959–90
- Country: Australia
- Branch: Royal Australian Air Force
- Headquarters: Melbourne

Commanders
- Notable commanders: Allan Walters (1959–62); Frank Headlam (1966–67); Colin Hannah (1968–69)

Support Command was an organisation in the Royal Australian Air Force (RAAF). Headquartered in Melbourne, it was formed in 1959 from the amalgamation of RAAF Training and Maintenance Commands. Support Command was split into Logistics Command and Training Command in 1990. In 1997, logistics management became the responsibility of Support Command (Air Force), the RAAF component of the Defence-wide Support Command Australia (later subsumed by the Defence Materiel Organisation).
