= No. 100 Squadron RAAF =

Royal Australian Air Force squadron

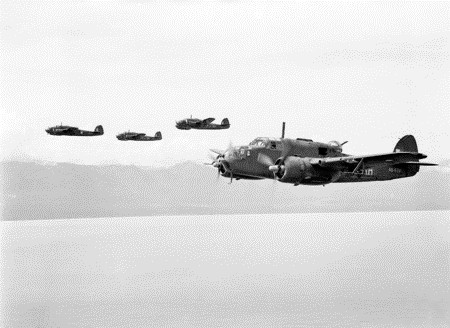
- Four No. 100 Squadron Beauforts near the New Guinea coastline in 1945
- Active: 1942–1946; 2021–current
- Country: Australia
- Branch: Royal Australian Air Force
- Role: Bomber (1942–1946); Historic aircraft display (2021–current)
- Part of: No. 9 Operational Group RAAF (World War II); Air Force Training Group (current)
- Current base: RAAF Base Point Cook
- Mottos: Then, Now, Always (2021–current)
- Engagements: World War II

Commanders
- Notable commanders: John Balmer (1942–1943)

Aircraft flown
- Bomber: Bristol Beaufort (1942–1946)

No. 100 Squadron is a Royal Australian Air Force (RAAF) historic aircraft display squadron. It was originally formed as a bomber and maritime patrol squadron that operated during World War II. Raised in early 1942 from the remnants of a British unit that had been destroyed in Malaya, the squadron flew Bristol Beauforts from bases in Queensland and New Guinea, undertaking torpedo- and level-bombing sorties against Japanese targets in the Pacific theatre. Following the conclusion of hostilities, the squadron was disbanded in August 1946. It was reformed as the Air Force Heritage Squadron in January 2021 to operate airworthy warbirds.

== History ==
=== World War II ===
No. 100 Squadron was formed at RAAF Station Richmond, New South Wales, on 15 February 1942; the following month Wing Commander John Balmer took command of the squadron. The squadron was formed from a nucleus of No. 100 Squadron RAF, which had been destroyed during the Malayan Campaign, and was named in that unit's honour. Despite this link, No. 100 Squadron RAAF was an Australian squadron throughout its existence and considered to be separate from its British namesake, which was re-formed as a heavy bomber squadron in Britain on 15 December 1942. The unit subsequently moved to Mareeba, Queensland, in May 1942, before conducting further training and anti-submarine patrols.

Staging through Port Moresby, No. 100 Squadron flew its first combat missions in June 1942, making it the first of the RAAF's Beaufort bomber-equipped squadrons to see combat. During the mission seven aircraft bombed targets around Lae, losing one aircraft whilst sinking a Japanese merchant ship. Later a number of successful attacks were completed against Japanese positions. Following these attacks the squadron was withdrawn to Laverton in July, subsequently conducting patrols off New South Wales and Victoria and undertaking further training. A further move was later undertaken to Bohle River in Queensland. Meanwhile, after completing its training the squadron commenced deploying to Milne Bay in New Guinea in September 1942.

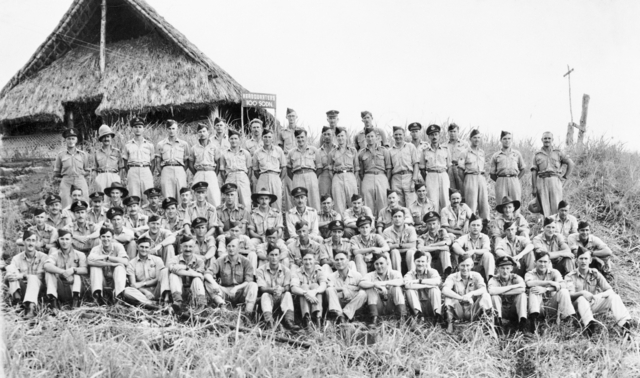
No. 100 Squadron aircrew outside their headquarters hut on Goodenough Island in 1944

In October 1942, while participating in a training exercise off the coast of Townsville, Beaufort A9-26 of the No. 100 Squadron struck the mast of the wrecked SS City of Adelaide in Cockle Bay, Magnetic Island. The aircraft plunged into the shallow water below and the fuselage disintegrated on impact killing three RAAF officers and one US Navy officer aboard. On 6 October 1942 the Squadron conducted its first torpedo strike, with six Beauforts unsuccessfully targeting Japanese naval vessels. Over the following months the squadron conducted a number of dangerous low-level attacks with limited success, although a number of Japanese vessels were damaged or sunk. On 9 January 1943 a convoy returning from Lae was intercepted by six Beauforts off Gasmata. A Japanese cruiser was believed sunk in the action, for the loss of two aircraft.

Flying from bases in eastern New Guinea No. 100 Squadron flew reconnaissance patrols and anti-shipping and bombing missions against the Japanese in the Solomon Islands and New Guinea mainland. Eight aircraft from the squadron participated in the Battle of the Bismarck Sea, during which the squadron conducted a torpedo-bombing mission. It was not successful in sinking any ships in this battle, though, and from March 1943 it operated solely in the level bombing role. Later, in September 1943, the squadron flew anti-submarine patrols in support of amphibious landings around Lae. On 4 October, ten Beauforts made a low-level attack on the Japanese airfield at Gasmata, with three aircraft being shot down. A surfaced submarine was attacked and heavily damaged in St George's Channel on 18 October. The squadron bombed a bridge over the Anwek River in November as part of an air offensive over New Britain and the same month moved to Goodenough Island.

The squadron remained at Goodenough Island until April 1944, when it relocated to Nadzab. This was followed by a further move to Tadji in July 1944. As a level bomber squadron, No. 100 Squadron conducted missions against Japanese facilities throughout New Guinea and surrounding islands during 1944, including the key base at Rabaul. In late 1944 and into 1945, it conducted operations in support of Allied ground operations. In October 1944, a detachment of five aircraft and crews from No. 100 Squadron being sent to reinforce No. 6 Squadron, which had been tasked to support Australian landings on New Britain. Prior to the landings, the Beauforts attacked targets across the Gazelle Peninsula, and then remained on standby to support the Landing at Jacquinot Bay. Later, further operations were flown around Wide Bay. The squadron's attention then turned to support of the 6th Division's campaign in Aitape–Wewak. The squadron continued in this role until the last day of the war, flying its final bombing mission the morning Japan surrendered, on 15 August 1945.

Following the end of hostilities, No. 100 Squadron flew reconnaissance missions and leaflet drops before transferring to Finschafen in March 1946. There it undertook ferrying and courier flights until disbanding on 19 August 1946; prior to this, the squadron's strength had dwindled as personnel were repatriated back to Australia for demobilisation or transferred to other units for subsequent service with the occupation forces in Japan. Throughout the war a total of 115 aircrew fatalities were recorded among the squadron's personnel as a result of combat operations.

=== Air Force Heritage Squadron ===
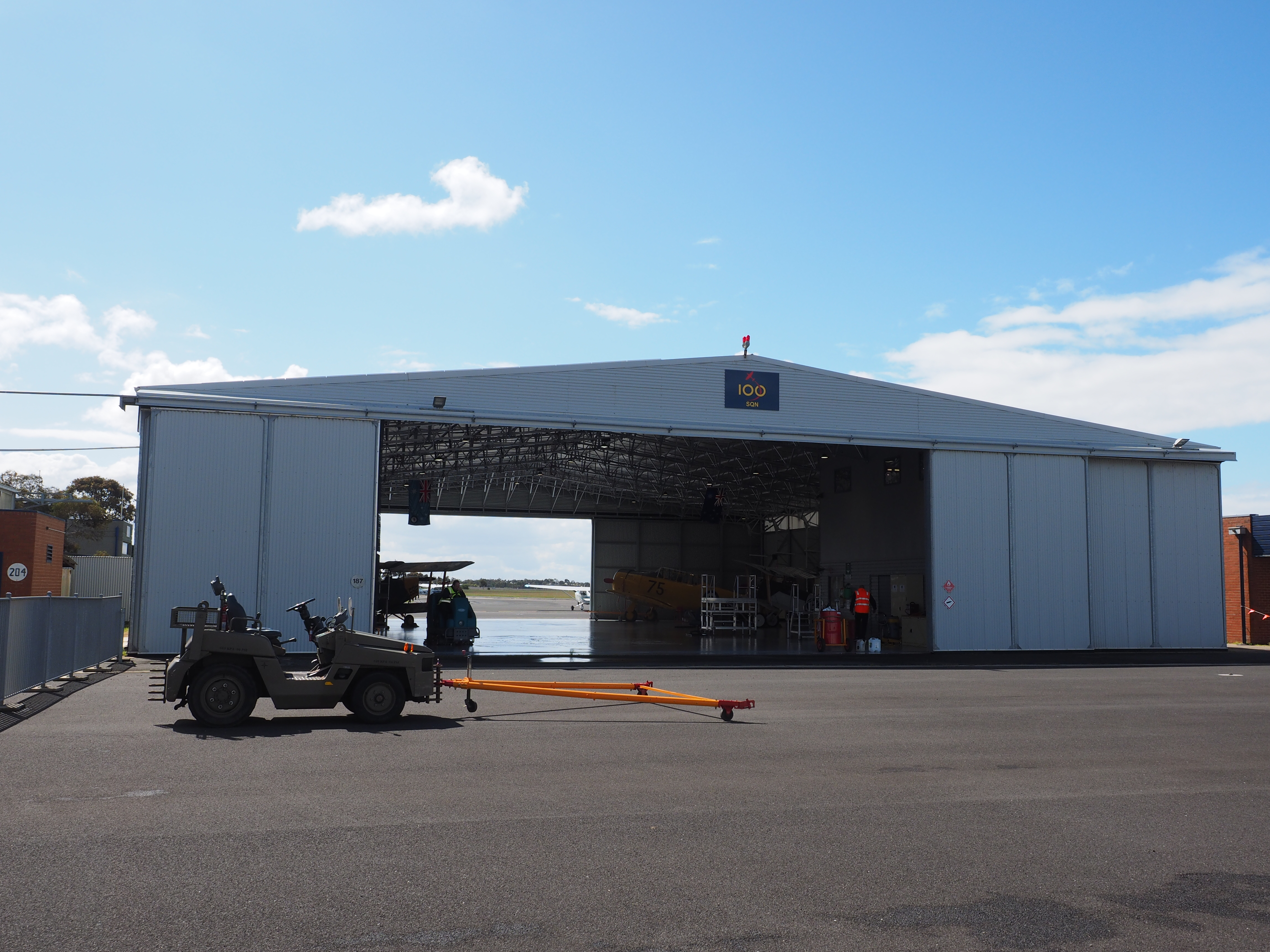
No. 100 Squadron's hanger at RAAF Base Point Cook in 2025

On 1 January 2021, the RAAF reformed No. 100 Squadron as the Air Force Heritage Squadron, under the Air Force Training Group, to operate the heritage aircraft as airworthy warbirds. It comprises the Point Cook Heritage Flight at RAAF Base Point Cook and the Temora Historic Flight at Temora Aviation Museum.

Ownership of 12 historically significant aircraft was transferred from the Temora Aviation Museum to the RAAF in July 2019 and operated by the RAAF as the Temora Historic Flight. They are maintained by museum staff and pilots are inducted into the RAAF Reserve.

It was announced in January 2026 that eight of No. 100 Squadron's aircraft would be retired. This change was made to reduce the number of types in service and followed an assessment of technical issues associated with operating vintage aircraft.

== Current aircraft ==
All are airworthy, except as noted.

Aircraft	Civil registration	RAAF serial	Image	Notes
Point Cook Heritage Flight
CAC CA-18 Mustang Mk.23	VH-SVU	A68-170		
PAC CT/4A	VH-NZP	A19-077		
North American AT-6D	VH-HVD	NZ1075		
Royal Aircraft Factory R.E.8	VH-OTF	0003		Replica
CAC Winjeel	VH-FTS	A85-439		
de Havilland Tiger Moth	VH-AWA	A17-692		
Sopwith Pup	VH-PSP			Replica
Sopwith Snipe	VH-SNP	E8050		Replica
Curtiss P-40E Kittyhawk		A29-90		Under restoration
Temora Historic Flight
English Electric Canberra TT18	VH-ZSQ			To be “transitioned with dignity” out of service
Lockheed Hudson Mk III	VH-KOY			
Cessna A-37 Dragonfly	VH-XVA			To be “transitioned with dignity” out of service
Supermarine Spitfire Mk.VIII	VH-HET			
Supermarine Spitfire Mk.XVI	VH-XVI			
Gloster Meteor F8	VH-MBX	A79-851		To be “transitioned with dignity” out of service
de Havilland Vampire T.35	VH-VAM	A79-617		To be “transitioned with dignity” out of service
CAC Sabre	VH-IPN	A94-983		To be “transitioned with dignity” out of service
CAC Wirraway Mk 3	VH-BFF	A20-653		
CAC Boomerang	VH-MHR	A46-122		
de Havilland Tiger Moth	VH-UVZ	A17-691		
Ryan STM	VH-RSY			To be “transitioned with dignity” out of service
