= Western Area Command (RAAF) =

Royal Australian Air Force command

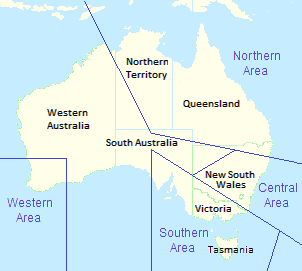
- Provisional RAAF area command boundaries, February 1940
- Active: 1941–1956
- Allegiance: Australia
- Branch: Royal Australian Air Force
- Role: Air defence Aerial reconnaissance Protection of adjacent sea lanes
- Garrison/HQ: Perth
- Engagements: World War II

Commanders
- Notable commanders: Hippolyte De La Rue (1941–42); Raymond Brownell (1942–45); Colin Hannah (1945, 1946); Douglas Wilson (1945); Bill Garing (1946–48); William Hely (1951–53)

Western Area Command was one of several geographically based commands raised by the Royal Australian Air Force (RAAF) during World War II. It was formed in January 1941, and controlled RAAF units located in Western Australia. Headquartered in Perth, Western Area Command was responsible for air defence, aerial reconnaissance and protection of the sea lanes within its boundaries. Its aircraft conducted anti-submarine operations throughout the war, and attacked targets in the Dutch East Indies during the Borneo campaign in 1945.

The area command continued to operate after the war, but its assets and staffing were much reduced. Its responsibilities were subsumed in February 1954 by the RAAF's new functional commands: Home (operational), Training, and Maintenance Commands. Western Area headquarters was disbanded in November 1956.

== History ==
=== World War II ===
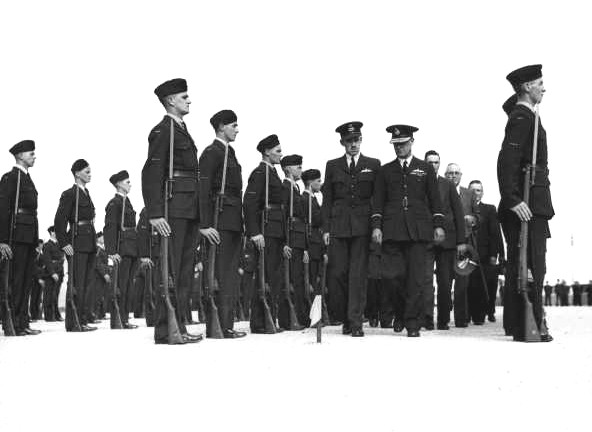
Air Commodore De La Rue (braided cap), inaugural AOC Western Area, inspecting pilot trainees, c. 1941

Prior to World War II, the Royal Australian Air Force was small enough for all its elements to be directly controlled by RAAF Headquarters in Melbourne. After war broke out in September 1939, the Air Force began to decentralise its command structure, commensurate with expected increases in manpower and units. Between March 1940 and May 1941, the RAAF divided Australia and New Guinea into four geographically based command-and-control zones: Central Area, Southern Area, Western Area, and Northern Area. The roles of these area commands were air defence, protection of adjacent sea lanes, and aerial reconnaissance. Each was led by an Air Officer Commanding (AOC) responsible for the administration and operations of all air bases and units within his boundary.

Western Area Command, headquartered in Perth, was formed on 9 January 1941 to control all RAAF units in Western Australia. These included No. 14 (General Reconnaissance) Squadron, No. 25 (General Purpose) Squadron and No. 5 Initial Training School at RAAF Station Pearce; No. 9 Elementary Flying Training School at Cunderdin; and the soon-to-be-raised No. 4 Service Flying Training School at Geraldton. RAAF Headquarters had maintained control of Western Australian units pending the area's formation. Western Area's inaugural AOC was Group Captain (acting Air Commodore) Hippolyte "Kanga" De La Rue. His senior air staff officer was Group Captain Alan Charlesworth. Headquarters staff numbered forty-one, including fifteen officers. No. 14 Squadron, operating Lockheed Hudsons, and No. 25 Squadron, flying CAC Wirraways, were responsible for convoy escort and anti-submarine patrol. Shortly after taking command, De La Rue lobbied RAAF Headquarters for a force of long-range Catalina flying boats to augment No. 14 Squadron's Hudsons, but none were made available.

By mid-1941, RAAF Headquarters had decided to form training units in the southern and eastern states into semi-geographical, semi-functional groups separate to the area commands. This led to the establishment in August of No. 1 (Training) Group in Melbourne, covering Victoria, Tasmania and South Australia, and No. 2 (Training) Group in Sydney, covering New South Wales and Queensland. At the same time, Central Area was dissolved and its responsibilities divided between Southern and Northern Areas, and No. 2 (Training) Group. Western Area, uniquely among the area commands, retained responsibility for training, as well as operations and maintenance, within its boundaries. In November 1941, all available aircraft from Nos. 14 and 25 Squadrons, as well as eight Avro Ansons from No. 4 Service Flying Training School, took part in the search for HMAS Sydney after it was sunk by the German raider Kormoran; a Hudson and an Anson each located lifeboats bearing Kormoran's crew.

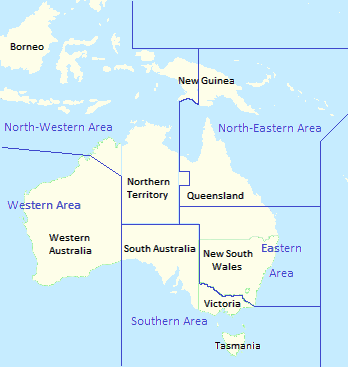
RAAF area commands in November 1942; Western Area's boundaries remained in place until the transition to a functional command system that commenced in 1953.

In January 1942, Northern Area was split into North-Western and North-Eastern Areas, to counter separate Japanese threats to Northern Australia and New Guinea, respectively, following the outbreak of the Pacific War. In May, a new area command, Eastern Area, was raised to control units within New South Wales and southern Queensland. Of geographical necessity, the operational responsibilities of the RAAF's southerly areas centred on maritime patrol and anti-submarine warfare, while the northern commands concentrated on air defence and offensive bombing. Aircraft from Western Area made their first submarine attack on 2 March, but it was the USS Sargo, which had not identified itself; the American submarine was damaged but continued on to Fremantle. Identification of friendly vessels was an ongoing issue; RAAF patrols often had to depart without the latest naval intelligence reports on Allied shipping, and ships could in any case divert from their planned routes. It was often difficult for observers in fast-moving aircraft to make out Allied signal flags on a ship, and ships' crews did not always immediately recognise RAAF aircraft even when the latter employed their Aldis lamps to identify themselves.

No. 35 (Transport) Squadron, operating de Havilland Fox Moth and DH.84 Dragon aircraft, was raised under Western Area's control at Pearce on 4 March 1942. No. 77 Squadron, equipped with P-40 Kittyhawks, was formed at Pearce on 16 March; it was at this time the only fighter squadron available to defend Perth and Fremantle, and De La Rue worked assiduously to prepare it for operations. No. 6 Fighter Sector Headquarters, Perth, became operational on 2 May. The same month, the Air Board proposed raising No. 3 (Training) Group and No. 8 (Maintenance) Group to control training and maintenance units in Western Australia but, though approved by the Federal government, this did not take place. By 31 May, Western Area headquarters staff numbered 247, including 76 officers.

As of 20 April 1942, operational authority over RAAF combat infrastructure, including the area commands, was invested in the newly established Allied Air Forces Headquarters under South West Pacific Area Command (SWPA). Some fine-tuning of Western Area's boundaries occurred in August: North-Western Area, as well as controlling the Northern Territory, was given responsibility for the portion of Western Australia north of a line drawn south-east from Yampi Sound to the Northern Territory border. September 1942 saw the formation of RAAF Command, led by Air Vice Marshal Bill Bostock, to oversee the majority of Australian flying units in the SWPA. Bostock exercised control of air operations through the area commands, although RAAF Headquarters continued to hold administrative authority over all Australian units. In November, construction began on an airfield under Western Area's control at Corunna Downs, near Port Hedland. Australia's closest air base to Surabaya, it would serve as a staging post for Allied bombers bound for targets in the Dutch East Indies, allowing them to avoid Japanese fighter stations between the Northern Territory and Java. De la Rue handed over Western Area to Air Commodore Raymond Brownell in December 1942; by the end of the month, headquarters staff numbered 488, including 95 officers.

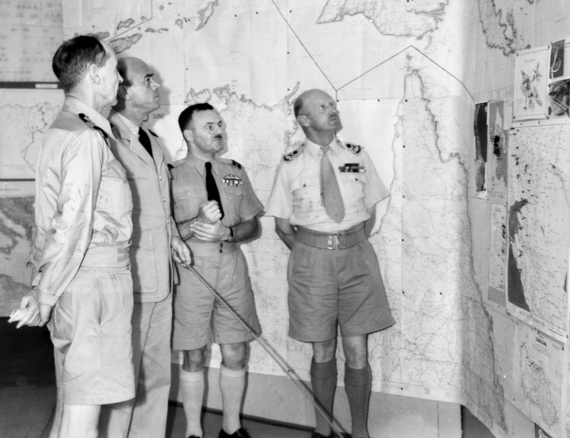
Air Commodore Brownell (second right), Lieutenant-General Bennett (far right) and Allied naval officers discussing an SWPA situation map, February 1943

By April 1943, Western Area controlled four combat units: No. 14 Squadron, flying Bristol Beaufort reconnaissance-bombers out of Pearce; No. 25 Squadron, tasked with dive-bombing missions in Wirraways based at Pearce; No. 76 Squadron, flying P-40 Kittyhawks out of Potshot (Exmouth Gulf); and No. 85 Squadron, operating CAC Boomerang fighters from Pearce. The area command was also able to call on US Navy Catalinas of Patrol Wing 10, based at Crawley, for reconnaissance and anti-submarine missions. The Beauforts and Catalinas flew several hundred maritime patrols during 1943. In March 1944, Western Area went on high alert in response to concerns that a Japanese naval force would raid Western Australia. Perth was reinforced with Nos. 452 and 457 Squadrons, and Exmouth Gulf with Nos. 18, 31, and 120 Squadrons, but no attack ensued and the units were directed to return to their home bases. The US Navy withdrew Patrol Wing 10 mid-year, curtailing Western Area's ability to conduct long-range maritime reconnaissance; No. 14 Squadron's fifteen serviceable Beauforts had to fly patrols of up to twenty-two hours in duration to search for German submarines reported in the area. As of 31 May 1944, Western Area headquarters staff numbered 686, including 118 officers.

Having converted to Vultee Vengeance dive bombers in August 1943, No. 25 Squadron moved from Pearce to Cunderdin in January 1945 and re-equipped with B-24 Liberator heavy bombers. The Liberators were employed on anti-submarine patrol off Cape Leeuwin later that month, owing to No. 14 Squadron's Beauforts being fully committed to other tasks. Between April and July, No. 25 Squadron provided Western Area's contribution to the Borneo campaign, supporting the Allied invasions of Tarakan, Labuan–Brunei and Balikpapan. Staging through Corunna Downs, the Liberators bombed Japanese airfields in the Dutch East Indies that were within range of Tarakan, up until the day of the landings on 1 May. They attacked Malang near Surabaya at night prior to the landings at Labuan, and conducted daylight raids against Java in the lead-up to the Balikpapan operation that commenced on 1 July. No. 14 Squadron had ceased its regular anti-submarine patrols on 23 May following the end of hostilities in Europe, but remained on standby in case any U-boats were found to be still active. In July 1945, Brownell was appointed to command the newly formed No. 11 Group on Morotai; he handed Western Area over to his senior air staff officer, Group Captain Colin Hannah, who held temporary command for the remainder of the war.

=== Post-war activity and disbandment ===
On 2 September 1945, following the end of the Pacific War, South West Pacific Area was dissolved and the Air Board again assumed full control of all its operational elements. Hannah handed over Western Area to Group Captain Douglas Wilson in October. The Air Force shrank dramatically with demobilisation; wartime units were scheduled for dissolution in several stages, including reconnaissance-bomber squadrons by the end of 1945, and other bomber units by September 1946. No. 14 Squadron was disbanded at Pearce in December 1945. No. 25 Squadron's Liberators repatriated former prisoners of war from the Dutch East Indies to Australia until January 1946; the unit was disbanded in July that year. Wilson was placed on the retired list in February 1946, and Hannah again assumed temporary command of Western Area until posted to Britain that October. Group Captain Bill Garing took over as Officer Commanding Western Area the following month, by which time headquarters staff numbered 117, including 31 officers.

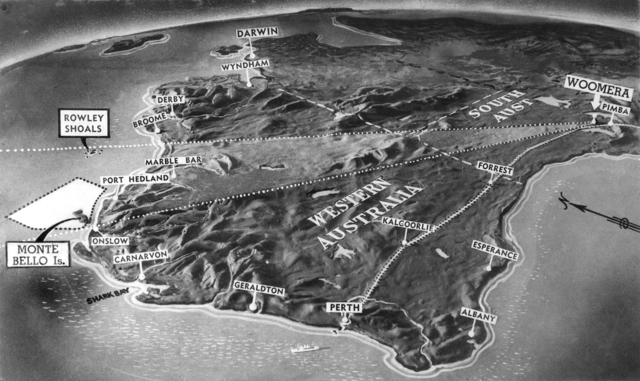
Air Commodore Hely coordinated RAAF support for the British atomic test conducted at Montebello, Western Australia, in October 1952

In September 1946, the Chief of the Air Staff, Air Vice Marshal George Jones, proposed reducing the five extant mainland area commands (North-Western, North-Eastern, Eastern, Southern, and Western Areas) to three: Northern Area, covering Queensland and the Northern Territory; Eastern Area, covering New South Wales; and Southern Area, covering Western Australia, South Australia, Victoria and Tasmania. The Australian Government rejected the plan and the wartime area command boundaries essentially remained in place. No. 25 Squadron re-formed as a Citizen Air Force unit at Pearce in April 1948, operating P-51 Mustangs and, later, de Havilland Vampire fighters. As well as training reservists, the squadron was responsible for Western Australia's air defence. Garing handed over command in November 1948; by the end of the month, Western Area headquarters staff numbered fourteen, including seven officers.

Group Captain (later Air Commodore) Bill Hely took command of Western Area in October 1951. During Operation Hurricane, the British atomic test in the Montebello Islands in October 1952, Hely coordinated air support including supply and observation flights by Dakotas of No. 86 (Transport) Wing. He completed his term as AOC Western Area in September 1953, by which time headquarters staff numbered thirty-one, including fifteen officers.

Beginning in October 1953, the RAAF was reorganised from a geographically based command-and-control system into one based on function. In February 1954, the newly constituted functional organisations—Home, Training, and Maintenance Commands—assumed control of all operations, training and maintenance, respectively, from Western Area Command. Western Area remained in existence but only, according to the Melbourne Argus, as one of Home Command's "remote control points". The area headquarters was disbanded on 30 November 1956.

== Order of battle ==
As at 30 April 1942, Western Area's order of battle comprised:

- RAAF Station Pearce
  - No. 14 (General Reconnaissance) Squadron
  - No. 25 (General Purpose) Squadron
  - No. 35 (Transport) Squadron
  - No. 77 (Fighter) Squadron
- No. 6 Fighter Sector Headquarters, Perth
