= De la Rue (surname) =

De la Rue, De La Rue or Delarue is a surname of French Norman origin. Notable people with the surname include:

- Charles de la Rue (1643–1725), noted orator of the Society of Jesus in France, poet and professor
- Edgar Aubert de la Rüe (1901–1991), French geographer, geologist, traveller and photographer
- Gervais de La Rue (1751–1835), French historical investigator, once regarded as an authorities on Norman and Anglo-Norman literature
- Hippolyte De La Rue (1891–1977), Royal Australian Air Force air commodore
- Jean-Luc Delarue (1964–2012), French French television presenter and producer
- Lucie Delarue-Mardrus (1874–1945), French journalist, poet, novelist, sculptor, historian and designer
- Maurice Delarue (1919–2013), French journalist
- Paul-Henri de Le Rue (born 1984), French snowboarder, 2006 Olympic bronze medalist
- Pierre de la Rue (c. 1452–1518), Franco-Flemish composer and singer
- Thomas de la Rue (1793–1866), printer from Guernsey
- Warren De la Rue (1815–1889), British astronomer and chemist
- De La Rue baronets, various baronets with the surname
- Thomas De La Rue, New Zealand Farming entrepreneur

== See also ==
- LaRue, surname
- de la Rúa, includes a list of people with the name
- De Le Rue
