= Colin Hannah =

Queensland governor (1914–1978)

Sir Colin Thomas Hannah KCMG, KCVO, KBE, CB
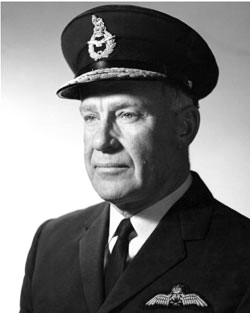
- Official RAAF portrait of Sir Colin Hannah

19th Governor of Queensland
- In office 21 March 1972 – 20 March 1977
- Monarch: Elizabeth II
- Premier: Sir Joh Bjelke-Petersen
- Preceded by: Sir Alan Mansfield
- Succeeded by: Sir James Ramsay

Personal details
- Born: 22 December 1914 Menzies, Western Australia
- Died: 22 May 1978 (aged 63) Surfers Paradise, Queensland
- Profession: Air Force officer

Military service
- Allegiance: Australia
- Branch/service: Royal Australian Air Force
- Service years: 1935–1972
- Rank: Air Marshal
- Commands: No. 6 Squadron (1943); No. 71 Wing (1944); Western Area Command (1945–1946); RAAF Amberley (1949–1951); Operational Command (1965–1967); Support Command (1968–1969); Chief of the Air Staff (1970–1972)
- Battles/wars: World War II; Malayan Emergency; Vietnam War
- Awards: Knight Commander of the Order of St Michael and St George; Knight Commander of the Royal Victorian Order; Knight Commander of the Order of the British Empire; Companion of the Order of the Bath

Air Marshal Sir Colin Thomas Hannah, KCMG, KCVO, KBE, CB (22 December 1914 – 22 May 1978) was a senior commander in the Royal Australian Air Force (RAAF) and a Governor of Queensland. Born in Western Australia, he was a member of the Militia before joining the RAAF in 1935. After graduating as a pilot, Hannah served in Nos. 22 and 23 Squadrons from 1936 to 1939. During the early years of World War II, he was the RAAF's Deputy Director of Armament. He then saw action in the South West Pacific as commander of No. 6 Squadron and, later, No. 71 Wing, operating Bristol Beaufort bombers. By 1944, he had risen to the rank of group captain, and at the end of the war was in charge of Western Area Command in Perth.

Hannah commanded RAAF Station Amberley, Queensland, in 1949–50, and saw service during the Malayan Emergency as senior air staff officer at RAF Far East Air Force Headquarters, Singapore, from 1956 to 1959. His other post-war appointments included Deputy Chief of the Air Staff from 1961 to 1965, Air Officer Commanding (AOC) Operational Command from 1965 to 1967, and AOC Support Command from 1968 to 1969. In January 1970, he was promoted to air marshal and became Chief of the Air Staff (CAS), the RAAF's senior position. Knighted in 1971, Hannah concluded his three-year appointment as CAS a year early, in March 1972, to become Governor of Queensland. He attracted controversy in this role after making comments critical of the Federal government of the day, and the British government refused to agree to his term being extended. Hannah retired in March 1977, and died the following year.

== Early career ==
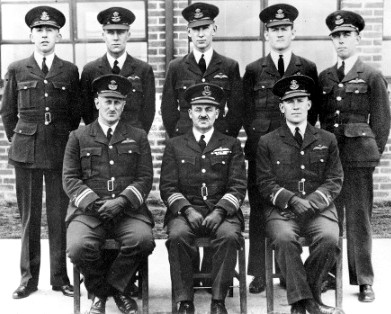
Flying Officer Hannah (front row, right) as adjutant at RAAF Station Pearce, beside Wing Commander Ray Brownell, 1938

Born on 22 December 1914 in Menzies, Western Australia, Hannah was the son of Thomas Howard Hannah, a local mining registrar who later became a clerk of court and then a magistrate in Perth, and his wife Johanna Frame. Hannah attended Hale School, leaving with a Junior Certificate in 1930. He served with an Australian Militia unit, the 8th Field Artillery Brigade, from February 1933, and became a clerk in the Crown Law Department of the State Public Service later that year.

Hannah joined the Royal Australian Air Force on 15 January 1935 as an air cadet at RAAF Station Point Cook, Victoria. After graduating from No. 1 Flying Training School (No. 1 FTS), he obtained his commission as a pilot officer in July 1936. His first posting was to No. 22 Squadron at RAAF Station Richmond, New South Wales. Promoted to flying officer, he was appointed adjutant with the newly formed No. 23 Squadron at RAAF Station Laverton, Victoria, in May 1937. Hannah accompanied the squadron, which operated Hawker Demons and Avro Ansons, to its new location at the recently opened RAAF Station Pearce, Western Australia, in March 1938. On 5 January 1939, he married Patricia Gordon at Claremont; the couple had a daughter. Having specialised as an instructor, he then served on the staff of No. 1 FTS, Point Cook.

== World War II ==
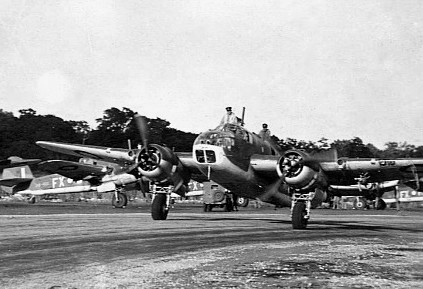
Beauforts of Nos. 6 and 8 Squadron at Goodenough Island, November 1943

Promoted to flight lieutenant, Hannah was posted to Britain in July 1939 to undertake a Royal Air Force armaments training course, which he had barely begun when war was declared on 3 September. He completed the course, and returned to Australia in March 1940. After brief postings to No. 1 Armament School, Point Cook, and Station Headquarters Laverton, he was assigned to Air Force Headquarters, Melbourne, in May. He was made an acting squadron leader in September 1940 and became deputy director of Armament the next year. In April 1942, Hannah was promoted to temporary wing commander. He undertook a general reconnaissance course the following May.

In November 1943, Hannah was appointed commanding officer of No. 6 Squadron at Milne Bay, Papua, flying Bristol Beaufort light bombers. During a familiarisation flight he came under friendly fire from anti-aircraft guns on Kiriwina Island, but avoided serious injury. He was raised to temporary group captain in December, and assumed command of No. 71 Wing the following month. The Beauforts of No. 6 Squadron and No. 71 Wing took part in a series of major attacks on Rabaul, bombing and strafing airfields, infrastructure and shipping; this continued until February 1944, when the Japanese withdrew their aircraft from Rabaul. The same month, Hannah fell ill and had to be repatriated to Australia. After six weeks recuperation at Laverton, he returned to No. 6 Squadron, based on Goodenough Island. From March to August, the squadron was mainly involved in convoy escort and anti-submarine duties. In September 1944, Hannah was appointed senior air staff officer (SASO) at Headquarters Western Area Command, Perth. He took over control of the formation from Air Commodore Raymond Brownell in July 1945, following Brownell's departure to command No. 11 Group in the Dutch East Indies.

== Post-war RAAF career ==
=== Rise to Chief of the Air staff ===
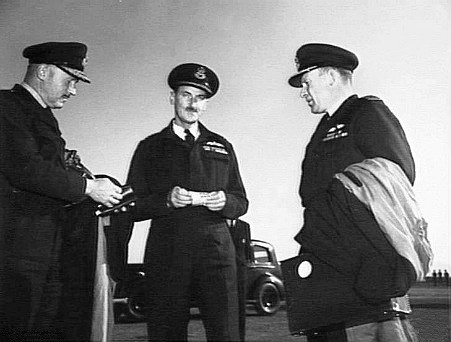
Group Captain Hannah (right) with Air Vice Marshal V.E. Hancock (left) and Group Captain A.G. Carr, commanding No. 91 Wing RAAF, Japan, October 1952

Hannah handed over command of Western Area in October 1946, and was posted to Britain. For the next two years, he undertook study at RAF Staff College, Andover, and served as SASO at RAAF Overseas Headquarters in London. Returning to Australia, in May 1949 he assumed command of RAAF Station Amberley, Queensland. From August 1950, he also held temporary command of the base's Avro Lincoln heavy bomber formation, No. 82 Wing. Promoted to substantive group captain in October 1950, Hannah was appointed an Officer of the Order of the British Empire (OBE) in the 1951 New Year Honours, in particular for his "exceptional ability" as SASO at RAAF Overseas Headquarters. In September, he was made Director of Personnel Services; his position became Director-General of Personnel in July 1952. As aide-de-camp to Queen Elizabeth II, Hannah was heavily involved in planning the RAAF's part in the 1954 Royal Tour of Australia. He was raised to Commander of the Order of the British Empire (CBE) in the Queen's Birthday Honours that June.

In 1955, Hannah attended the Imperial Defence College in London, and was promoted to air commodore. He was posted to Singapore as SASO, RAF Far East Air Force Headquarters, in January 1956, handling counter-insurgency operations during the Malayan Emergency. Hannah's "distinguished service" during the conflict was recognised with his appointment as a Companion of the Order of the Bath (CB) in June 1959. As Director-General of Plans and Policy from March 1959, he was responsible for commencing the Department of Air's relocation from Melbourne to Canberra. In December 1961, Hannah was appointed Deputy Chief of the Air Staff, receiving promotion to acting air vice marshal in May 1962; the rank was made substantive in January 1963. He was later described by his staff officer in this role as "brusque" and "impersonal" though not unsympathetic, his "uncommunicative" manner stemming from a preference to "do his own research, think out the substance of his project submissions, dictate to his stenographer, then amend to his own satisfaction", rather than delegate. Hannah served as Air Officer Commanding (AOC) Operational Command (now Air Command) from February 1965 to December 1967, during which time the RAAF's fighter squadrons completed their conversion from the CAC Sabre to the supersonic Dassault Mirage III. His tenure also saw the deployment of the first Australian helicopters to Vietnam, eight UH-1 Iroquois of No. 9 Squadron that departed Sydney in May 1966. Hannah's next appointment was as AOC Support Command, responsible for training and maintenance in the Air Force. Throughout his career to this point he was noted for his energy and drive.

=== Chief of the Air staff ===
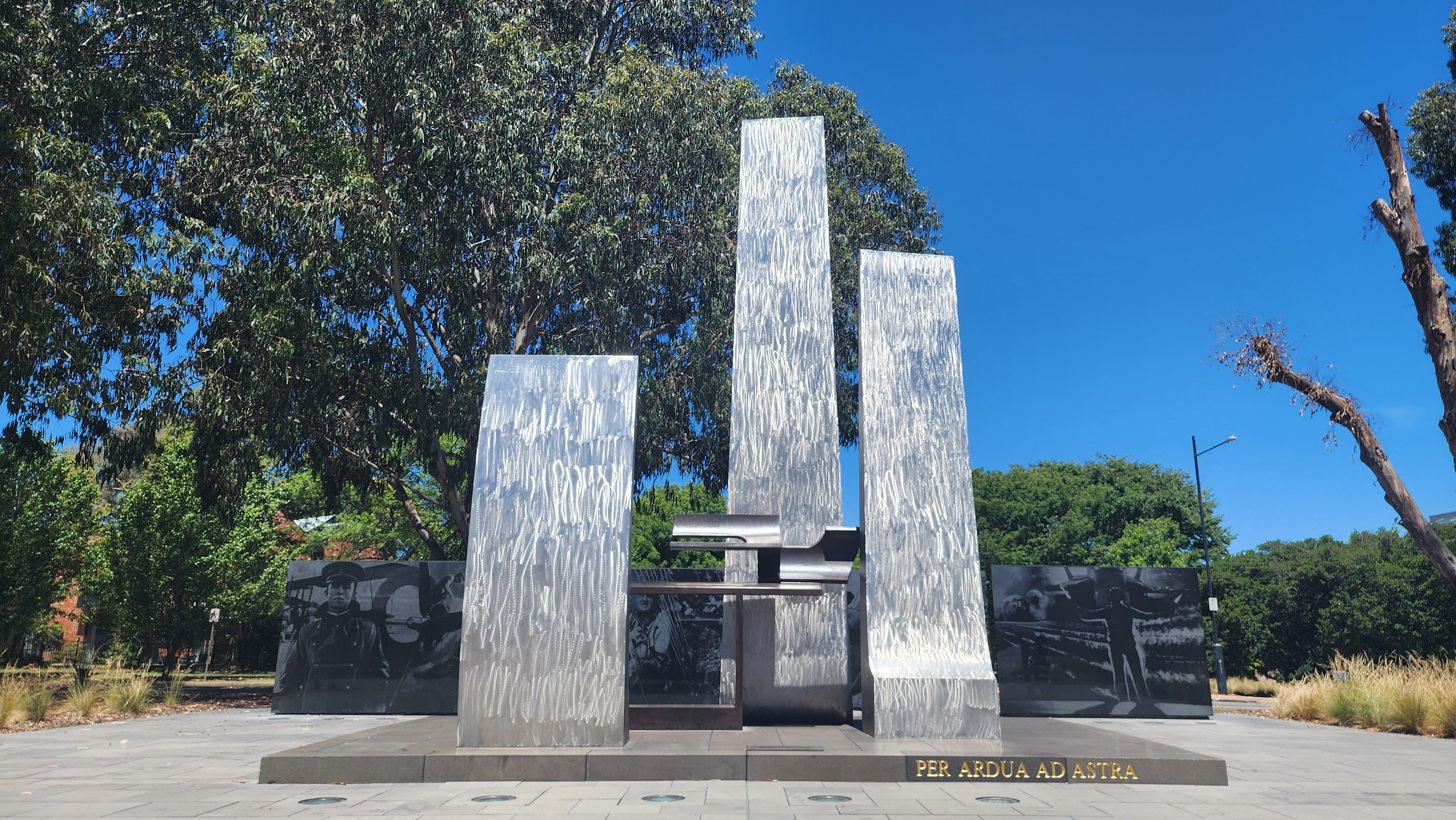
RAAF Memorial in Canberra. Air Marshal Hannah was on the committee that approved the monument as unveiled in 1973; the rear panels date from 2002.

Hannah was promoted to air marshal on 1 January 1970, and succeeded Air Marshal Sir Alister Murdoch as Chief of the Air Staff. Murdoch had earlier recommended Hannah, known to be a strong advocate for Australian participation in the Vietnam War, for the position of Commander Australian Forces Vietnam when it came up for rotation at the end of 1969; the post went to an Army officer, and the Federal government ordered the withdrawal of the RAAF presence in Vietnam during Hannah's tour as CAS. In March 1970, the Minister for Defence, Malcolm Fraser, commissioned a review of naval air power. Hannah fundamentally disagreed with any suggestion that the Royal Australian Navy should operate land-based aircraft, claiming that he was arguing not from a partisan perspective but to ensure that Australia's limited defence resources were not spread across three services. Confidential RAAF papers from the time declared that its goal was always to "avoid giving the Navy the opportunity to establish a land-based air force". Two years later, Hannah responded favourably to a recommendation from the Chairman of the Chiefs of Staff Committee, Admiral Sir Victor Smith, to use the soon-to-be-delivered F-111 bomber for maritime support, among other roles.

In the 1971 New Year Honours, Hannah was raised to Knight Commander of the Order of the British Empire (KBE). His tour as CAS coincided with the RAAF's Golden Jubilee, celebrated in March and April that year. He personally organised a fly-past of two US Air Force F-111s at air shows marking the occasion, generating favourable coverage to counteract the poor publicity surrounding the type's long-delayed entry into Australian service. He was also involved in two controversial decisions the same year. Firstly, he was a member of the committee to choose an Air Force memorial to be located on Anzac Parade, Canberra. The selected design was an abstract sculpture that, according to official RAAF historian Alan Stephens, reflected "the selection panel's comprehensive failure to understand the nature of air force service". Secondly, Hannah commissioned a replacement for the Air Force's winter uniform, traditionally a shade "somewhere between royal and navy blue" that had been personally chosen by the RAAF's first CAS, Wing Commander (later Air Marshal Sir) Richard Williams, to distinguish it from the lighter Royal Air Force colour. Hannah publicly debuted the uniform that he approved, an all-purpose middle-blue suit, at a Point Cook graduation parade on 8 December 1971. It was the object of much adverse comment in the ensuing years; personnel complained of being mistaken for bus, train and postal employees. One of Hannah's successors as CAS, Air Marshal Errol McCormack, ordered that the uniform revert to the original colour and style chosen by Williams, commencing in 2000.

== Governor ==
Viceregal styles of Sir Colin Hannah
- Reference style: His Excellency
- Spoken style: Your Excellency

Hannah's planned three-year term as Chief of the Air Staff was cut short by some ten months when he accepted an offer to serve as Governor of Queensland, becoming the first officer in the RAAF to receive a vice-regal appointment. The announcement was made in January 1972, and he took office on 21 March. He succeeded Sir Alan Mansfield. Hannah did not have a strong connection with Queensland at the time of his appointment, and had only lived in the state during his period as commander of RAAF Station Amberley between 1949 and 1951. He claimed not to have actively sought the governorship, and was criticised for failing to consult with senior colleagues before making his decision to retire early from his position as head of the Air Force. He was replaced as CAS by his deputy, Air Vice Marshal (later Air Marshal Sir) Charles Read.

Described when he took office as "a man with the flexibility of mind and ability to mix with people, so necessary for a Governor", Hannah was appointed a Knight Commander of the Order of St Michael and St George (KCMG) and a Knight and Deputy Prior of the Venerable Order of Saint John in September 1972. His term as Governor was relatively uneventful until 1975. In October that year, he created controversy at a Brisbane Chamber of Commerce luncheon by criticising the "fumbling ineptitude" of Prime Minister Gough Whitlam's Federal Labor government for placing Australia in "its present economic state". Vice-regal appointees in Australia are expected to remain neutral and above politics but Hannah declared that he would be "guilty of sheltering behind convention, of denying my heritage and failing in my regard for the people of Queensland" if he did not speak his mind. The incident occurred in the midst of a constitutional crisis and, according to military historian Chris Coulthard-Clark, was "widely seen as a blatant intervention in the national political arena". The Federal government responded by advising the Queen to revoke Hannah's dormant commission to serve in place of the Governor-General if required; at the time Hannah was the second in line to serve as Governor-General, after the Governor of New South Wales.

Commenting on the episode twenty years later, former Governor-General Bill Hayden, himself from Queensland, spoke of "Whitlam's peremptory and justifiable dismissal of Queensland Governor Sir Colin Hannah". Hayden observed that, "Hannah's transgression was not so much that he suffered from an excessive notion of his own importance, which he did, but rather in the intemperate manner he assailed the national government at a public function in Brisbane. In doing that he soared dangerously above his natural level of pomposity." Following his succession in November 1975, Liberal Prime Minister Malcolm Fraser attempted to have the dormant commission reinstated, but the Queen – following advice from the British government that cited Hannah's lack of impartiality – refused her assent. When Queensland Premier Joh Bjelke-Petersen sought to extend the Governor's term, the British government again declined. Bjelke-Petersen sought to pursue the matter further, but Hannah declined to let his name be put forward again.

On 9 October 1976, Hannah dedicated a memorial at Cairns to commemorate the crews of RAAF Catalina flying boats who lost their lives in the South West Pacific during World War II. His vice-regal appointment lapsed on 20 March 1977, and he was succeeded the next month by Commodore Sir James Ramsay.

== Retirement and death ==
Hannah retired following completion of his term as Governor of Queensland. He was appointed a Knight Commander of the Royal Victorian Order (KCVO) in August 1977 (backdated to March) as part of Queen Elizabeth II's Silver Jubilee visit to Australia. Hannah died of a heart attack on 22 May 1978 at his home in Surfers Paradise, Queensland. He was given a state funeral and cremated; his wife and daughter survived him. Hannah Community Park, straddling the suburbs of Fadden and Gowrie in Canberra, was established in his honour in 2002.

== Notes ==
Military offices
Preceded by Air Vice Marshal Alister Murdoch	Air Officer Commanding Operational Command; 1965–67	Succeeded by Air Vice Marshal Keith Hennock
Preceded by Air Marshal Sir Alister Murdoch	Chief of the Air Staff; 1970–72	Succeeded by Air Marshal Sir Charles Read
Government offices
Preceded by Sir Alan Mansfield	Governor of Queensland; 1972–77	Succeeded by Sir James Ramsay
