= Raymond Brownell =

Australian air force officer (1894–1974)

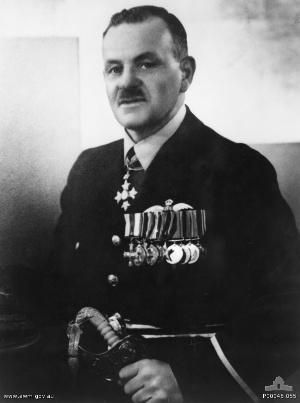
- Air Commodore Raymond J. Brownell, c. 1945
- Born: 17 May 1894; New Town, Tasmania
- Died: 12 April 1974 (aged 79); Subiaco, Western Australia
- Military career
- Allegiance: Australia; United Kingdom
- Branch: First Australian Imperial Force; Royal Flying Corps; Royal Australian Air Force
- Service years: 1912–1919; 1921–1947
- Rank: Air commodore
- Nickname: "Brownie"
- Commands: No. 11 Group (1945–46); Western Area (1943–45); No. 1 Training Group (1941–42); RAF Sembawang (1940–41); RAAF Base Pearce (1938–40); No. 23 (City of Perth) Squadron (1938–40); No. 1 Squadron (1926–28)
- Conflicts: First World War; Gallipoli campaign; Western Front; Battle of the Somme; Battle of Pozières; Italian Front; Second World War; South-East Asian theatre; South West Pacific theatre; New Guinea campaign
- Awards: Commander of the Order of the British Empire; Military Cross; Military Medal

Air Commodore Raymond James Brownell, CBE, MC, MM (17 May 1894 – 12 April 1974) was a senior officer in the Royal Australian Air Force (RAAF) and a First World War flying ace. Born in Hobart, Tasmania, Brownell was working as a clerk with a firm of accountants when he enlisted in the Australian Imperial Force on the outbreak of the First World War. He served during the Gallipoli campaign before transferring to the Western Front. Awarded the Military Medal for his actions during the Battle of Pozières, he was accepted for a transfer to the Royal Flying Corps in 1917. After flight training in the United Kingdom, Brownell was commissioned as a second lieutenant and posted for operational service over the Western Front in September 1917. Moving with his squadron to Italy, he was awarded the Military Cross and credited with shooting down 12 aircraft by war's end. Taking his discharge in 1919, Brownell returned to Australia.

Commissioned in the RAAF in 1921, Brownell had risen to the rank of group captain by the beginning of the Second World War. Establishing the RAAF base in Singapore, he returned to Australia in 1941 as an air commodore and was appointed to lead No. 1 Training Group. He was Air Officer Commanding Western Area from January 1943 until July 1945, when he took charge of the recently formed No. 11 Group on Morotai. Retiring from the Air Force in 1947, Brownell assumed a partnership in a stockbroking firm. He died in 1974 aged 79; his autobiography, From Khaki to Blue, was published posthumously.

== Early life ==
Brownell was born in the Hobart suburb of New Town, Tasmania, on 17 May 1894 to William Percival Brownell, a draper, and his wife Julie Ann James (née Scott). Initially educated at Leslie House School, Brownell later attended Scotch College, Melbourne, where he was an active sportsman. On graduation, he was apprenticed to a firm of public accountants and auditors in Hobart. In 1912, Brownell enlisted in the Citizens Military Force and was posted to the 41st Battery, Australian Field Artillery.

== First World War ==
=== Australian Imperial Force ===
On 12 September 1914, Brownell transferred to the Australian Imperial Force for service during the First World War. Allotted to the 9th Battery, 3rd Field Artillery Brigade with the rank of gunner, Brownell embarked from Hobart aboard HMAT Geelong on 20 October, bound for Egypt. On arrival, the unit spent several months training in the desert, before it was posted for service during the Gallipoli Campaign. Instead of landing on the peninsula with the battery, Brownell was transferred to Alexandria where the Army required his administrative abilities as an accountant.

During July 1915, Brownell was shipped to Gallipoli and rejoined the 9th Battery. Promoted to bombardier on 12 November, he was in one of the final Australian waves to be evacuated from the peninsula in December during the Allied withdrawal. Returning to Egypt, he was advanced to provisional sergeant on 24 February 1916. Embarking with his unit from Alexandria, Brownell arrived in France for service on the Western Front on 29 March, following a six-day voyage.

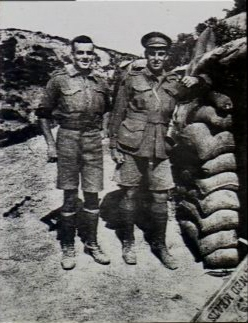
Raymond Brownell with his brother Captain Herbert Brownell standing outside a dugout on Gallipoli

On 21–22 July 1916, Brownell was in action with his battery at Pozières, during which the unit was subject to severe German shellfire. Throughout the engagement, Brownell established and maintained communications between the battery and firing line, despite fatigue or personal risk to himself. Commended for his "particularly meritorious service ... and ... gallantry in this work", Brownell was subsequently recommended for the Military Medal. The notification for the award was published in a supplement to The London Gazette on 16 November 1916.

=== Royal Flying Corps ===
In October 1916, Brownell applied for a transfer to the Royal Flying Corps. One of 5,000 applicants, Brownell was accepted on 1 January 1917 along with a further 200 Australians. Posted for pilot training, he proceeded to England and was posted to No. 3 School of Military Aeronautics at Exeter College, Oxford, from 26 January. On graduating from the course, Brownell was discharged from the Australian Imperial Force on 16 March and commissioned as a second lieutenant in the Royal Flying Corps the following day.

Allotted to No. 45 Squadron RFC flying Sopwith Camels, Brownell moved to France for operational service over the Western Front during September 1917. On 10 September, he took part in his first patrol, during which he shot down a two-seater German aircraft. In his time flying over the Western Front, Brownell accumulated a total of five victories and achieved 'ace' status before his squadron was transferred to Italy in December. Later that month, Brownell and his observer, Lieutenant Henry Moody, shot down German ace Alwin Thurm over Asolo.

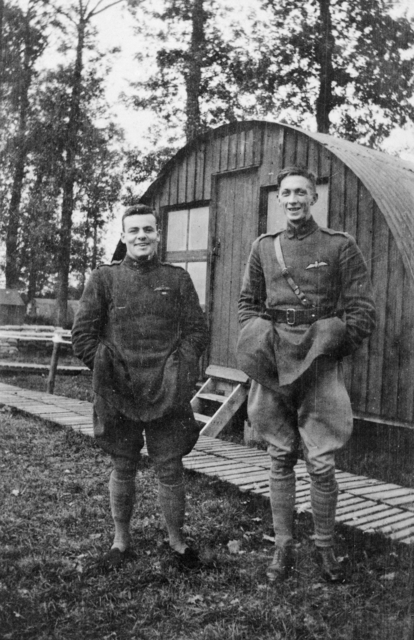
Brownell (left) with fellow Australian flying ace Cedric Howell outside a hut at an airfield in France, c. 1917

Appointed a flight commander in No. 45 Squadron, Brownell was promoted to temporary captain on 11 February 1918. During aerial engagements against Central aircraft over the Italian front, he was accredited with the destruction of a further seven aircraft, bringing his total to 12 plus nine probables. Brownell's aerial victories were composed of five aircraft and one shared destroyed, two and one shared out of control, one shared captured, and one balloon. For his success in bringing six of these aircraft down over a three-month period, Brownell was awarded the Military Cross. The announcement of the decoration was published in a supplement of The London Gazette on 4 March 1918, with the citation for the award being published in a later issue on 16 August 1918, reading:

War Office, 16th August, 1918.

With reference to the awards conferred as announced in the London Gazette dated 4th March, 1918, the following are the statements of service for which the decorations were conferred:—

Awarded the Military Cross.

2nd Lt. Raymond James Brownell, M.M., R.F.C., Spec. Res.

For conspicuous gallantry and devotion to duty. Within the last three months he has brought down six enemy aeroplanes, four of which were seen to come down in flames, the other two falling completely out of control. The dash, gallantry and offensive spirit displayed on all occasions by this officer are worthy of the highest praise.

In April 1918, Brownell was granted compassionate leave to visit his seriously ill mother. Leaving No. 45 Squadron, he travelled to Tasmania. At the end of his leave in September, he commenced his return journey to the United Kingdom. During the voyage, he became grievously ill with pneumonic influenza. On arrival, Brownell accepted a commission in the newly formed Royal Air Force (RAF). Brownell's mother again suffered a deterioration in health, so he sought to resign from the RAF and was placed on the unemployed list on 14 August 1919. Embarking for Tasmania, he arrived during September.

== Inter-war years ==
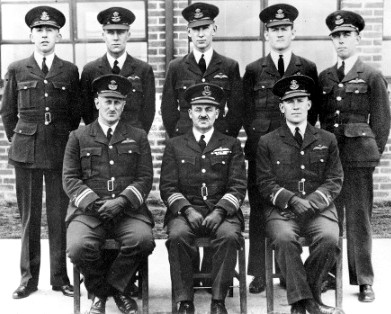
Officers of RAAF Base Pearce in 1938. Brownell, Commanding Officer of the base, is located centre, front row.

On his return to Australia, Brownell was employed as a sub-accountant for a firm of merchants in Melbourne, and later with the Hobart City Council as a clerk. On 22 April 1920, Brownell acted as one of the pallbearers at the military funeral of his friend and fellow No. 45 Squadron officer, Captain Cedric Howell, who had been killed in an aeroplane crash while participating in the England to Australia air race. Once the Royal Australian Air Force (RAAF) was formed, Brownell was commissioned as a flying officer on 12 September 1921 and posted to RAAF Point Cook in Victoria, training Air Force cadets. In a ceremony at St Andrew's Presbyterian Church, Hobart, on 26 August 1925, Brownell married Rhyllis Jean Birchall; the couple would later have two daughters. The following year, Brownell assumed command of No. 1 Squadron. He led the squadron until 1928, when he was appointed to the RAAF Headquarters in Melbourne as director of Personnel Services.

During 1934, Brownell was posted to England for exchange service with the RAF. Made second-in-command of No. 3 Flying Training School at Grantham, he was promoted to wing commander on 1 April 1936. While still serving in the United Kingdom, Brownell was appointed commanding officer of No. 23 (City of Perth) Squadron (later No. 25 Squadron), which had been formed earlier in 1937. The squadron moved to RAAF Base Pearce in Western Australia during March 1938, at which time Brownell returned to Australia and assumed command of the unit along with the base. Brownell was the first Commanding Officer of Pearce, which was not only the first RAAF establishment to be located in Western Australia, but also the first permanent air force unit to be established in the state.

== Second World War ==
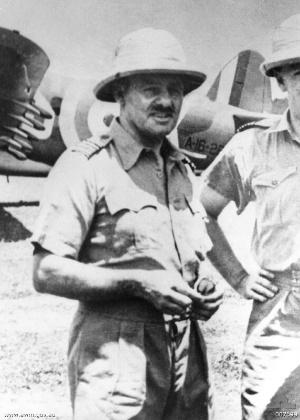
Group Captain Brownell in Malaya, c. 1941

On the outbreak of the Second World War, more units were placed under Brownell's purview at RAAF Base Pearce and he was consequently promoted to temporary group captain in December 1939. With the introduction of Lockheed Hudson aircraft to the RAAF in February 1940, several units were re-equipped, including No. 14 Squadron at RAAF Base Pearce. The Hudsons replaced the squadron's Avro Ansons, which were to be ferried back to the eastern coast of Australia to be used as training aircraft. On one occasion, Brownell took part in ferrying an Anson to RAAF Point Cook with No. 14 Squadron pilot Charles Learmonth. Arriving with the aircraft, the pair piloted a de Havilland Moth Minor—a two-seated, open-cockpit, monoplane—back to Pearce. The return journey took Brownell and Learmonth seven days to complete, and involved a total of twenty-one refuelling stops along the way.

In August 1940, Brownell was ordered to Singapore to establish and command an RAAF station on the island, as well as administer the RAAF squadrons located in Malaya. Embarking aboard the SS Strathallan in mid-August, Brownell and his staff formed the RAAF station within two weeks of arrival at Sembawang. Under the control of RAF Far East Command, the station was established as RAF Sembawang. During this time, Brownell frequently visited the Malaya peninsula.

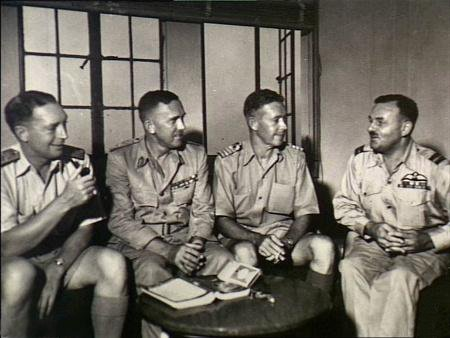
Members of the Australian Mission Group at the Japanese surrender talks. Left to right: Commodore John Collins; Lieutenant General Frank Berryman; Captain Roy Dowling; Air Commodore Raymond Brownell

Promoted to acting air commodore, Brownell returned to Australia in August 1941 and was appointed Air Officer Commanding No. 1 Training Group in Melbourne. In this position, Brownell commanded approximately thirty establishments located in southern Australia. On 1 January 1943, he was posted as Air Officer Commanding Western Area. Based at RAAF Base Pearce, Brownell's responsibilities involved coordinating training and directing long-range bombing operations. Following intelligence reports that a Japanese force was en route to raid Western Australia, the Australian Government ordered a build-up of the defences in the area. In response to this, Brownell organised air defences around Perth and the Exmouth Gulf during March 1944. With the use of Army transports, he also reinforced Cunderdin with supplies and bombs for the use of the heavy bombers in the area. The Japanese attack did not occur. For his service as Air Officer Commanding Western Area, Brownell was appointed a Commander of the Order of the British Empire (CBE) in the 1945 New Years Honours.

Relinquishing command of Western Area in July 1945, Brownell was appointed commander of the recently formed No. 11 Group. No. 11 Group was established as a static organisation that was to take administrative control of all RAAF units based on Morotai. The group assumed its role on 30 July, and had the initial jurisdiction of all Dutch territory in the area, along with British North Borneo and Sarawak. It also held the three main responsibilities of local air defence and sea lane protection, support of adjacent formations and offensive operations against Japanese targets within range, and line-of-communication duties. The group was formed too late to assume all of its responsibilities before the Second World War drew to an end. Brownell was present at the Japanese surrenders in Manila, Tokyo, and on Morotai. He was selected by the Australian government to attend the ceremony aboard the USS Missouri on 2 September 1945, but was replaced by the Chief of the Air Staff, Air Vice Marshal George Jones, when Jones became available to make the trip to Japan.

== Later life ==
Returning to Western Australia after the war, Brownell attended an investiture ceremony at Government House, Perth, on 3 January 1947, where he was presented with his CBE by the Lieutenant-Governor of Western Australia. On 24 March that year, Brownell retired from the RAAF on medical grounds. He had in any case been slated for early retirement, along with other senior officers and veterans of the First World War, to make way for the advancement of younger and equally capable officers.

Following his retirement from the Air Force, Brownell was made a partner of S. G. Brearley & Co., a stockbroking firm located in Perth. In 1951, he became chairman of the associated sporting committee of the National Fitness Council of Western Australia; he served in this role until 1967. Aged 79, Brownell died at Subiaco, Western Australia, on 12 April 1974 and was accorded a funeral with full Air Force honours. Brownell's autobiography, From Khaki to Blue, was posthumously published by the Military Historical Society of Australia in 1978.

== Notes ==
Military offices
Preceded by Air Commodore Hippolyte De La Rue	Air Officer Commanding Western Area; 1943–1945	Succeeded by Group Captain Colin Hannah
New command	Commanding Officer RAF Sembawang; 1940–1941	Succeeded by Group Captain John McCauley
