= De Le Rue =

De Le Rue is a French surname. Notable people with the surname include:

- Georges Delerue (1925–1992), French composer
- Henri Delerue (1939–2016), French racewalker
- Xavier de Le Rue (born 1979), French snowboarder
- Paul-Henri de Le Rue (born 1984), French snowboarder

== See also ==
- Delerue
- De la Rue (surname)
