= De la Rúa =

de la Rúa is a surname. Notable people with the name include:

- Antonio de la Rúa (born 1974), Argentine lawyer
- Fernando de la Rúa (1937–2019), Argentine president
- Jorge de la Rúa (1942–2015), Argentine government official

== See also ==
- De la Rue (surname)
