= Hippolyte De La Rue =

Royal Australian Air Force senior commander (1891–1977)

Hippolyte Ferdinand (Frank) De La Rue
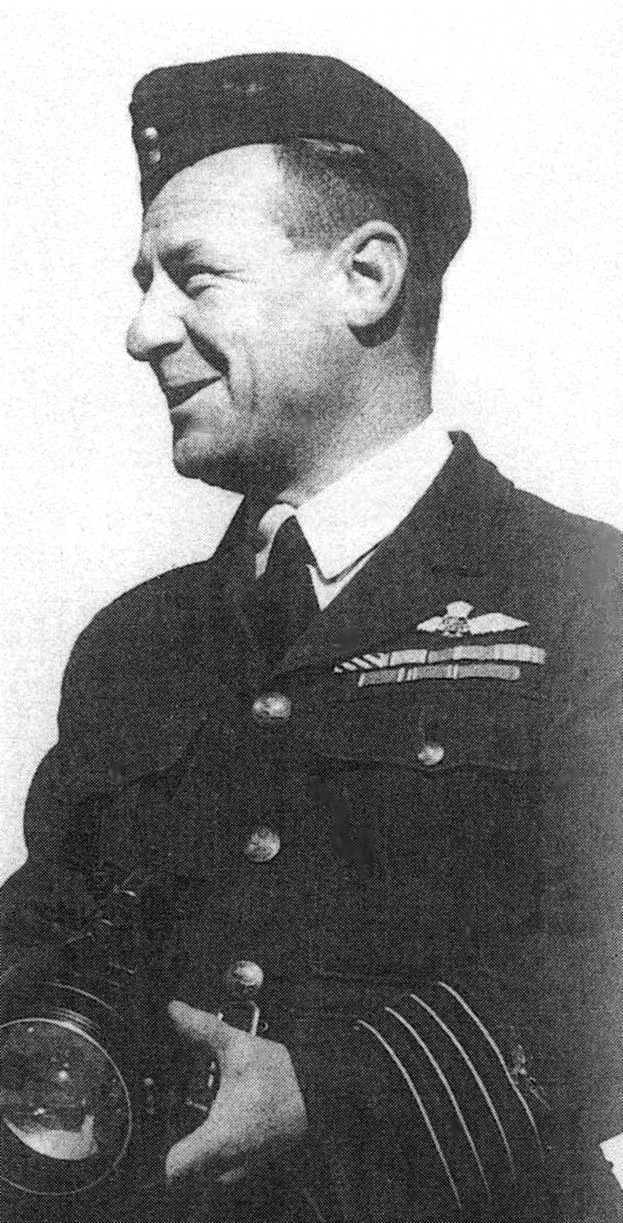
- Group Captain De La Rue, 1939
- Born: 13 March 1891; Auburn, New South Wales
- Died: 18 May 1977 (aged 86); Kew, Victoria
- Military career
- Allegiance: Australia
- Branch: Royal Australian Air Force
- Service years: 1908–46
- Rank: Air Commodore
- Nickname: "Kanga"
- Commands: No. 223 Squadron RAF (1918–19); No. 270 Squadron RAF (1919); Seaplane Squadron (1931–33); No. 1 FTS (1933–37); RAAF Station Richmond (1938–40); Western Area Command (1941–43)
- Conflicts: World War I; European theatre; Gallipoli campaign; World War II
- Awards: Commander of the Order of the British Empire; Distinguished Flying Cross; Silver Medal of Military Valor (Italy)

Air Commodore Hippolyte Ferdinand (Frank) De La Rue, CBE, DFC (13 March 1891 – 18 May 1977) was a senior commander in the Royal Australian Air Force (RAAF). Joining the Mercantile Marine as a youth, he became a pilot in Britain's Royal Naval Air Service during World War I. In 1918, he was given command of No. 223 Squadron in the newly formed Royal Air Force. The following year he took charge of No. 270 Squadron RAF in Egypt. Returning to Australia, De La Rue joined the short-lived Australian Air Corps in 1920, and became a founding member of the RAAF in March 1921. Specialising in maritime aviation, he led seaplane formations based at Point Cook, Victoria, during the 1920s and early 1930s.

De La Rue was appointed commanding officer of No. 1 Flying Training School at Point Cook in 1933. He was promoted to group captain in 1937 and took command of RAAF Station Richmond, New South Wales, the following year. At the outbreak of World War II, De La Rue was slated to lead an air expeditionary force to Great Britain, but this plan was abandoned after Australia committed itself to the Empire Air Training Scheme. Promoted to temporary air commodore, he served as Air Officer Commanding Western Area from 1941 to 1943, and finished the war as Inspector of Administration at RAAF Headquarters, Melbourne. Nicknamed "Kanga", De La Rue retired from the Air Force in 1946, and died in 1977 at the age of eighty-six.

== Early life and World War I ==
Born on 13 March 1891 in Auburn, a suburb of Sydney, De La Rue was the son of jeweller Edmond Emile De La Rue and his wife Ellen. Following a "limited" education, he joined the Merchant Navy in 1908, becoming a second officer by 1914. De La Rue transferred to the Royal Navy's Transport Service shortly after the outbreak of World War I, operating on troop ships between England and France. He saw service at Gallipoli as navigator on Huntsgreen, from the Allied landings on 25 April 1915 until the withdrawal in December. In July 1916, he transferred once again, to the Royal Naval Air Service (RNAS) as a temporary flight sub-lieutenant, and was awarded his wings in November.

Training as a seaplane pilot in Hampshire, De La Rue was posted to Wales in February 1917. Later that year, he claimed an unconfirmed sinking of a German submarine while on coastal patrol. Promoted flight lieutenant in January 1918, De La Rue became an honorary captain in the Royal Air Force (RAF) that April, following the merger of the RNAS and the Royal Flying Corps. He was posted to No. 223 Squadron in Otranto, Italy, later taking command of the unit. While piloting a Short seaplane escorting Allied bombers on a raid against the port city of Durrës, Albania, he rescued the crew of another seaplane that had been forced down in the Austrian-held harbour. He was awarded the Distinguished Flying Cross for his actions, as well as the Italian Silver Medal of Military Valor.

== Between the wars ==
De La Rue was posted to Alexandria, Egypt, in January 1919 to command No. 270 (Seaplane) Squadron. Offered a permanent commission in the RAF that August, he nevertheless returned to Australia and sought employment through Lieutenant Colonel Stanley Goble, an ex-RNAS pilot then seconded to the Navy Office. Goble, desiring a specialist seaplane pilot for naval cooperation work, arranged a captain's commission in the recently established Australian Air Corps, successor to the wartime Australian Flying Corps. On 17 June 1920, in an Airco DH.9A, De La Rue accompanied Captain Adrian Cole on a flight to an altitude of 27,000 feet (8,200 m), setting an Australian record that stood for more than ten years. Later that month, flying an Avro 504L floatplane, he became the first person to land an aircraft on the Yarra River in Victoria. In July he was put in charge of trials of the Avro 504L aboard the Royal Australian Navy's flagship, HMAS Australia. De La Rue joined the Royal Australian Air Force (RAAF) as a flight lieutenant in 1921, becoming one of the original twenty-one officers on its strength when it was formed (as the Australian Air Force) that March. Going by the first name of Frank, he was also popularly known throughout the service as "Kanga". In August 1921, he underwent the RAAF's "No. 1 Course" at the Australian Army's Central Training Depot in Holsworthy, New South Wales; his fellow inductees included Flying Officers George Jones, Arthur Murphy, and Raymond Brownell.

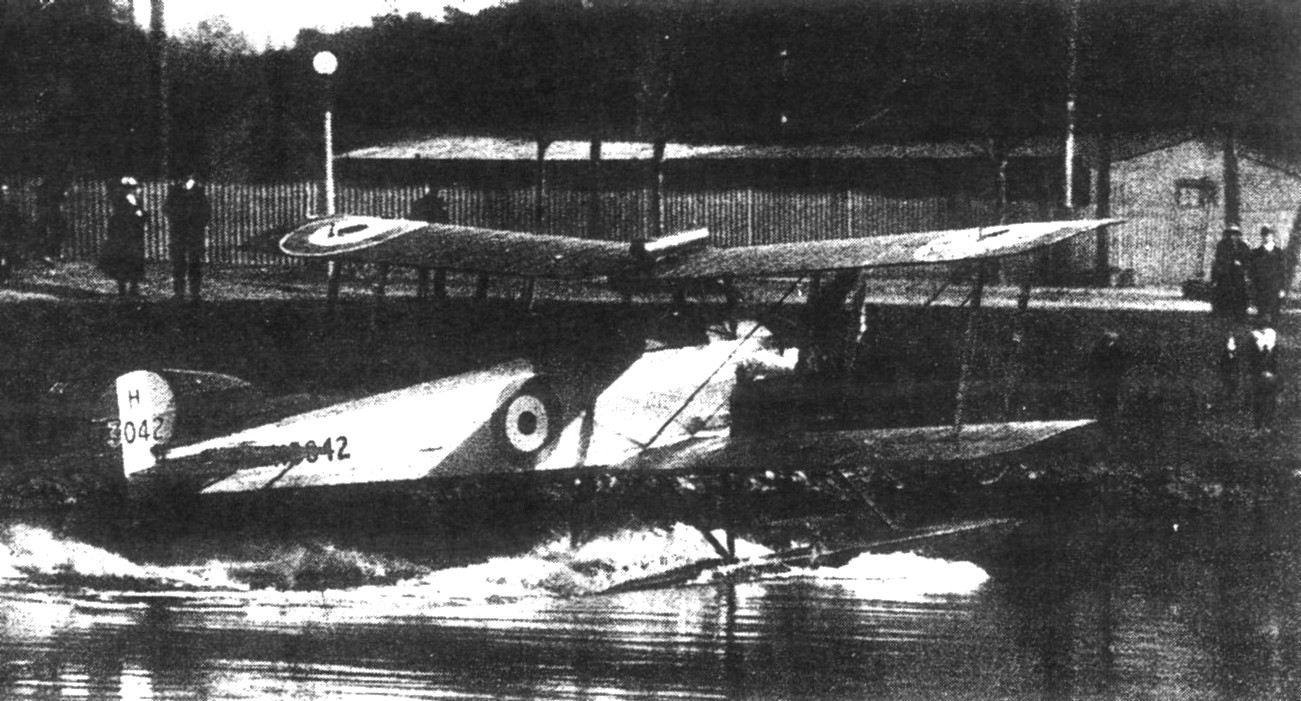
In an Avro 504L, Flight Lieutenant De La Rue makes the first seaplane landing on the Yarra River, Victoria, June 1920

During the 1920s, De La Rue held a series of postings at RAAF Point Cook, Victoria, and at Air Force Headquarters, Melbourne. In May 1922, then in charge of the Seaplane Flight, he crashed an Avro 504L into Port Phillip; his rescuers claimed that his main concern following the mishap was the state of the corduroy trousers he was wearing. He lost the RAAF's sole Bristol Scout in another accident less than a year later. De La Rue married Clara Stone in a Presbyterian ceremony at Scots Church, Melbourne, on 1 October 1923; the couple would have a daughter. He had another escape in August 1925 when he crashed a Sopwith Pup into a hangar; a witness said that De La Rue, who was "renowned for his fiery Gallic temper", strode from the wreckage and began to violently abuse the aircraft.

By 1926, De La Rue was the examining officer on the flight instructors course at No. 1 Flying Training School (No. 1 FTS), Point Cook. On exchange in Britain during 1929–30, De La Rue underwent familiarisation with aircraft carriers, and served on the staff of No. 201 (Flying Boat) Squadron, based on the south coast of England. Upon his return to Australia in 1931, he was given command of the RAAF's Seaplane Squadron at Point Cook. Promoted wing commander in December 1932, De La Rue led No. 1 FTS from early 1933. He was promoted group captain in January 1937, and took over as commanding officer (CO) of Headquarters RAAF Station Richmond, New South Wales, from Group Captain Cole in January the following year.

== World War II ==
De La Rue and his staff at Headquarters Richmond worked "flat out" in the days prior to the outbreak of World War II to get the base to a fit state of readiness and, immediately after hostilities were declared on 3 September, to liaise with the Central War Room in Melbourne passing instructions to squadrons. The following day, Richmond's first wartime sortie took place, a flight of three Avro Ansons and three Supermarine Seagulls patrolling the ocean off Sydney. Within a month the Chief of the Air Staff (CAS), Air Vice Marshal Goble, proposed despatching a six-squadron air expeditionary force to Great Britain, with De La Rue, then the RAAF's seventh most senior officer, in charge. Air Marshal Richard Williams, Goble's long-time rival for leadership of the Air Force in the 1920s and '30s, later contended that the CAS was unduly favouring his fellow RNAS veteran and seaplane specialist to lead what would have been the RAAF's largest formation to date, particularly considering that other contenders for the role such as Group Captains Cole, Frank McNamara, and Henry Wrigley had greater landplane experience than De La Rue. The concept was in any case abandoned soon after, as Australia concentrated on participation in the Empire Air Training Scheme. Sometime in the latter half of 1940, De La Rue was seeing dinner guests off the base at RAAF Richmond and attempted to re-enter the perimeter via the main gate. Wearing civilian clothes and without his security pass, he was challenged and then locked up by the guards, who did not recognise him or believe his assurances that he was their commander. De La Rue was finally released by the orderly officer but was still fuming the next morning; only the advice of the base warrant officer (disciplinary), who had congratulated the guards on their diligence, prevented the CO from taking action against all concerned.

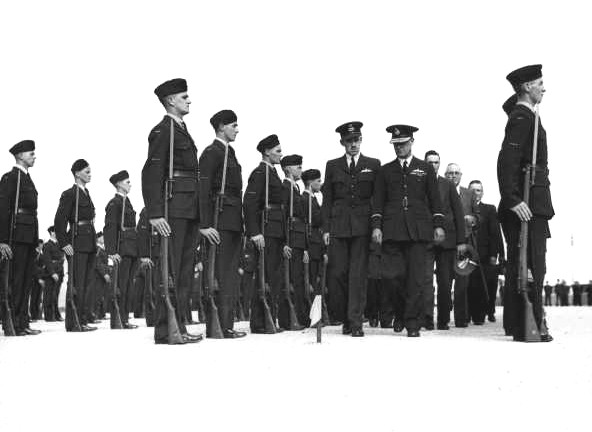
Air Commodore De La Rue (in braided cap) inspecting RAAF flying school trainees, c. 1941

After completing his tenure at Richmond, De La Rue briefly took the role of senior air staff officer (SASO) at Central Area Command in October 1940. The following month, his name was put forward to establish an RAAF depot in London to look after the interests of the many thousands of Australian airmen disembarking there, but financial considerations led to the plan being scuppered temporarily. In fact, RAAF Overseas Headquarters would be formed on 1 December 1941, with Air Marshal Williams appointed Air Officer Commanding (AOC). Meanwhile, De La Rue also missed out on a potential posting to the Middle East that was suggested by the British but turned down by the Australian government. Promoted acting air commodore, he became the inaugural AOC Western Area, headquartered in Perth, on 9 January 1941. Among the units he controlled in this position were No. 14 (General Reconnaissance) Squadron, No. 25 (General Purpose) Squadron, No. 35 (Transport) Squadron, and No. 77 (Fighter) Squadron. De La Rue worked assiduously to prepare the latter for operations, as it was the only fighter squadron able to defend Perth and Fremantle. He also lobbied RAAF Headquarters for a force of long-range PBY Catalina flying boats to augment the Lockheed Hudsons of No. 14 Squadron, but none were offered to him.

De La Rue was made a temporary air commodore in July 1941. By February 1942, he was the eighth most senior officer in the RAAF. Handing over Western Area Command to Air Commodore Ray Brownell in January 1943, De La Rue became Inspector of Administration at RAAF Headquarters, in which post he saw out the rest of the war. On 8 June 1944, he was appointed a Commander of the Order of the British Empire.

== Later life ==
De La Rue was summarily retired from the RAAF after the war, along with a number of other senior commanders and veterans of World War I, partly to make way for the advancement of younger and equally capable officers, and also due to his suspect health. In recommending early retirement, the CAS, Air Vice Marshal George Jones, noted that De La Rue possessed "fairly good Service knowledge" and was of strong character, but that "sometimes his efforts [were] ill-directed". De La Rue was, furthermore, above the statutory retiring age for his substantive rank of group captain. He was officially discharged on 1 April 1946. An honorary air commodore from 1956, his chief hobby in retirement was painting in water colours. On 31 March 1971, he was among a select group of surviving foundation members who attended a celebratory dinner at the Hotel Canberra to mark the RAAF's Golden Jubilee; his fellow guests included Air Marshal Sir Richard Williams, Air Vice Marshals Henry Wrigley and Bill Anderson, and Wing Commander Sir Lawrence Wackett. Frank De La Rue died at his home in Kew, a suburb of Melbourne, on 18 May 1977. He was survived by his daughter, and cremated.

== Notes ==
Military offices
| New command | Air Officer Commanding Western Area; 1941–1943 | Succeeded by Air Commodore Raymond Brownell |
