= Delerue =

Delerue is a surname. A variant of the surname de Le Rue. Notable people with the surname include:

- Georges Delerue (1925–1992), French composer
- Henri Delerue (1939–2016), French racewalker
