= James Ramsay (governor) =

Governor of Queensland, Australia (1977–1985)

Commodore The Honourable Sir James Maxwell Ramsay KCMG KCVO CBE DSC
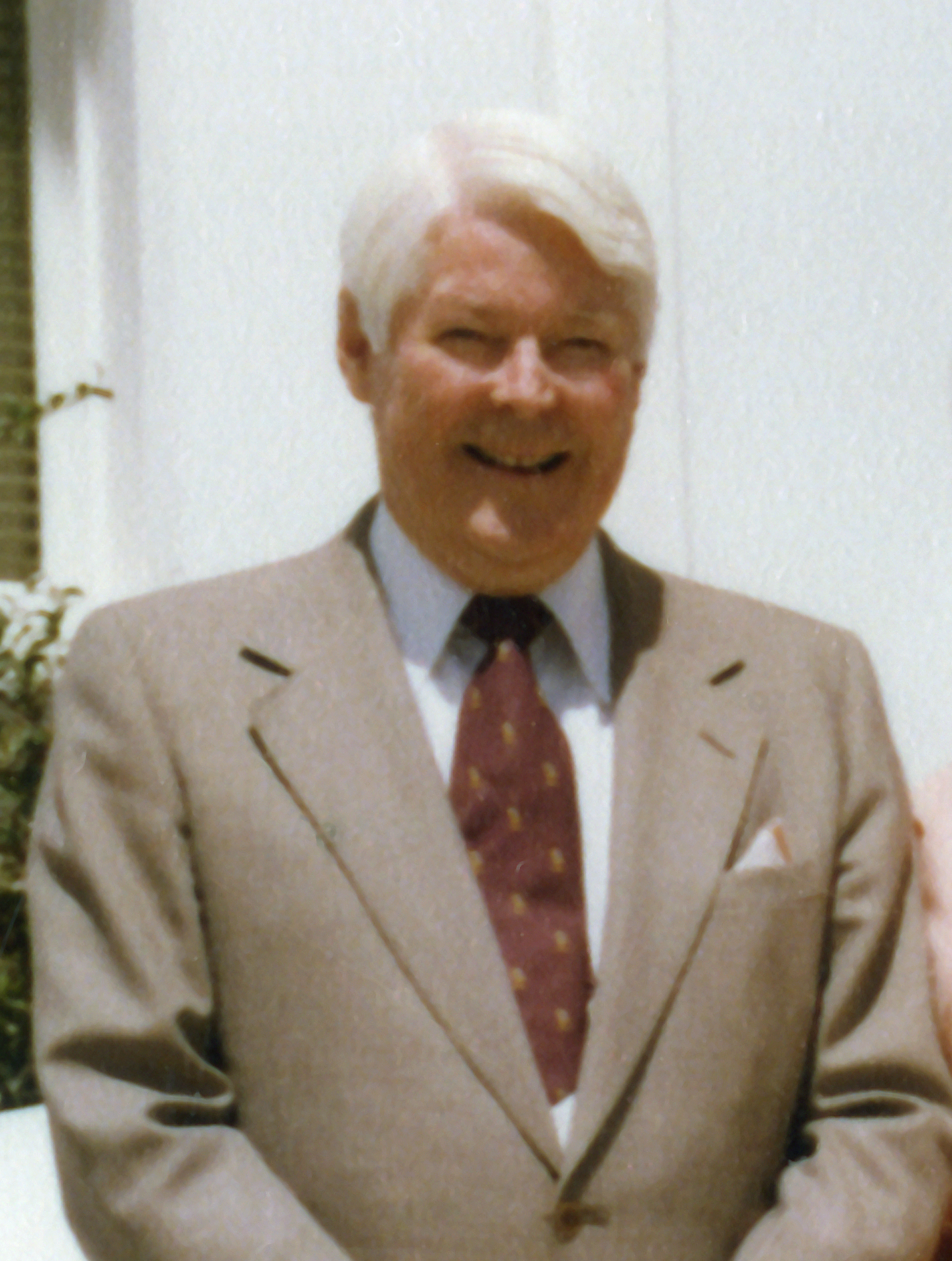
- J. M. Ramsay at Government House, Brisbane, 1978

20th Governor of Queensland
- In office 22 April 1977 – 21 July 1985
- Monarch: Elizabeth II
- Premier: Sir Joh Bjelke-Petersen
- Preceded by: Sir Colin Hannah
- Succeeded by: Sir Walter Campbell

Personal details
- Born: 27 August 1916 Hobart, Tasmania
- Died: 1 May 1986 (aged 69) Broadbeach, Queensland

Military service
- Allegiance: Australia
- Branch/service: Royal Australian Navy
- Years of service: 1930–1972
- Rank: Commodore
- Commands: HMAS Warramunga
- Battles/wars: Second World War; Korean War
- Awards: Knight Commander of the Order of St Michael and St George; Knight Commander of the Royal Victorian Order; Knight Bachelor; Commander of the Order of the British Empire; Distinguished Service Cross; Knight of the Order of St John; Officer of the Legion of Merit (United States)

Sir James Maxwell Ramsay (27 August 1916 – 1 May 1986) was a senior officer in the Royal Australian Navy, serving forty-two years, and the 20th Governor of Queensland, for eight years.

== Early life ==
Ramsay was one of six surviving children. He attended the Macquarie Street State School and The Hutchins School in Hobart. He proved himself to be quite adept at what he attempted in these schools; he was successful in becoming a cadet captain, excelled in Rugby, and was a high achiever in academic and professional subjects.

== Naval career ==
Appointed a naval cadet, a cadet midshipman, on 1 January 1930, he graduated from the Royal Australian Naval College at Flinders Naval Depot in 1933 and was appointed a midshipman on 1 May 1934.

His early on-board service included:

- HMAS Australia (D84) (1934–1936);
- HMAS Albatross (1928) (1938), a seaplane carrier;
- HMAS Hobart (D63);
- HMAS Swan (U74) (1939) as navigator; and
- HMAS Adelaide (1918).

During World War II he served on British and Australian ships in the Indian, Atlantic, and Pacific Oceans, including:

- HMAS Hobart (D63) (September 1939), with service in the Red Sea and Indian Ocean, based in Aden;
- HMS King George V (41), as assistant fleet navigator of the Home Fleet, based in Scapa Flow. This included action related to the sinking of the Bismarck;
- HMS Danae (D44) (1942), as navigator on the cruiser, based in Singapore then Jakarta, before they fell to the Imperial Japanese Army. The cruiser went to the Persian Gulf, then the United Kingdom;
- HMAS Bungaree, as navigator on the minelayer, which worked the area of New Guinea, Noumea, and the Great Barrier Reef;
- HMAS Warramunga (I44) (Feb 1944), as navigating officer, including taking part in the capture of Manus Island from Japanese forces;
- HMAS Napier (August 1944), as navigator, around the Arakan coast of then-Burma; and
- HMAS Australia (D84) (April 1945), as navigator of the cruiser, having served on her a decade prior.

In 1945 Ramsay attended the Royal Naval Staff College, Greenwich, England, and in the same year was married. Post-war, he took up position as Staff Officer, Operations and Intelligence, to Commander John Collins, then to Rear-Admiral Harold Farncomb. In 1948 as a lieutenant-commander, he went to the United Kingdom to commission the aircraft carrier HMAS Sydney (R17).

In 1950 he became the Director of Training and Staff Requirements, in Melbourne. In 1951 he was the Director of Plans at the naval office, before his next posting, whilst also being promoted from lieutenant-commander to commander.

In January 1952 Ramsay was a commander, and took charge for the destroyer HMAS Warramunga (1942–1959) for her second Korean War tour, before she was decommissioned in November 1952. His duties were to stop all enemy shipping in the vicinity of the North Korean coast, which did experience enemy contact. In 1952 he transferred as commander to HMAS Arunta, before a 1953 exchange with the Royal Navy. For Warramunga duties, he was awarded the Distinguished Service Cross and the US Legion of Merit, which involved the rescue of two US minesweepers whilst under fire.

In 1955 Ramsay attended the US Armed Forces Staff College, Virginia, and in the next year was appointed as captain, as Director of Plans. He then commanded HMAS Vendetta, and other roles include honorary aide-de-camp to the Queen, culminating as Naval Officer Commanding, in the Western Australia area.

Ramsay was awarded a Commander of the Order of the British Empire (Military Division) in the 1966 Birthday Honours.

In 1972 he retired from the navy.

== Post-military duties ==
Ramsay served as Lieutenant-Governor of Western Australia from 1974 until 1977.

In the Queen's 1976 New Year Honours, Ramsay was made a Knight Bachelor "for service to the State in a Vice Regal capacity".

He then became the twentieth governor of Queensland, serving from 22 April 1977 until 21 July 1985, He was the first Queensland governor with a naval background, as well as the fourth Australian-born governor. He actively served as the chief scout for Queensland, while Lady Ramsay served as the president of the state's girl guide association. Ramsay was awarded in 1984 a Doctor of Laws, honoris causa, by the University of Queensland. Visiting every local government area, one of his personal accomplishments was visiting the staff of every lighthouse in the state. In his time, he delivered a comprehensive history of his vice-regal residence at Fernberg. The turmoils of the incumbent Liberal-National government at the end of his tenure became a matter that faced the incoming governor.

== Later life ==
Ramsay married Janet Grace Burley, an Australian Red Cross welfare officer, on 24 November 1945 at the historic parish church, Denham, Buckinghamshire, the home of her family's country house. The couple first met at a lunch onboard HMAS Australia at Plymouth. They had a son and three daughters.

Aged 69 on the Gold Coast, Queensland following a boating trip, he died of a heart attack in May 1986. Ramsay received a naval state funeral, complete with a gun carriage to carry the coffin. He was given as having a "delightful sense of humour" and a "very pleasant personality". Lady Ramsay died in December 2003, aged 84.

Government offices
Preceded by Sir Colin Hannah	Governor of Queensland; 1977–1985	Succeeded by Sir Walter Campbell
