= Western Australian emergency of March 1942 =

War time emergency in Western Australia in March 1942

- Part of the Pacific War
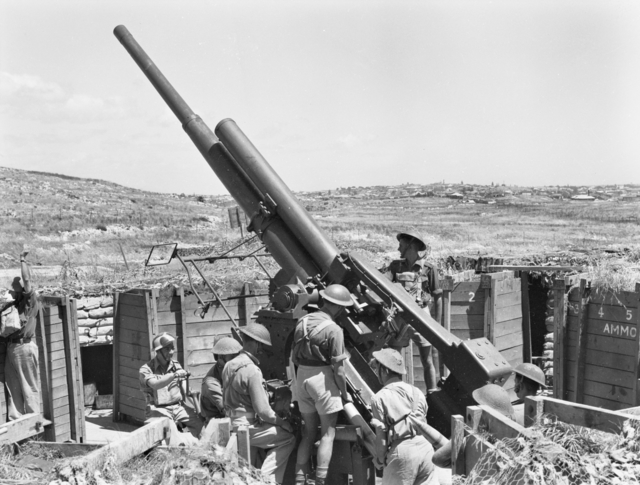
- One of the anti-aircraft guns assigned to the defence of Fremantle during a training exercise in November 1943
- Objective: Reinforcement of Western Australia in response to a feared Japanese attack
- Date: March 1942

The Western Australian emergency of March 1942 was a series of local responses that occurred in relation to activity in northern Western Australia that gave Australian military forces serious concerns about the capacity of the Japanese to move down the Western Australian coast.

- Singapore fell on 15 February 1942 with more than 50,000 men becoming prisoners of war, including the WA raised 2/4 Machine Gun Battalion.
- Darwin was bombed on 19 February by the same Japanese fleet that had attacked Pearl Harbor.
- On 3 March, Broome was attacked from the air, killing many refugees from the Netherlands East Indies which had now been captured along with the Philippines.

The air raids on Broome and other locations in March 1942 caused the Allies to reinforce the military forces located in Western Australia to defend the state.

The action was taken to defend against the possibility that a force of Japanese warships and planes would attempt to attack the cities of Fremantle and Perth.

The speed and extent of Japanese expansion to this time was considered a major threat to the region.

Extensive preparations and actions throughout the state of Western Australia were conducted to avert attacks and to prepare the population against possible invasion.

Japanese propaganda was produced at the time to spread the idea of invasion or bombing of southern Australian cities. Authorities were attempting to allay fears a month before the Darwin bombings.

The events surrounding the bombings and response by authorities in northern Australia were referred to as "Japanese Scare" tactics.

The work undertaken in Fremantle and Perth to prepare for an imminent invasion or attack was the most extensive in the history of Western Australia.

The establishment of the Fremantle submarine base was a part of the defensive actions, and it remained active until the end of the war.

The subsequent Western Australian emergency of March 1944 was in effect a repeat of the 1942 emergency.

== See also ==
- Fremantle Fortress
