= RAAF Station Cunderdin =

- IATA: none; ICAO: none

Summary
- Location: Cunderdin, Western Australia
- Coordinates: 31.624031°S 117.22377°E
- Interactive map of RAAF Station Cunderdin

RAAF Station Cunderdin was a Royal Australian Air Force (RAAF) airfield located at Cunderdin, Western Australia, during World War II.

== History ==
Cunderdin was home to No. 9 Elementary Flying Training School (No. 9 EFTS) and No. 17 Repair and Salvage Unit. The RAAF also assembled a number of Curtiss P-40 Kittyhawk fighter aircraft at Cunderdin in March 1942 to provide air defence coverage of Perth.

Between March and June 1942, two Consolidated B-24 Liberator heavy bombers of the United States Army Air Forces (USAAF) 28th Bombardment Squadron, from the 19th Bombardment Group, were based at Cunderdin and carried out long-range ocean patrols in the defence of southern Western Australia.

No. 25 (City of Perth) Squadron was based at Cunderdin from February 1945, operating Liberators until its disbandment in 1946. The remains of a No. 25 Squadron B-24 (A72-124) is located at the end of one of the runways.

In June 1945, No. 86 Operational Base Unit took over the running of the RAAF base at Cunderdin from No. 9 EFTS.

Cunderdin Airfield was employed as a migrant camp between 1949 and 1952, with a capacity of 700 persons. It is currently used as a civilian airfield and headquarters for the Gliding Club of Western Australia.
