= Maurice Delarue =

French journalist

Maurice Delarue (26 July 1919; Antrain, Ille-et-Vilaine, France – 10 March 2013) was a French journalist.

He was a member and former president of the International Francophone Press Union and a member of the Association of the Diplomatic Press (former president from 1962 till 1963).

== Biography ==
Compelled to stop his studies of English in Rennes to enter in the Résistance, Maurice Delarue began his career as journalist in France Soir. He was also a journalist for Le Monde, where he covered foreign affairs matters up to his retirement.

== Bibliography ==
- Contre la mémoire courte (L'Âge d'Homme 1999) ISBN 2-8251-1333-6
