= No. 11 Group RAAF =

- Active: 1945–46
- Country: Australia
- Branch: Royal Australian Air Force

Commanders
- Commander: Air Commodore Raymond Brownell

Aircraft flown
- Fighter: Supermarine Spitfire, Curtiss P-40

No. 11 Group was a Royal Australian Air Force (RAAF) group formed at Morotai in the last weeks of World War II to command the RAAF's garrison units in the region. The group was established at the end of July 1945 but was not yet fully active when the war ended on 14 August. It remained active at Morotai until being disbanded at the end of March 1946.

== History ==
=== Establishment ===
During 1944 and 1945, the RAAF's Australian First Tactical Air Force (No. 1 TAF) took part in the advance of Allied forces along the northern coast of New Guinea, followed by the invasions of Morotai in the Netherlands East Indies and several locations on or around Borneo. While No. 1 TAF was intended to operate as a highly mobile striking force, by mid-1945, these operations had left it operating a string of bases outside of the main combat zones. These bases required air garrisons to protect them from remnant Japanese forces, as well as administrative units to maintain a supply chain back to Australia.

In order to free No. 1 TAF from its garrison duties and enable it to focus on future offensives, the RAAF proposed to the Commonwealth Government that a static command be established. It was intended that this command would comprise elements of No. 1 TAF and Northern Command. In recommending its establishment (initially as "No. 1 Air Garrison Force"), Air Vice Marshal Bill Bostock explained that while it shared the static characteristic of an area command, it differed in that the area commands were part of the RAAF's permanent structure and situated within the borders of Australia's mainland and overseas territories, whereas the new formation was a temporary wartime measure, headquartered on foreign territory. The Government agreed to the proposal, and No. 11 Group was established at Morotai on 16 July 1945. The group's inaugural commanding officer was Air Commodore Raymond Brownell, who had previously been Air Officer Commanding, Western Area.

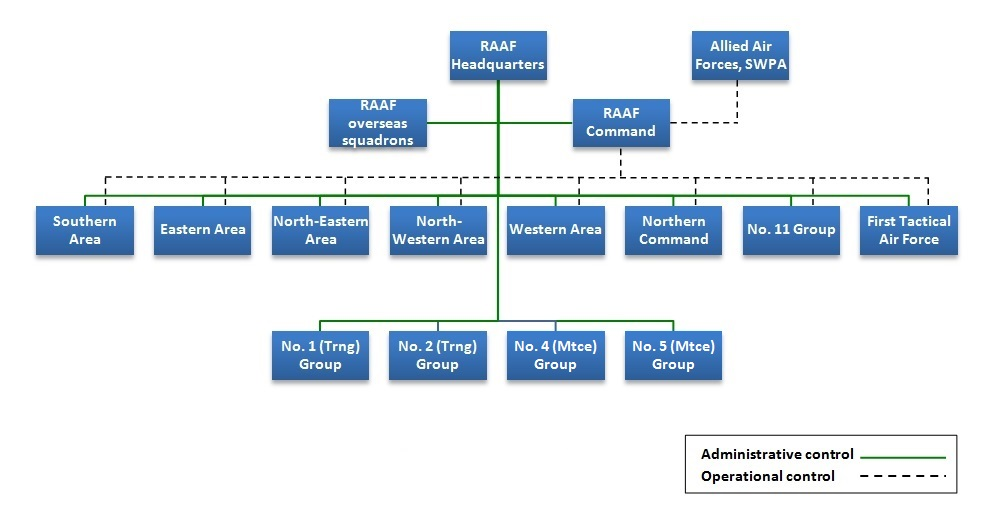
The RAAF's higher organisation as at August 1945

=== Operations ===
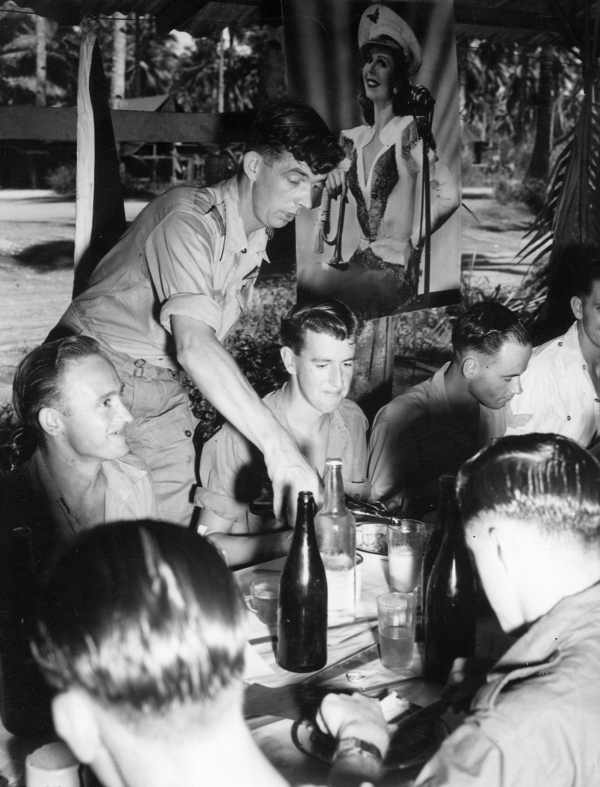
The commanding officer of No. 11 Group serving a drink to an airman at the group headquarters' Christmas dinner

No. 11 Group took over administrative control of all RAAF units on Morotai on 30 July. Its initial area of responsibility was all Dutch territory north of latitude 7 degrees south and east of longitude 108 degrees east, as well as British North Borneo and Sarawak. The principal RAAF airfields in these areas were at Hollandia, Biak, Middelburg, Morotai, Labuan and Tarakan.

The group had three main responsibilities:

1. Local air defence duties and sea lane protection
2. Support of adjacent formations and offensive operations against Japanese targets within range
3. Line of communication duties

It was planned that No. 11 Group would initially consist of its headquarters and No. 79, No. 452, No. 457 and No. 120 squadrons, all of which were equipped with fighter aircraft. On 30 July No. 80 Wing's headquarters was absorbed into No. 11 Group, with most of its personnel being transferred into the newly formed group. No. 11 Telecommunications Unit was also formed on 1 August to provide communications services for the group.

The war ended before No. 11 Group was fully formed and assumed its full responsibilities, and its combat operations were limited to small strikes against Japanese positions on Halmahera. No. 79 Squadron attacked Halmahera with its Spitfire fighters on 30 and 31 July. These attacks were followed up by a larger operation on 4 August in which No. 11 Group commanded an attack on Halmahera which involved twelve B-24 Liberator heavy bombers from the United States Thirteenth Air Force and six No. 79 Squadron Spitfires. No. 79 Squadron continued daily operations against Halmahera until the end of the war. No. 11 Group also directed heavy bomber operations conducted by No. 82 Wing on an unofficial basis in the last days of the war.

No. 11 Group celebrated Christmas 1945 with a formal dinner. It was disbanded at Morotai on 31 March 1946.
