= No. 25 Squadron RAAF =

Royal Australian Air Force squadron

- No. 25 Squadron crest
- Active: 1937–1946; 1948–present
- Country: Australia
- Branch: Royal Australian Air Force
- Role: Air Force Reserves
- Part of: Combat Support Group
- Garrison/HQ: RAAF Base Pearce
- Motto: Defendo
- Engagements: World War II
- Battle honours: Eastern Waters 1941–1945

Commanders
- Notable commanders: Raymond Brownell (1938–1940); Neville McNamara (1957–1959)

No. 25 (City of Perth) Squadron is a general reserve squadron of the Royal Australian Air Force (RAAF). It is based at RAAF Base Pearce in Perth, Western Australia, and forms part of the Combat Support Group. The squadron was formed in early 1937 and until early 1939 was designated as No. 23 (City of Perth) Squadron. During World War II, it provided local air defence for the Perth region, before undertaking Army co-operation duties in 1943–1944 and then converting to a heavy bomber role in 1945. Flying B-24 Liberators, the squadron took part in operations against Japanese targets in the Netherlands (or Dutch) East Indies (NEI) and supported Allied ground operations during the Borneo Campaign.

Following the end of hostilities, No. 25 Squadron was disbanded in mid-1946 but was re-raised two years later as a Citizen Air Force (CAF) unit based at RAAF Base Pearce. From 1948 the squadron's reservist (CAF) and Permanent Air Force (PAF) pilots flew fighter aircraft, initially Mustangs, later also Vampire jets, to provide air defence over Western Australia. In 1960 the squadron ceased flying duties and switched to the ground support role. In 1989, flying operations resumed with the Macchi MB-326 as No. 25 Squadron assumed responsibility for jet introduction training and fleet support; this role ceased in 1998 and since then the squadron has been tasked with providing a pool of trained personnel to the Air Force.

== History ==
No. 25 Squadron was formed at RAAF Station Laverton in Victoria, on 3 May 1937 and was initially known as "No. 23 (City of Perth) Squadron". Equipped with 6 Hawker Demons, 6 Avro Ansons and 3 Avro Trainers it was originally tasked with providing support for the Australian Army and Royal Australian Navy, as well as pilot training. The squadron moved to RAAF Station Pearce in Perth, Western Australia, in 1938. The squadron's first commanding officer was Raymond Brownell. It was renamed No. 25 Squadron on 1 January 1939. Following the declaration of World War II, the squadron was allocated Australian-built, 2 seater Wirraways, operating these in convoy protection and anti-submarine roles off the Western Australia coast around Fremantle and Rottnest Island. Squadron aircraft participated in the protection of convoys transporting the 2nd AIF to the Middle East and in the unsuccessful search for survivors from HMAS Sydney, the RAN cruiser sunk on 19 November 1941 by the German raider Kormoran off Western Australia's mid-west coast.

After Japan entered the war, the squadron's Wirraways were complemented in 1942 by Brewster Buffaloes originally intended for the NEI Air Force. Although these two aircraft types were already considered obsolete as fighters No. 25 Squadron was tasked with providing the air defence of Perth, amid concerns of a possible Japanese invasion.

The squadron's Buffalos were replaced with Vultee Vengeance dive bombers in August 1943 and in an army cooperation role it began joint exercises with Army units in Western Australia.On 27 August 1944 Vengeance A27-295 disappeared in bad weather during a cross country formation flight exercise. 4 days after successfully bailing out the pilot reached safety at a remote farm house. The aircraft's wreckage was found on 3 September but despite a 20 day air and land search no trace of the aircraft's navigator/wireless operator has ever been found.

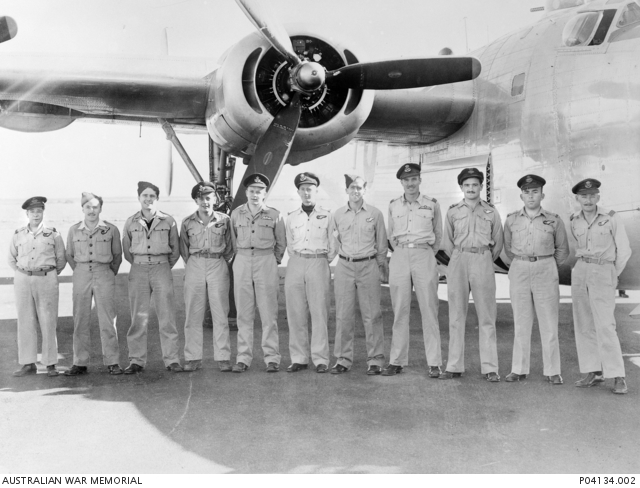
A No. 25 Squadron B-24 Liberator bomber and its crew, wearing the RAAF's then khaki "summer dress" uniform, at RAAF Base Cunderdin in 1945.

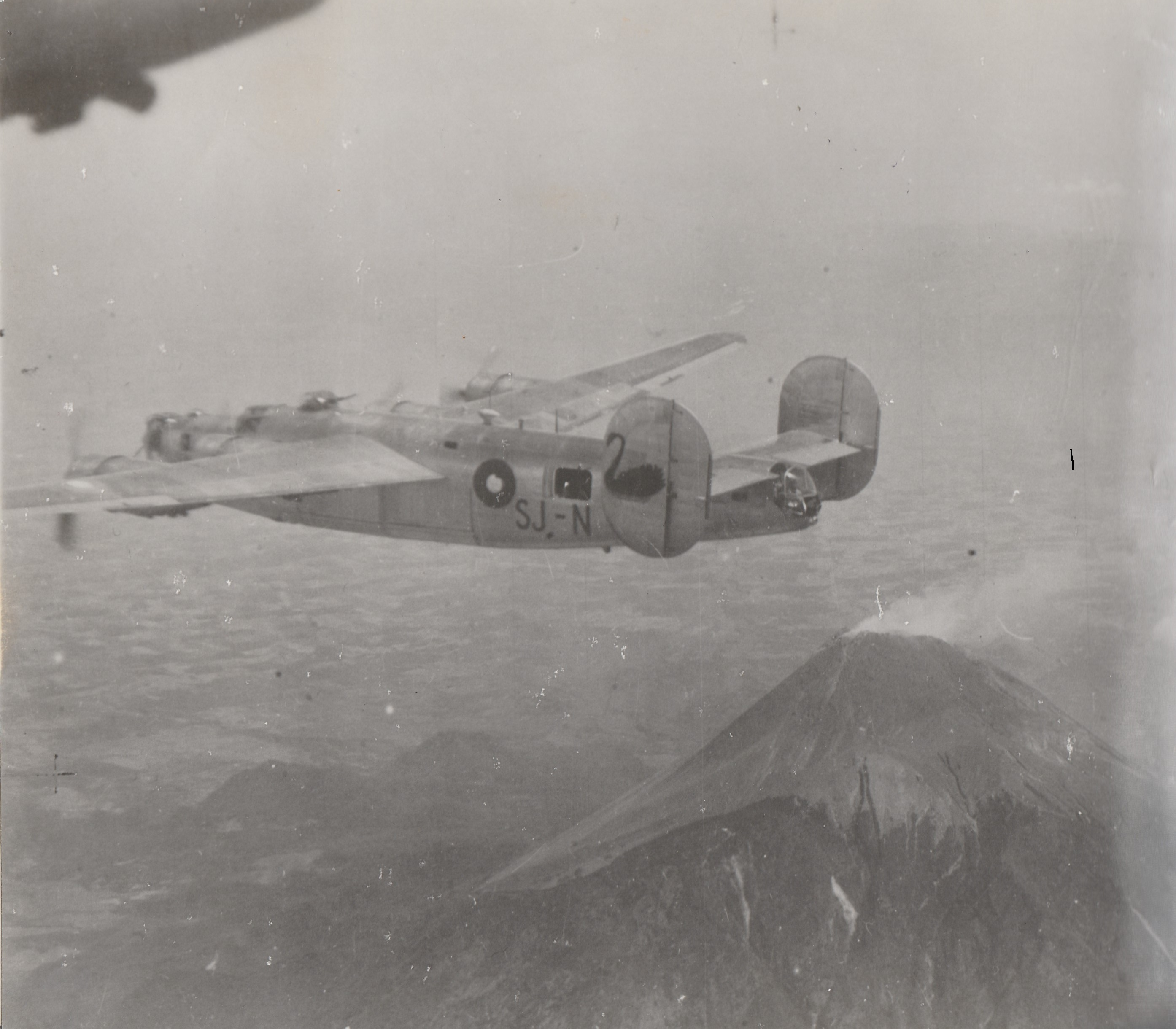
RAAF photo circa Mar-Aug 1945: A No. 25 Squadron B-24 Liberator over the Netherlands (Dutch) East Indies (NEI or DEI - now Indonesia).

With the threat of invasion passed, by early January 1945 the squadron was re-located to Cunderdin and re-equipped with B-24 Liberator heavy bombers tasked with attacking Japanese shipping and base facilities in the Japanese occupied Netherlands East Indies (NEI – now Indonesia). Operations against these targets began 2 months later with the squadron's Liberators usually staging from Cunderdin through Corunna Downs and Truscott airfields in north-Western Australia. From March to August 1945 the squadron's Liberators flew a combined total of at least 85 missions totaling 5,960 hours against enemy targets, including diversionary raids over NEI to assist the Allied landings at Brunei Bay in northern Borneo. During these operations one Liberator (A72-133) was lost on a 26/27 April 1945 night strike when it was forced to land in shallow water off a Japanese held island in the Lesser Sunda group. The aircraft's crew survived the war after 4 months of brutal treatment as POWs in Batavia (now Jakarta).

The AWM's WWII Honour Roll for 25 Squadron lists 23 members who died on WWII service, including 6 due to ground incidents or illness. Five aircrew died as a result of 3 Wirraway crashes from February 1941 to July 1943 and 7 died in 4 Vultee Vengeance crashes from September 1943 to August 1944. The squadron's worst loss occurred on 14 February 1945 when 5 of the 11 aboard Liberator A72-124 died when it crashed on take-off at Cunderdin.

The aircraft was tasked to participate in the squadron's successful search for survivors from the SS Peter Silvester after it was torpedoed 1300 kilometres off the WA coast on 6 February 1945 by the German submarine U-862. The squadron's search flights of up to 19 hours duration were instrumental in the rescue of 100 of the 174 aboard the last Allied ship lost to enemy action in the Indian Ocean.

In the months following the end of the war, No. 25 Squadron aircraft evacuated liberated prisoners of war to Australia from Morotai and Borneo. The squadron was disbanded in July 1946.

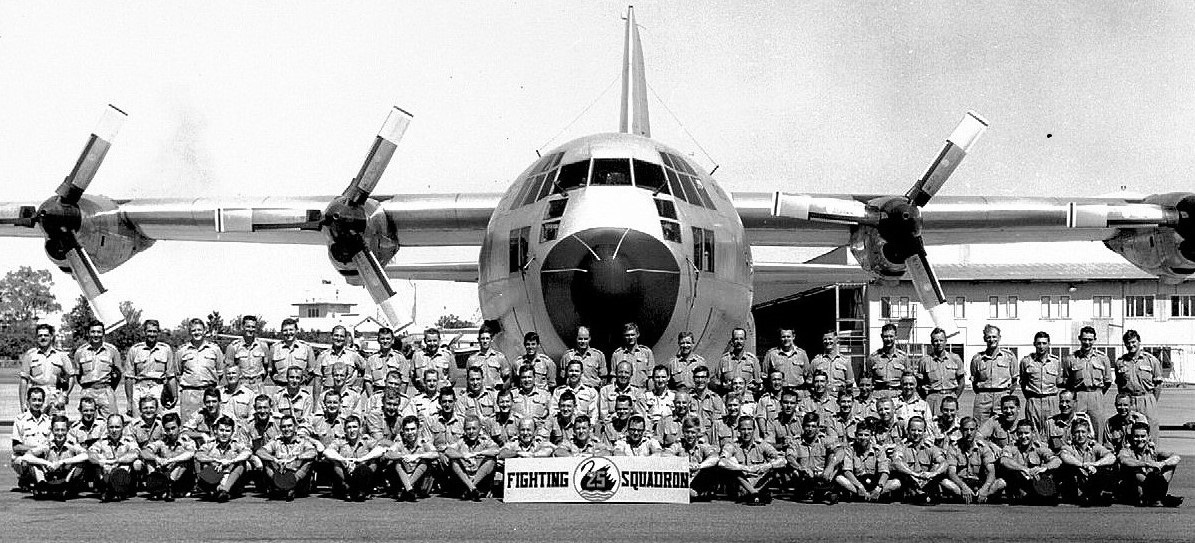
RAAF photo June 1967: No 25 Squadron [Commanding Officer, Squadron Leader C H Mawby (PLT)] in old "summer dress" uniform on annual camp at RAAF Base Darwin (NT) during exercise "High Venus".

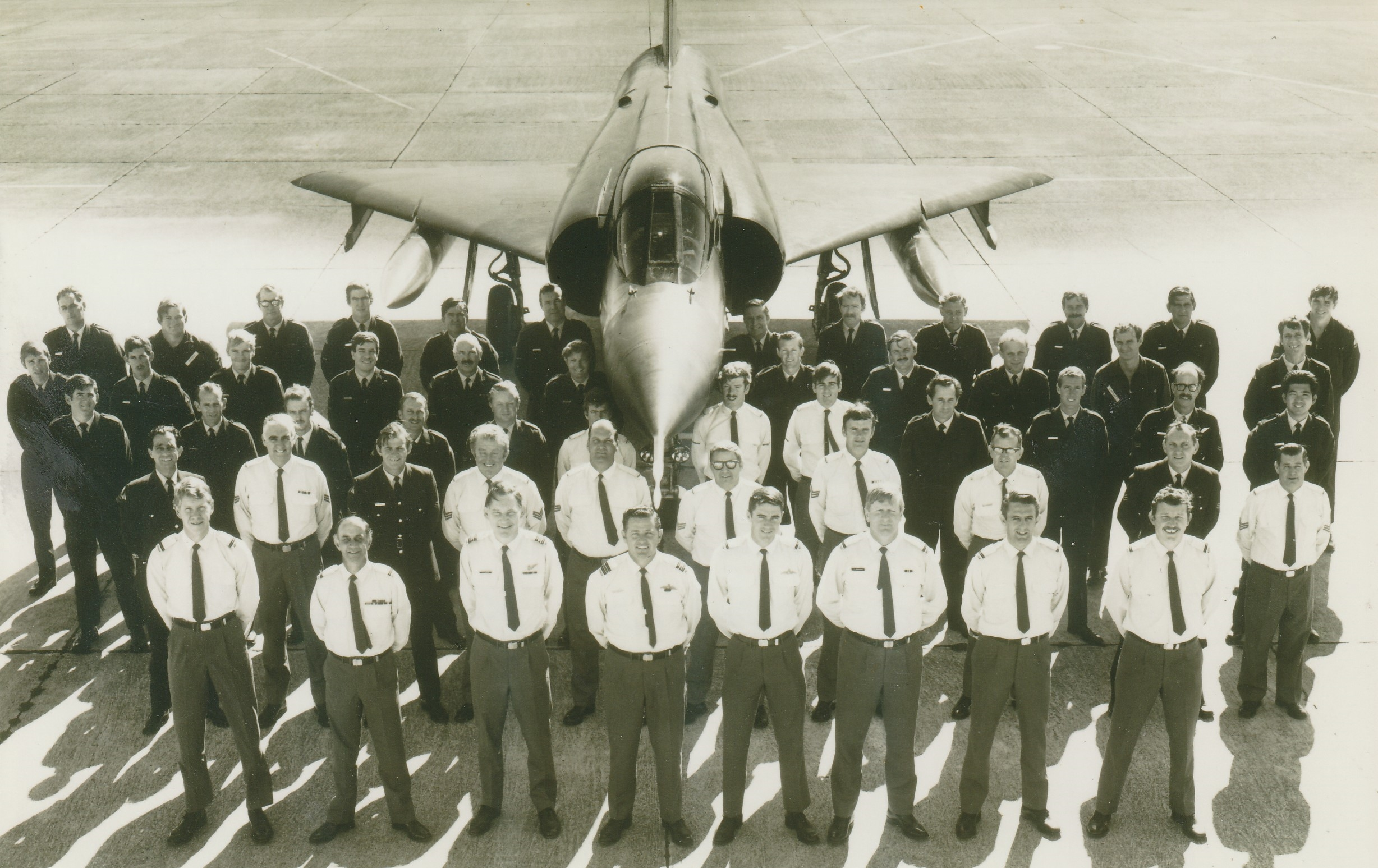
RAAF photo c1972-73: No 25 Squadron [Commanding Officer, Squadron Leader H A Collits (PLT)] on an annual camp providing technical and non-technical support to Mirage lll fighter and other units at RAAF Williamtown, New South Wales. Uniforms are a mix of the RAAF's then new light blue "all-seasons" uniform and the dark blue World War II-era winter "battle dress".

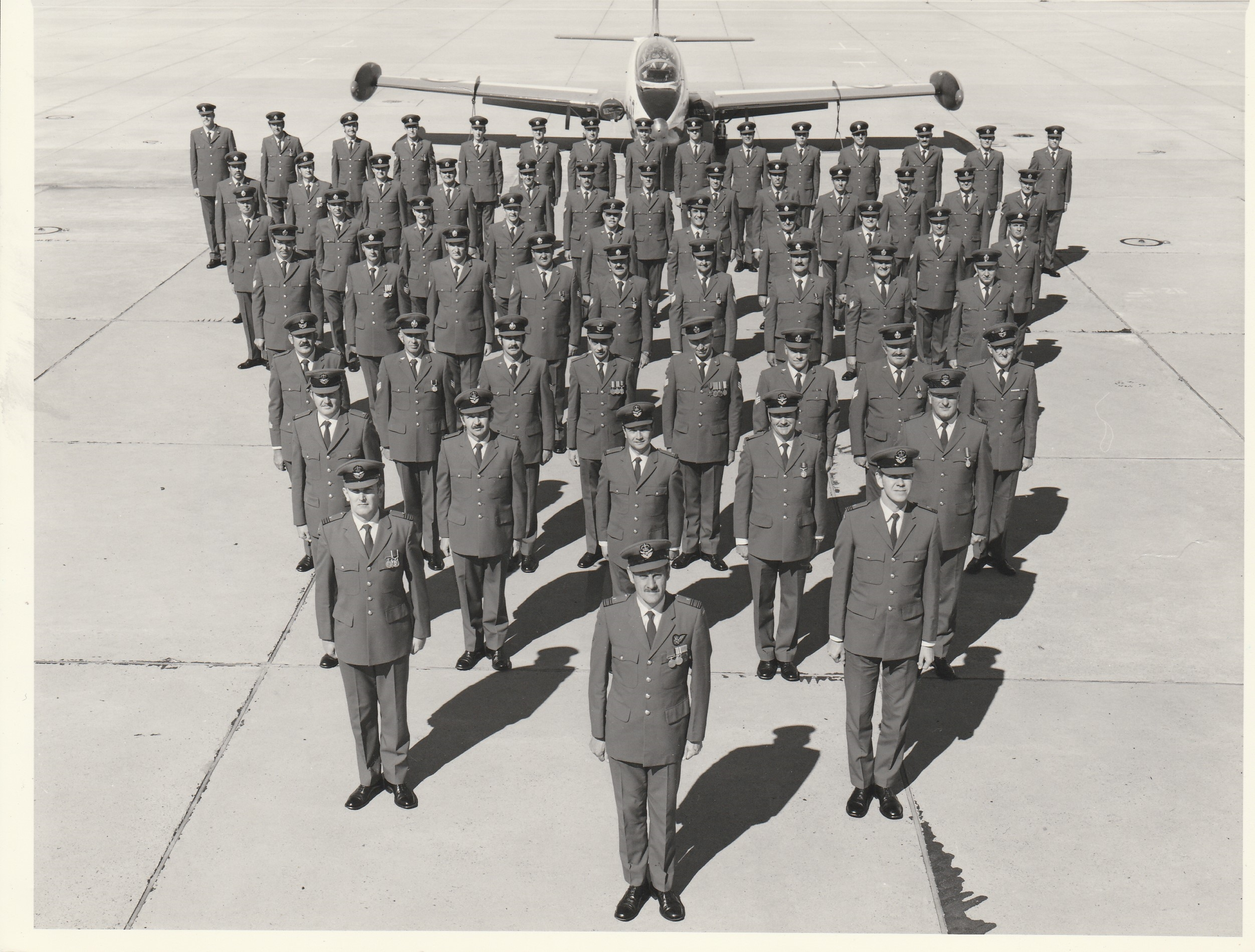
RAAF photo c1974-76: No 25 Squadron [Commanding Officer, Squadron Leader K R Page (NAV)] at its home base, RAAF Pearce, Western Australia wearing the RAAF's then (1970s – 2005) light blue "all-seasons" uniform with "cool weather" tunics.

No. 25 Squadron was reformed in April 1948 as a Citizen Air Force unit based at RAAF Pearce. Between 1948 and 1960, the squadron trained reservist pilots and ground crew and operated Australian-built or assembled P-51 Mustangs and de Havilland Vampires, along with Tiger Moth and Wirraway trainers. From late 1951 the Vampire jets enhanced satisfaction of the squadron's responsibility for maintaining a fighter presence in Western Australia.

Doing so came at a cost. From 1948 to 1960 two No. 25 Squadron pilots died in flying accidents; the first when Mustang A68-13 crashed at the RAAF Pearce bombing range on 2 June 1950; the second when Vampire A79-536 crashed during a flying display at a RAAF Pearce Open Day on 18 September 1955.

In 1960 the squadron's flying role ceased and it began providing ground support for PAF units at RAAF Base Pearce and until 1981, for its affiliated fighter squadron at RAAF Base Williamtown. In 1989, with a substantially increased number of PAF personnel and equipped with the 2-seat Aermacchi MB-326 aircraft, the squadron resumed flying operations in the roles of initial jet training at RAAF Pearce and providing fleet support for the Royal Australian Navy. With its Macchi aircraft, supplemented later with Pilatus PC-9 turbo-prop aircraft, No. 25 Squadron was the only flying RAAF Reserve squadron.

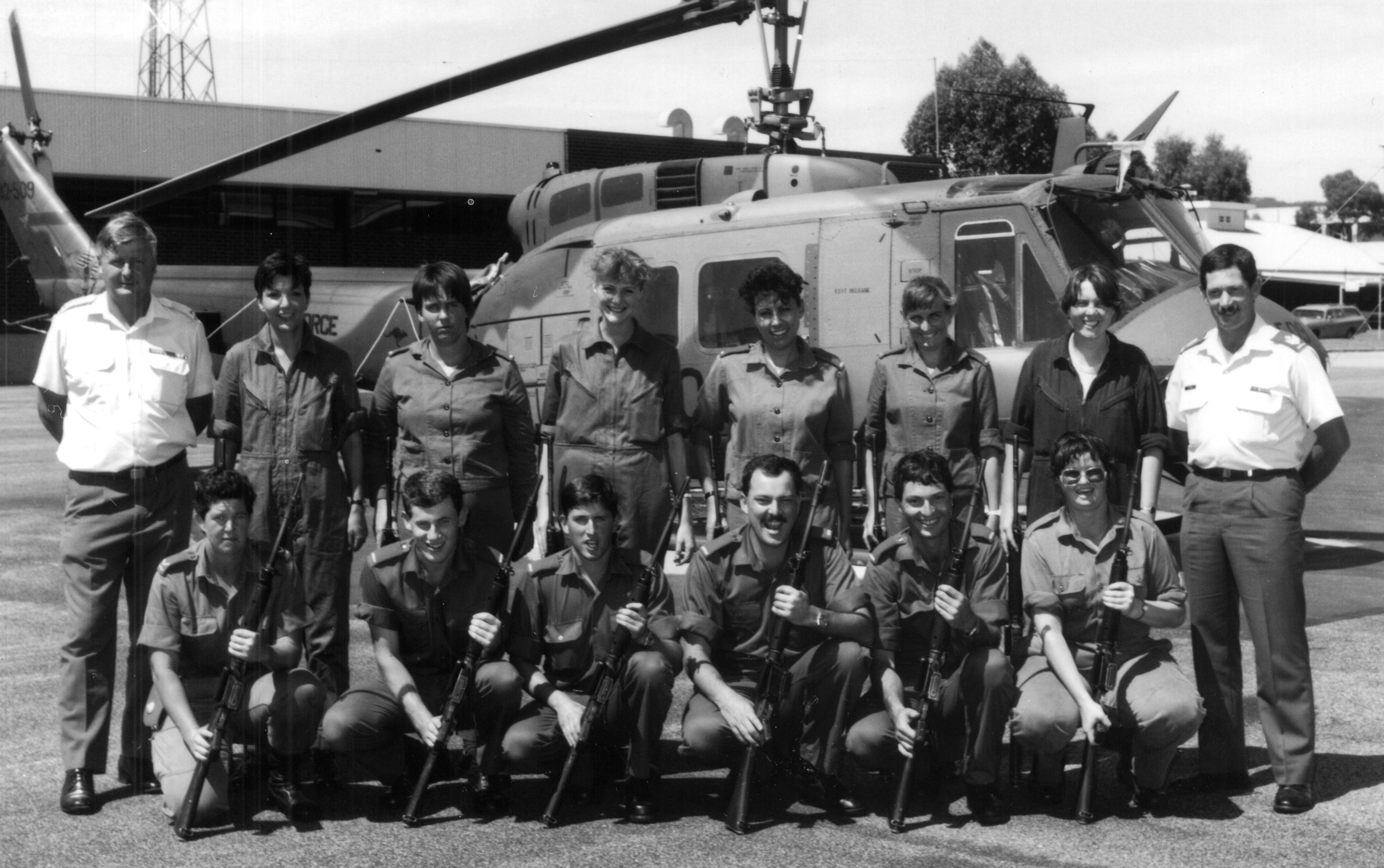
Members of 25 Squadron on a training exercise in 1990 at RAAF Base Pearce with A2-509 of 5 Squadron. W/O Hull left rear, and F/SGT Ron Pearse right rear.

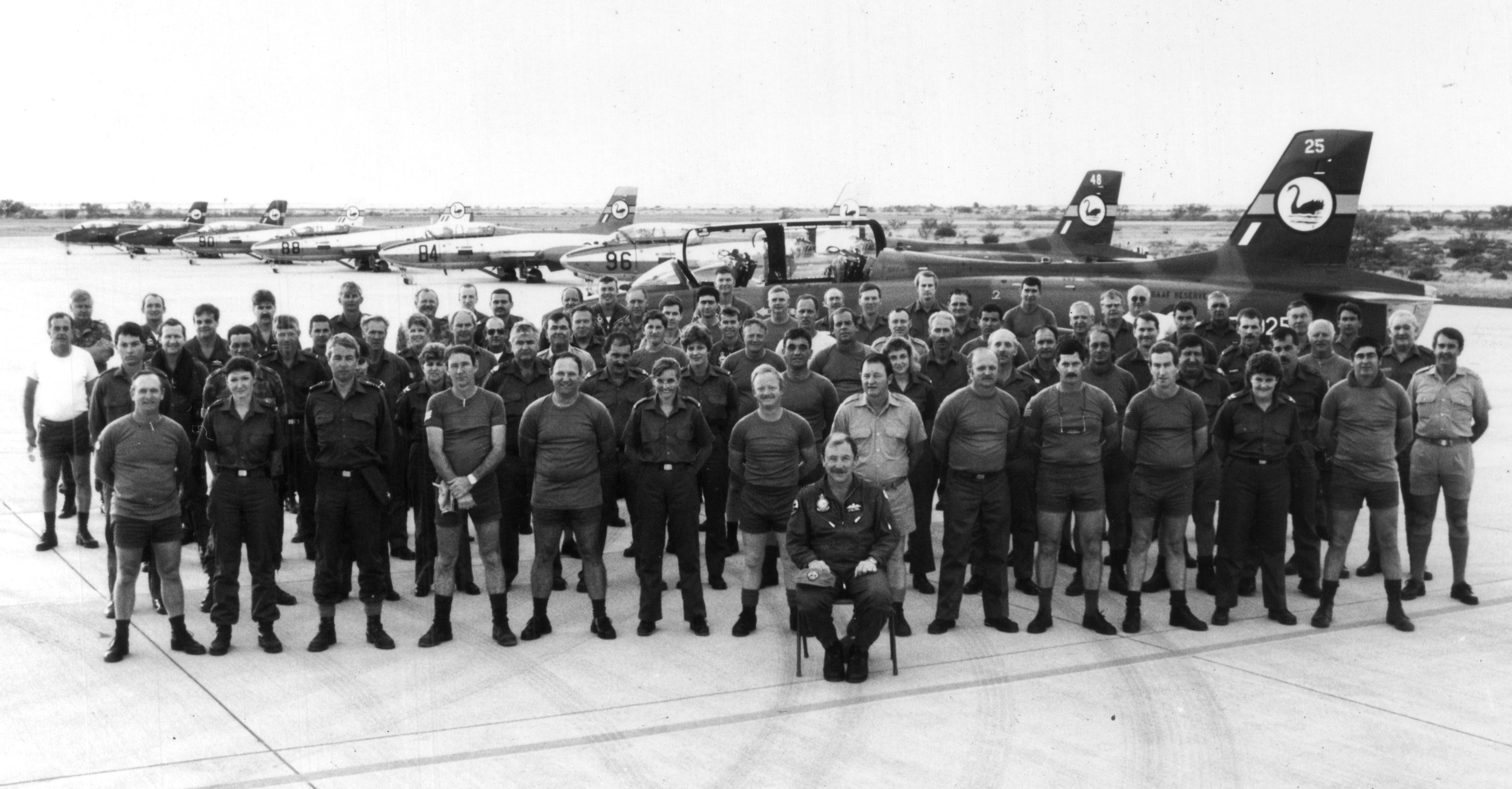
No. 25 Squadron [Commanding Officer Wing Commander G J Ennis DFC (PLT)] in "working dress" on exercises at RAAF Base Learmonth in 1991 – the Squadron's traditional Black Swan tail emblem is clearly displayed on its Macchi aircraft.

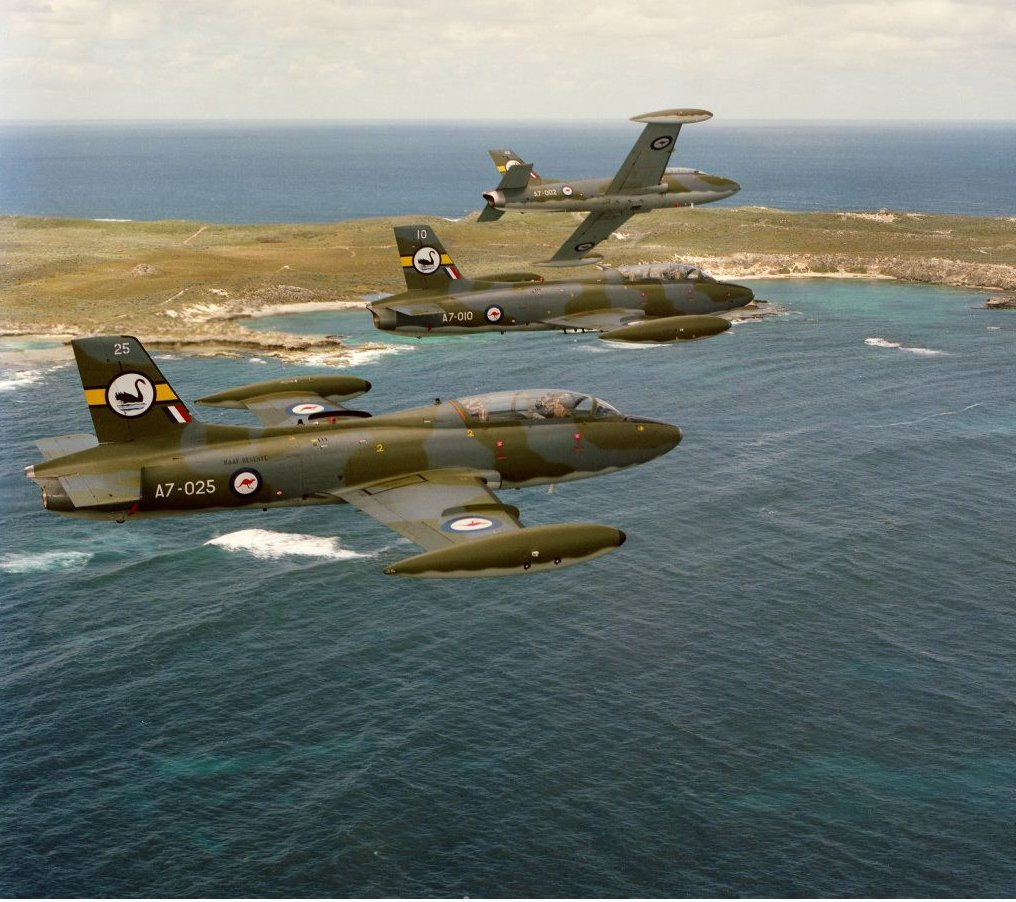
RAAF photo c1995: No. 25 Squadron Macchi MB-326 aircraft over Rottnest Island, Western Australia.

On 1 July 1998, the majority of 25 Squadron's PAF component were separated from the Reserve element and reformed as No. 79 Squadron, taking with it responsibility for flying operations. No. 25 Squadron returned to its role of providing a reserve pool of trained personnel to PAF units as part of 96 Wing in the Combat Support Group.

In recognition of its long flying and non-flying history, on 31 October 1975 the squadron was presented with the No. 25 Squadron Standard. Mounted on a wooden pike surmounted by a Golden Eagle the Standard is a fringed and tasselled Air Force blue silken banner with a decorative border of roses, thistles, shamrocks, leeks and wattle. A white scroll inscribed with the squadron's World War II Battle Honour Eastern Waters 1941–1945 is shown to the left of the No. 25 Squadron Crest.

On 2 March 1976 No. 25 Squadron was granted the "Freedom of Entry to the City of Perth" by the City's Lord Mayor and Council. The squadron has also received the annual Air Force Association (AFA) Trophy for "the most proficient Air Force Reserve Squadron" nine times (1961, 1963, 1964, 1969, 1976, 1999, 2005, 2006 and 2008) since the award's inception in 1961 (the award was suspended from 2010 until its re-introduction in 2017 as an award for RAAF wings and groups).

In 2015 No. 25 (City of Perth) Squadron was awarded the 2014 Hawker Siddeley trophy as "the most proficient RAAF unit with primary whole of base support functions". The Award recognised the Squadron's part in RAAF Bases Pearce and Learmonth providing from 18 March 2014, air basing and support for the multi-national search for Malaysian Airlines Flight 370 [Operation Southern Indian Ocean (SIO)].

== See also ==
- Vultee Vengeance in Australian service

== Bibliography ==
- Dennis, Peter; et al. (1995). The Oxford Companion to Australian Military History (1st ed.). Melbourne, Victoria: Oxford University Press Australia & New Zealand. ISBN 0-19-553227-9.
- Eather, Steve (1995). Flying Squadrons of the Australian Defence Force. Weston Creek, Australian Capital Territory: Aerospace Publications. ISBN 1-875671-15-3.
- RAAF, Historical Section (1995). Units of the Royal Australian Air Force a concise history bomber units. Canberra, ACT: AGPS Press. ISBN 0644427957.
- Nelmes, Michael V (1994). Tocumwal to Tarakan Australians and the Consolidated B-24 Liberator. Belconnen, ACT: Banner Books. ISBN 1875593047.
- Lilleyman, Peter G (2023). No. 25 Squadron RAAF - Perth's Own Squadron: No. 25 City of Perth Squadron (Revised 2025); A Brief History & Some Personal Connections & Recollections. Perth, WA: Self-published Edeposit Publication NED 443731P1074722 Libraries Australia ID 144790579 on Trove as nla.gov.au/nla.obj-4141341898/view.
