= No. 2 Flying Training School RAAF =

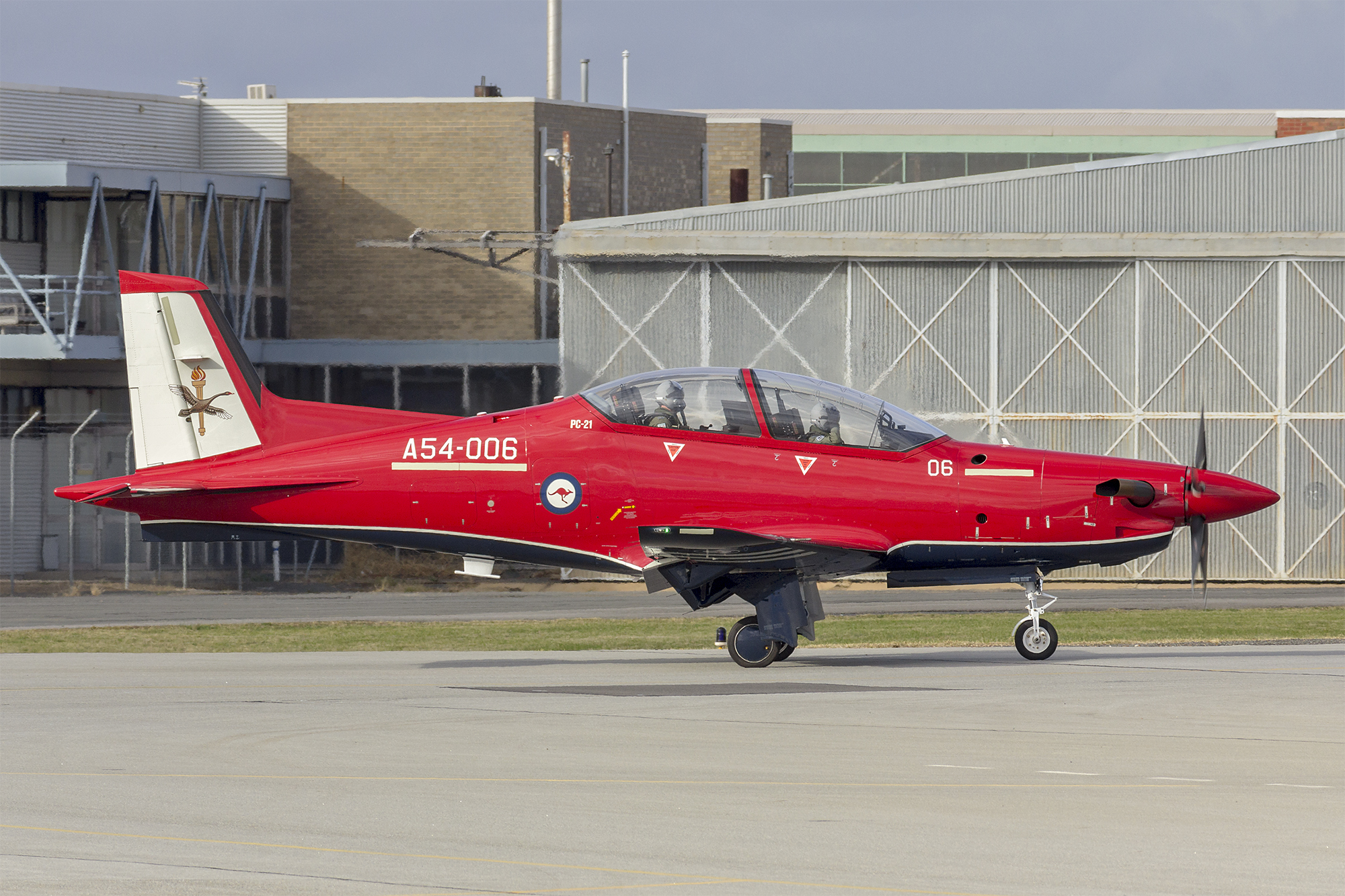
- No. 2 FTS Pilatus PC-21 in 2018
- Active: 1952–68 (No. 1 AFTS); 1969–current (No. 2 FTS)
- Allegiance: Australia
- Branch: Royal Australian Air Force
- Role: Advanced flying training
- Part of: Air Training Wing
- Garrison/HQ: RAAF Base Pearce
- Motto(s): "Seek the Heights"
- Aircraft: Pilatus PC-21

No. 2 Flying Training School (No. 2 FTS) is the main flying training school of the Royal Australian Air Force (RAAF). Formed under its present name in 1969, it is located at RAAF Base Pearce, Western Australia. The unit operates a fleet of Pilatus PC-21 turboprop trainers. No. 2 FTS traces its origins to the post-war re-establishment of the Air Force's original cadet training unit, No. 1 Flying Training School (No. 1 FTS), at RAAF Point Cook, Victoria, in 1947. Following reorganisation of aircrew training in 1951–52, No. 1 FTS was renamed No. 1 Applied Flying Training School (No. 1 AFTS), and began specialising in advanced flight instruction on CAC Wirraways. It relocated to RAAF Base Pearce in 1958, where it converted to De Havilland Vampire jet trainers. In January 1969, the school was reformed as No. 2 FTS, having the previous year begun replacing the Vampires with Macchi MB-326Hs. The Macchis were themselves replaced by the PC-9/A beginning in 1989.

== History ==
=== Origins and early years as No. 1 AFTS ===
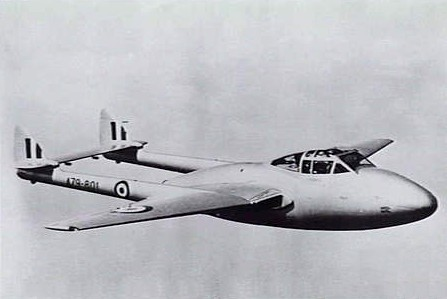
Vampire trainer similar to those used by No. 1 AFTS at RAAF Base Pearce beginning in 1958

In August 1947, No. 1 Flying Training School, which had been known as No. 1 Service Flying Training School under the wartime Empire Air Training Scheme and disbanded in 1944, was re-established at RAAF Station Point Cook, Victoria. Responsible at that stage for all flight instruction of air cadets, its aircraft initially included one Avro Anson, two De Havilland Tiger Moths, and 55 CAC Wirraways. In response to demands for more aircrew to fulfil Australia's commitments to the Korean War and Malayan Emergency, RAAF flying training underwent significant change in 1951–52. No. 1 Initial Flying Training School was raised at Archerfield, Queensland, to impart students with general aeronautical and military knowledge, after which they received flight grading on Tiger Moths. Graduates went on to the newly formed No. 1 Basic Flying Training School (No. 1 BFTS) at Uranquinty, New South Wales, where they underwent further instruction, first on Tiger Moths and then on Wirraways. Finally they transferred to No. 1 FTS, which was renamed No. 1 Applied Flying Training School (No. 1 AFTS) in March 1952, for advanced instruction and combat training on Wirraways.

In May 1958, No. 1 AFTS relocated to RAAF Base Pearce, Western Australia, to re-equip with De Havilland Vampire jet trainers. Pearce's long runway made it more suitable for jet operations than the airfield at Point Cook. No. 1 AFTS's place at Point Cook was taken by No. 1 BFTS, which transferred from Uranquinty. Fourteen Vampires were delivered to Pearce by July, and all fourteen students on the first course at No. 1 AFTS graduated at the end of the year, making them the first RAAF cadets to do so on jet aircraft. In addition to flying training, the school was responsible for search and rescue operations off the West Australian coast, utilising C-47 Dakotas that were later augmented by a UH-1 Iroquois helicopter. By the mid-1960s, the aging Vampires were increasingly prone to system failures and the RAAF began evaluating replacements. A team led by Air Commodore Brian Eaton selected the Italian Macchi MB-326H as the RAAF's new jet trainer, as it met all requirements, could be licence-built by the Commonwealth Aircraft Corporation in Australia, and was relatively inexpensive. It began replacing the Vampires of No. 1 AFTS in May 1968.

=== Reformation and recent years as No. 2 FTS ===
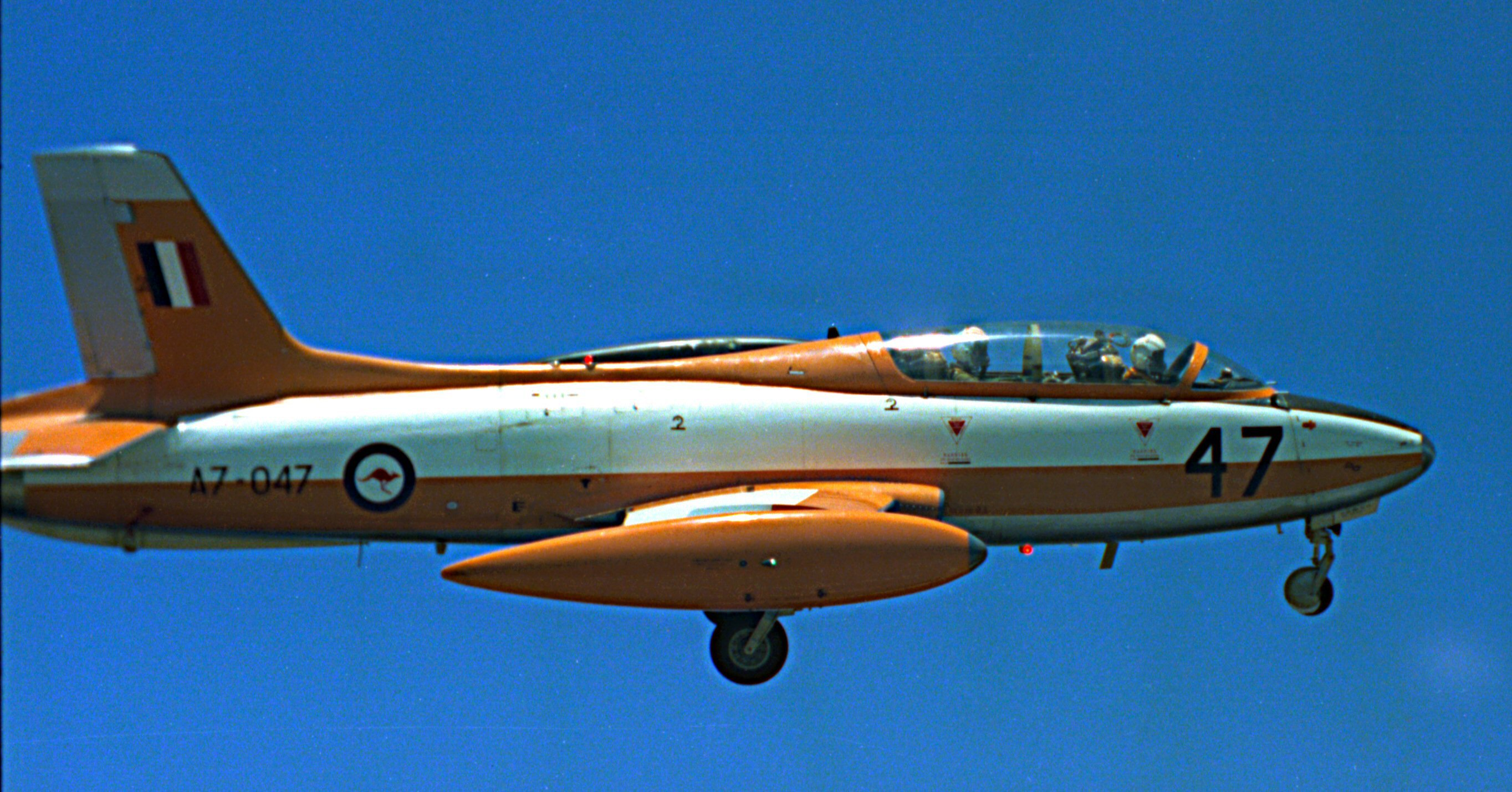
RAAF Macchi MB-326 trainer off Fremantle, Western Australia, in 1980

On 31 December 1968, No. 1 AFTS was disbanded at Pearce, reforming as No. 2 Flying Training School (No. 2 FTS) on 1 January 1969. At the same time, No. 1 BFTS was disbanded at Point Cook and reformed there as No. 1 FTS. The first Macchi course at No. 2 FTS graduated in September the same year. By this time the Vampires had all been retired and ground staff were fully dedicated to work on the Italian jets, which nevertheless proved a more challenging proposition to maintain than its predecessor. The introduction of the Macchi led to a brief flirtation with "all-through jet training" in the Air Force between 1969 and 1971, as it was expected to reduce the time necessary to turn out high-quality aviators. The practice was dropped after ten courses, being labelled "an expensive way of finding out that some pupils lacked the aptitude to become military pilots".

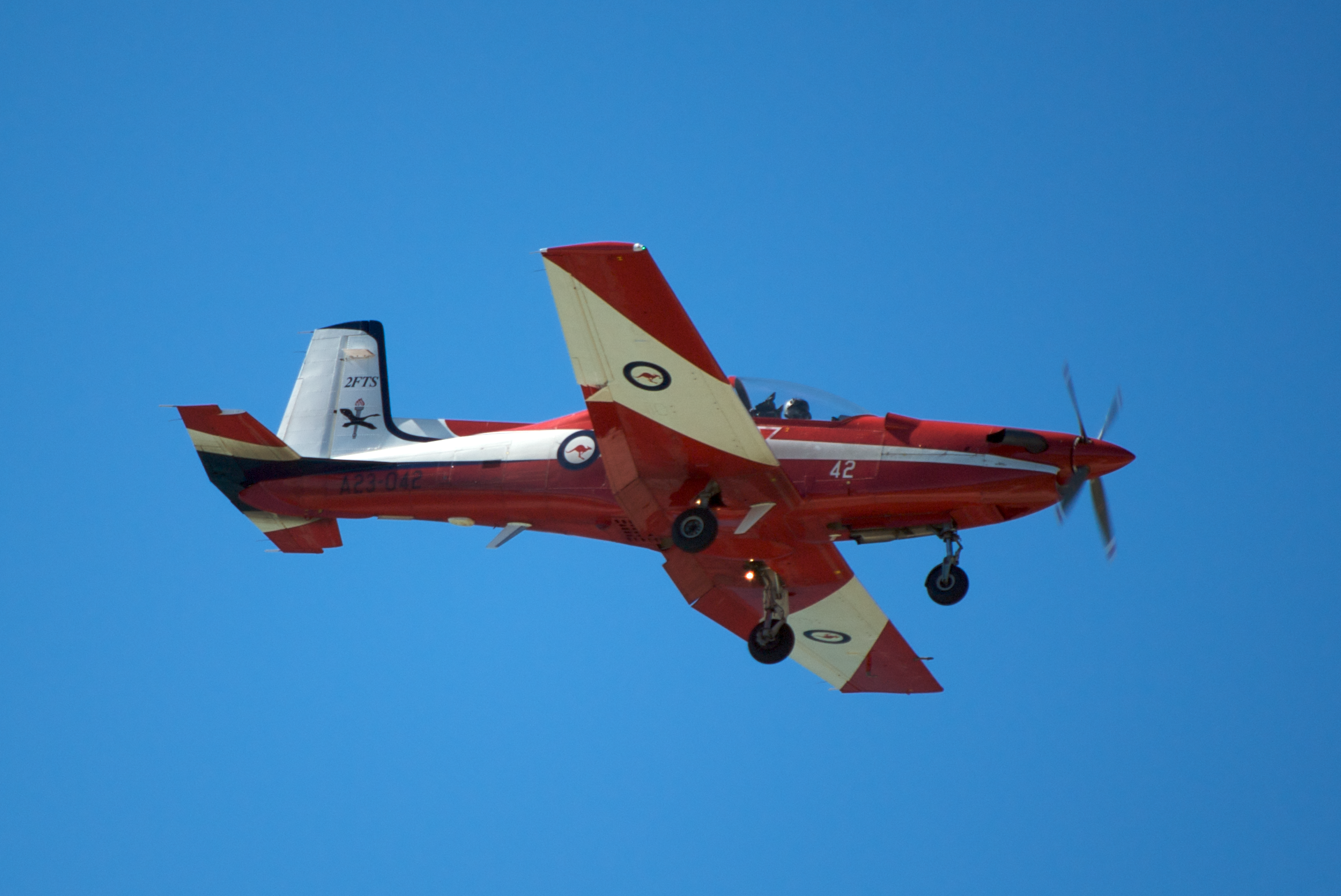
No. 2 FTS Pilatus PC-9 in 2008

The school began replacing its Macchis with Pilatus PC-9 turboprop trainers in July 1989, the process being completed in September 1991. The jets continued to be operated by Pearce's No. 25 Squadron; some of No. 2 FTS's PC-9s also served temporarily with the squadron as fatigue issues took their toll on the Macchis. As the CT-4A Airtrainers of Point Cook were phased out and No. 1 FTS disbanded in 1992–93, all-through flight training on the PC-9 began. Since 2006, No. 2 FTS has been under the command of Air Training Wing, a component of Air Force Training Group, headquartered at RAAF Williams Laverton Base. RAAF and RAN pilots undertake a 34-week training course at the school, following their ab initio instruction on CT-4B Airtrainers at the Australian Defence Force Basic Flying Training School in Tamworth, New South Wales.
