= No. 1 Flying Training School RAAF =

Royal Australian Air Force training unit

- No. 1 Flying Training School's crest, "a pair of elevated wings vol conjoined surmounted by the torch of learning inflamed"
- Active: 1921–1944; 1946–1993; 2019–current
- Country: Australia
- Branch: Royal Australian Air Force
- Role: Flying training
- Part of: Air Force Training Group
- Garrison/HQ: RAAF Point Cook (1921–1944); RAAF Station Uranquinty (1946–1947); RAAF Station Point Cook (1947–1958); RAAF Base Pearce (1958–1969); RAAF Base Point Cook (1969–1993); RAAF Base East Sale (2019–current)
- Mottos: Cogito ergo sum ("I think, therefore I am")

Commanders
- Notable commanders: William Anderson (1921, 1925–1926); Frank McNamara (1922–1925, 1930–1933); Adrian Cole (1926–1929); Hippolyte De La Rue (1933–1937); Frank Lukis (1938–1939); John McCauley (1940–1941); Roy King (1941); Charles Read (1943–1944, 1947–1949); Glen Cooper (1949–1951)

Aircraft flown
- Trainer: Pilatus PC-21

No. 1 Flying Training School (No. 1 FTS) is a school of the Royal Australian Air Force (RAAF). It is one of the Air Force's original units, dating back to the service's formation in 1921, when it was established at RAAF Point Cook, Victoria. By the early 1930s, the school comprised training, fighter, and seaplane components. It was re-formed several times in the ensuing years, initially as No. 1 Service Flying Training School (No. 1 SFTS) in 1940, under the wartime Empire Air Training Scheme. After graduating nearly 3,000 pilots, No. 1 SFTS was disbanded in late 1944, when there was no further requirement to train Australian aircrew for service in Europe.

The school was re-established in 1946 as No. 1 FTS at RAAF Station Uranquinty, New South Wales, and transferred to Point Cook the following year. Under a restructure of flying training to cope with the demands of the Korean War and Malayan Emergency, No. 1 FTS was re-formed in 1952 as No. 1 Applied Flying Training School (No. 1 AFTS); it moved to RAAF Base Pearce, Western Australia, in 1958. For much of this period the school was also responsible for training the RAAF's air traffic controllers. Its pilot trainees included Army, Navy, and foreign students as well as RAAF personnel. The RAAF's reorganisation of aircrew training in the early 1950s had led to the formation at Uranquinty of No. 1 Basic Flying Training School (No. 1 BFTS), which transferred to Point Cook in 1958. In 1969, No. 1 AFTS was re-formed as No. 2 Flying Training School and No. 1 BFTS was re-formed as No. 1 FTS. Rationalisation of RAAF flying training resulted in the disbandment of No. 1 FTS in 1993.

A re-formed No. 1 FTS began conducting ab initio flight training on the Pilatus PC-21 at RAAF Base East Sale in 2019.

== History ==
=== Early years ===
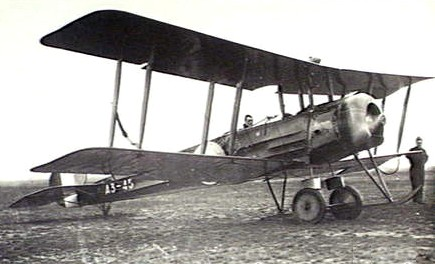
Avro 504K of No. 1 FTS, July 1926

No. 1 Flying Training School (No. 1 FTS) was the first unit to be formally established as part of the new Australian Air Force on 31 March 1921 (the term "Royal" was added in August that year). No. 1 FTS was formed from the remnants of Australia's original military flying unit, Central Flying School, at RAAF Point Cook, Victoria. Squadron Leader William Anderson, who was also in charge of the Point Cook base, was No. 1 FTS's first commanding officer. The school's initial complement of staff was twelve officers and 67 airmen.

In December 1921, the Australian Air Board prepared to form its first five squadrons and allocate aircraft to each, as well as to the nascent flying school. The plan was for No. 1 FTS to receive twelve Avro 504Ks and four Sopwith Pups, and the squadrons a total of eight Royal Aircraft Factory S.E.5s, eight Airco DH.9s, and three Fairey IIIs. Funding problems forced the Air Force to disband the newly raised squadrons on 1 July 1922 and re-form them as flights in a composite squadron under No. 1 FTS. The same month, Flight Lieutenant Frank McNamara, VC, took command of the school.

The inaugural flying course commenced in January 1923. Basic instruction took place on the Avro 504Ks, and more advanced or specialised training on the school's other aircraft. Fourteen students commenced the year-long course, and twelve graduated. As well as flying, they studied aeronautics, communications, navigation, armament and general military subjects. Squadron Leader Anderson resumed command of No. 1 FTS in 1925; the following year he handed over to Wing Commander Adrian Cole, who led the unit until 1929. The first Citizen Air Force (active reserve) pilots' course ran from December 1925 to March 1926, 26 of 30 students completing the training. Although 24 accidents occurred, there were no fatalities, leading Cole to remark at the graduation ceremony that the students were either made of India rubber or had learned how to crash "moderately safely". The 1926 Permanent Air Force (PAF) cadet course was marred by three fatal accidents. The following year, 29 students graduated—thirteen PAF, nine reserve, and seven destined for exchange with the Royal Air Force (RAF). In June 1928, the school's Avro 504Ks were replaced by de Havilland DH.60 Cirrus Moths; these were augmented by Gipsy Moths commencing in 1930.

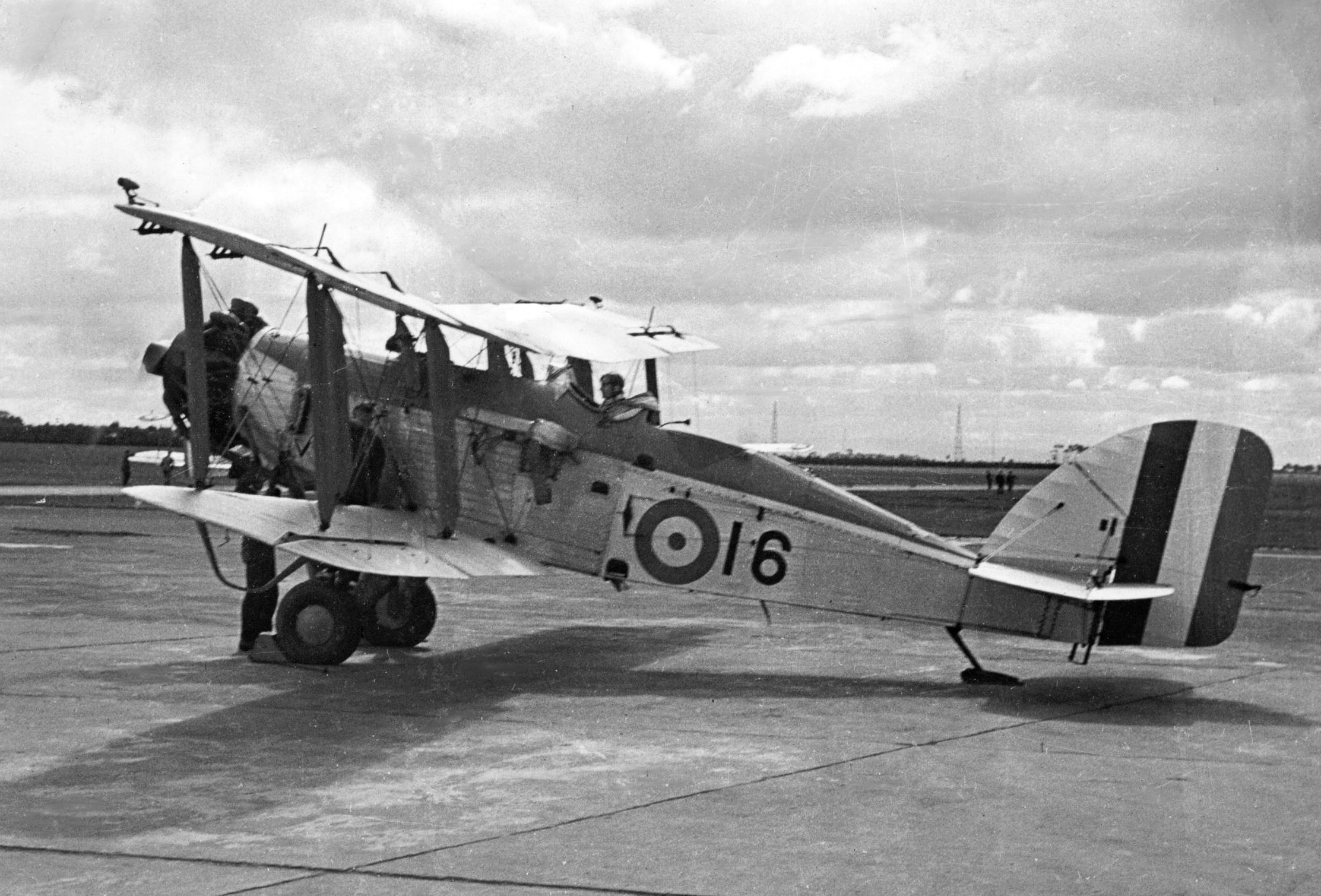
A cadet prepares for a solo training flight in a Westland Wapiti at No. 1 FTS, Point Cook, 1938

Squadron Leader McNamara resumed command of No. 1 FTS in October 1930. By then, two sub-units had been raised at Point Cook under the school's auspices: "Fighter Squadron", operating Bristol Bulldogs; and "Seaplane Squadron", operating Supermarine Southamptons, among other types. As of February 1934, No. 1 FTS was organised into Training Squadron, operating Moths and Westland Wapitis, Fighter Squadron and Seaplane Squadron. Fighter and Seaplane Squadrons were formally established as units that month, but remained under the control of the flying school and were "really little more than flights", according to the official history of the pre-war RAAF. As well as participating in training exercises, Fighter Squadron was often employed for aerobatic displays and flag-waving duties. One of No. 1 FTS's leading instructors during the early 1930s, Flight Lieutenant Frederick Scherger, was also a flight commander in Fighter Squadron. Seaplane Squadron undertook naval co-operation and survey tasks, as well as seaplane training. Fighter Squadron was dissolved in December 1935 when its Bulldogs were transferred to No. 1 Squadron at RAAF Laverton; Seaplane Squadron continued to function until June 1939, when it was separated to form the nucleus of No. 10 Squadron.

In 1932, No. 1 FTS started running two courses each year, the first commencing in January and the second in July; it also ceased graduating non-commissioned officers as pilots, and thus took on a character resembling the other armed services' cadet colleges, the Royal Australian Naval College and the Royal Military College, Duntroon. The roughly 1,200 applications for each flying course competed for around twelve places. Wing Commander Hippolyte De La Rue became commanding officer in early 1933. The following year, No. 1 FTS commenced regular courses in signals, photography, air observation, and aircraft maintenance. In April 1936, the school took delivery of its first Avro Cadets, procured as an intermediate trainer to bridge the gap between the Gipsy Moth employed for elementary flying instruction and the Wapiti used for advanced training. De La Rue was succeeded by Wing Commander Frank Lukis in January 1938. By this time the school was training up to 96 new pilots per year, a small percentage of whom were slated for secondment to the RAF on short-service commissions. Link Trainer simulators were introduced in March 1939.

=== World War II ===
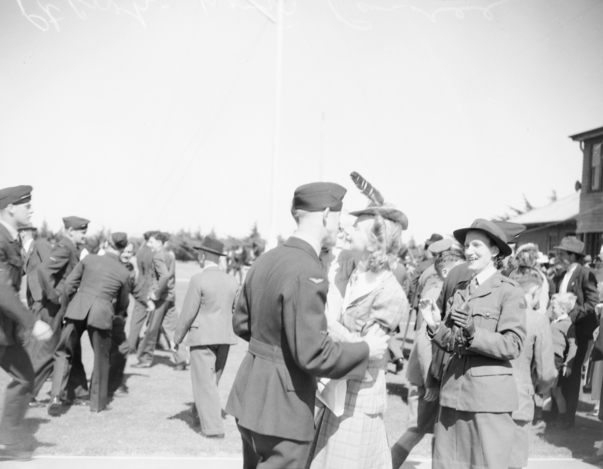
RAAF aircrew with family and friends after graduation at No. 1 SFTS, December 1943

RAAF flying training was heavily reorganised soon after the outbreak of World War II, in response to Australia's participation in the Empire Air Training Scheme (EATS). Several elementary flying training schools were formed, to provide basic flight instruction to cadets; more advanced pilot instruction was to take place at service flying training schools. On 1 May 1940, No. 1 FTS was re-formed at Point Cook as No. 1 Service Flying Training School (No. 1 SFTS). Its inaugural commanding officer was Group Captain John Summers, who led Fighter Squadron in the early 1930s and had taken over No. 1 FTS in December 1939. The school's Instructors' Training Squadron was detached to become the nucleus of a re-formed Central Flying School, which relocated to Camden, New South Wales, in June. Courses at the service flying training schools consisted of two streams, intermediate and advanced; the total duration varied during the war as demand for aircrew fluctuated. Initially running for sixteen weeks, the course was cut to ten weeks (which included 75 hours flying time) in October 1940. A year later it was raised to twelve weeks (including 100 hours flying time), and again to sixteen weeks two months later. It continued to increase after this, peaking at 28 weeks in June 1944.

No. 1 SFTS came under the control of Southern Area Command, headquartered in Melbourne. The school's complement of 52 aircraft included Wapitis, Cadets, Avro Ansons, Hawker Demons, and a de Havilland Tiger Moth. Group Captain John McCauley served as commanding officer from October 1940 until July 1941, when he handed over to Wing Commander Roy King, who went on to take charge of Station Headquarters Point Cook in October. As of July, No. 1 SFTS was operating more than 100 aircraft, including Gipsy Moths, de Havilland DH.89 Dragon Rapides, Douglas C-47 Dakotas, CAC Wirraways and Airspeed Oxfords, the last two being the mainstays. In August 1941, control of all training units in Victoria passed from Southern Area Command to the newly formed No. 1 Training Group. By September, the school had an establishment of 100 officers and over 2,000 airmen, including 300 cadets. It was organised into Intermediate Training Squadron, Advanced Training Squadron, Maintenance Wing, Armament School, and Signal School. Wing Commander Charles Read held command of No. 1 SFTS from October 1943 until its disbandment on 15 September 1944, by which time almost 3,000 pilots had graduated. Among these were Nicky Barr, who became one of Australia's leading fighter aces in North Africa, and Bill Newton, awarded the Victoria Cross for bombing raids in New Guinea. The RAAF had ordered the school's closure in August 1944 as part of a general reduction in aircrew training, after being informed by the British Air Ministry that it no longer required EATS graduates for the war in Europe. Significant reserves of trained Commonwealth aircrew had been built up in the UK early in 1944 before the invasion of Normandy, but lower-than-anticipated casualties had resulted in an over-supply that by 30 June numbered 3,000 Australians.

=== Cold War ===
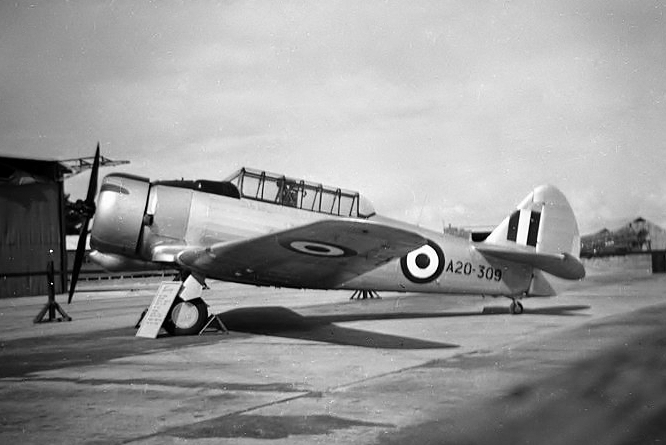
Wirraway trainer, c. 1950s

On 1 March 1946, No. 5 Service Flying Training School at RAAF Station Uranquinty, New South Wales, was re-formed as No. 1 FTS, under Southern Area Command. Its complement of aircraft included one Anson, two Tiger Moths, and 55 Wirraways, though the unit was mainly responsible for the maintenance of equipment and little flying was undertaken apart from refresher courses for pilots posting to the British Commonwealth Occupation Force in Japan. By 1 September 1947, No. 1 FTS had transferred to Point Cook, initially as "Flying Training School", under Wing Commander Read. The RAAF's first post-war flying training course at the school consisted of 42 students and commenced in February 1948, finishing in August the following year. Flight grading took place after six months of general military training, at which point students were selected to be trainee pilots or navigators; the former remained at No. 1 FTS, and the latter transferred to the School of Air Navigation at RAAF Base East Sale, Victoria. Unlike some other air forces, which placed students into specialised aircraft roles after basic training, the RAAF's philosophy was to give all pilots essentially the same training from induction to graduation, so they would be able to convert more easily from one aircraft type to another as operational requirements evolved. In September 1949, Read handed over to Squadron Leader Glen Cooper, who commanded the school until August 1951.

In response to demands for more aircrew to fulfil Australia's commitments to the Korean War and Malayan Emergency, flying training underwent major changes in 1951–52, the syllabus at No. 1 FTS being split among three separately located units. No. 1 Initial Flying Training School (No. 1 IFTS) was raised at RAAF Station Archerfield, Queensland, to impart students with general aeronautical and military knowledge, after which they received their flight grading during twelve hours on Tiger Moths. Graduate pilots of No. 1 IFTS went on to the newly formed No. 1 Basic Flying Training School (No. 1 BFTS) at Uranquinty, where they underwent a further 90 hours of aerial instruction that included instrument, formation and night flying, first on Tiger Moths and then on Wirraways. Successful students finally transferred to No. 1 FTS, which was renamed No. 1 Applied Flying Training School (No. 1 AFTS) in March 1952. There they undertook 100 flying hours of advanced weapons and combat training on Wirraways, before graduating as sergeant pilots. RAAF College, formed at Point Cook in 1947, was to be the Air Force's primary source of commissioned officers. The Tiger Moths and Wirraways of No. 1 BFTS were subsequently replaced by the CAC Winjeel, first delivered in 1955.

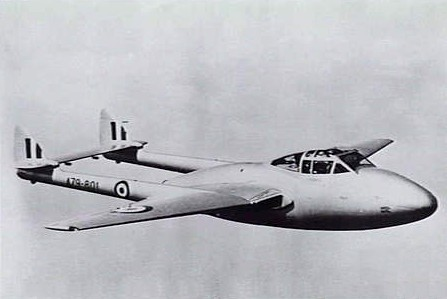
Vampire jet trainer, 1950s

By the time it was re-formed as No. 1 AFTS, the flying school at Point Cook had also been made responsible for training the RAAF's air traffic controllers; this role was transferred to Central Flying School at East Sale in December 1956. Southern Area Command was re-formed as Training Command in September 1953. On 28 May 1958, No. 1 AFTS relocated to RAAF Base Pearce, Western Australia, where its Wirraways were replaced by de Havilland Vampire jet trainers, which required a runway longer than that at Point Cook. The school's place at Point Cook was taken by No. 1 BFTS, which transferred from Uranquinty on 19 December. By this time the RAAF had decided to commission all pilots and navigators, who would be selected for these roles upon induction into the service; navigators therefore went straight to the School of Air Navigation at East Sale, without attending flying training school. On 31 December 1958, the Flying Training Squadron of RAAF College was disbanded, and the flight instruction component of the four-year cadet course became the responsibility of No. 1 BFTS (for basic training) and No. 1 AFTS (for advanced training). Previously, the cadets had used FTS aircraft under RAAF College instructors, but from 1959 their flight training was fully integrated with the FTS system.

The demand for trained aircrew, which had lessened in the mid-1950s, rose again the following decade as a result of the RAAF embarking on a major re-equipment program, and Australia's increasing involvement in the Vietnam War. The RAAF also had an ongoing commitment to providing flying training to students from the Australian Army and Royal Australian Navy. By adding instructors and increasing the ratio of pupils to instructors, the number of Air Force graduates was progressively raised from 38 in 1963, to 100 in 1968. Also in 1968, Macchi MB-326H jet trainers began replacing the Vampires of No. 1 AFTS. The introduction of the Macchi led to a brief flirtation with "all-through" jet training in the Air Force, consisting of 210 hours on this one type of aircraft. The experiment was dropped after two courses as being, in the words of the official historian of the post-war RAAF, "an expensive way of finding out that some pupils lacked the aptitude to become military pilots"; by 1971 students were receiving 60 hours of basic training on Winjeels at Point Cook, and the Maachi course at Pearce was reduced to 150 hours. On 31 December 1968, No. 1 AFTS was disbanded at Pearce, re-forming on 1 January 1969 as No. 2 Flying Training School . At the same time, No. 1 BFTS was disbanded at Point Cook and re-formed as No. 1 FTS.

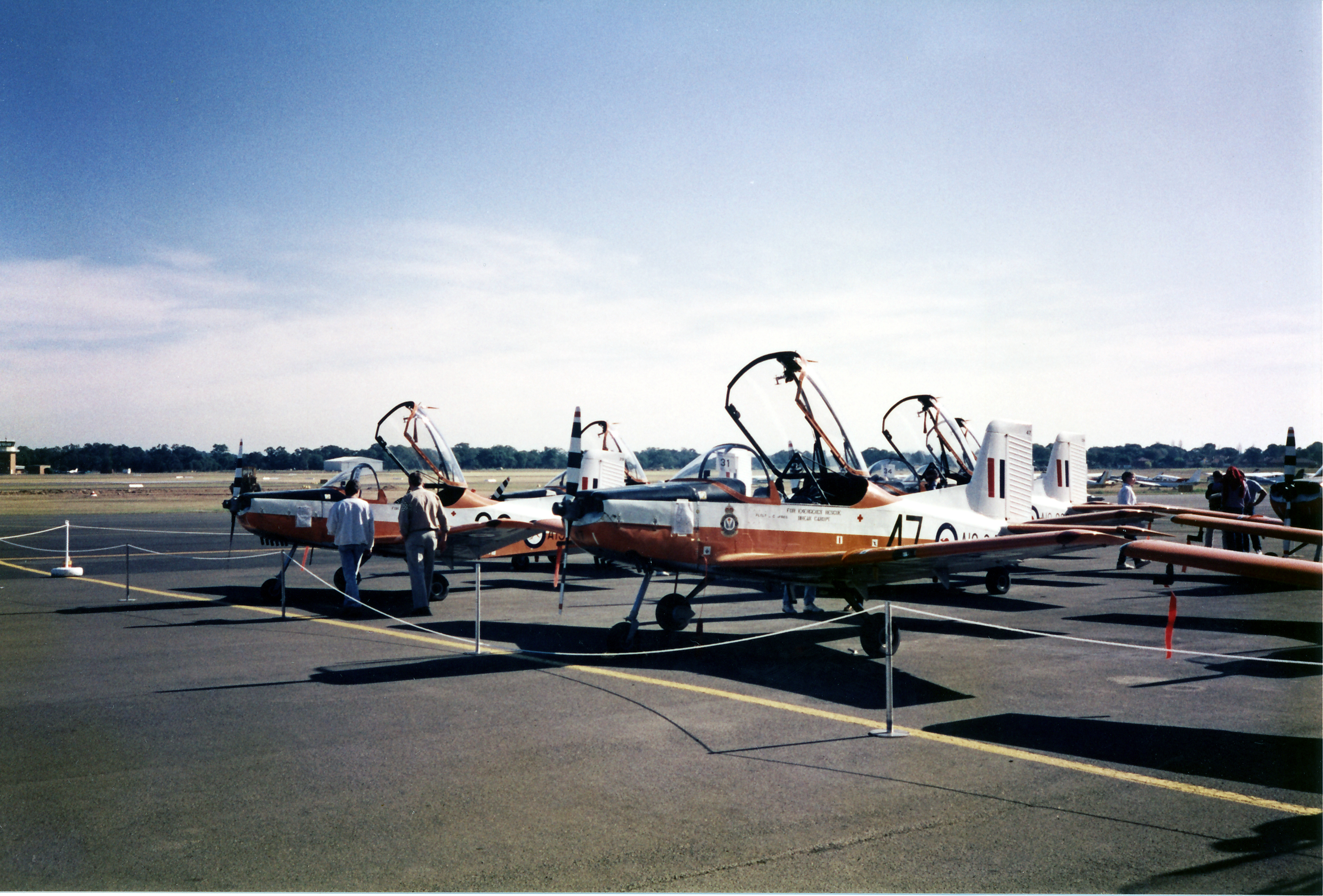
CT-4 trainers lined up for auction at Bankstown Airport, following the closure of No. 1 FTS in 1993

The Winjeels of No. 1 FTS were replaced by CT-4A Airtrainers in late 1975. The first CT-4 pilots' course of 34 students included six from the Royal Australian Navy and three from Malaysia. By 1977, the school was organised into Air Training, Ground Training and Maintenance Squadrons. As well as maintaining its own aircraft, it was responsible for technical support of other units at Point Cook. The Queen's Colour was presented to No. 1 FTS by the Governor-General, Sir Zelman Cowen, in 1981. In November 1989, one of the school's CT-4s re-created the first trans-Australia flight that had taken place 70 years before, when Captain Henry Wrigley and Sergeant Arthur "Spud" Murphy flew a Royal Aircraft Factory B.E.2 biplane from Point Cook to Darwin, Northern Territory, between 16 November and 12 December 1919.

A review of undergraduate flying training, commissioned by the Chief of the Air Staff (CAS), Air Marshal Ray Funnell, and aimed at reducing failure rates and improving cost-effectiveness, saw the retirement of the CT-4s in December 1992, followed by the closure of No. 1 FTS. The last RAAF flying course completed on 12 June 1992, and the last Army pilots' course in December. The school was disbanded on 31 January 1993, bringing to an end almost 80 years of military flying training at Point Cook, Australia's oldest military air base. Concurrent with the phase-out of training at No. 1 FTS, British Aerospace was contracted to conduct flight grading at its base in Tamworth, New South Wales. Subsequent all-through flight training on the Pilatus PC-9 took place at No. 2 FTS, Pearce. In 1998, British Aerospace was granted a contract to supply tri-service basic flying instruction at the newly formed Australian Defence Force Basic Flying Training School (ADFBFTS) in Tamworth, the first course commencing in January 1999 on CT-4B Airtrainers, and No. 2 FTS again became responsible for advanced flying training only. ADFBFTS thus became, according to the school's head of training, "the No. 1 Flying Training School you have when you don't have a No. 1 Flying Training School".

=== Reactivation ===
With the disbandment of the ADFBFTS, a re-formed No. 1 FTS began conducting basic flying training on the Pilatus PC-21 at RAAF Base East Sale in 2019. The first course commenced on 14 January, and ten students graduated on 12 July. The school came under the control of Air Academy, part of Air Force Training Group.

In December 2023, No. 1 FTS commenced "all-through" pilot training with its inaugural intermediate flying training course of nine students. This course graduated with wings in June 2024 and signified the first time Royal Australian Air Force pilots have conducted all their flying training at No. 1 FTS since the Korean War. In December 2024, the first Royal Australian Navy pilot graduated from the all-through course at No. 1 FTS.
