= No. 1 Basic Flying Training School RAAF =

No. 1 Basic Flying Training School
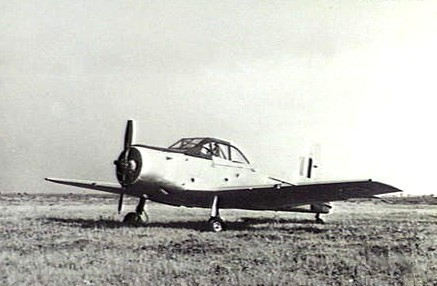
- CAC Winjeel prototype, No. 1 Basic Flying Training School, 1953
- Active: 1951–69
- Allegiance: Australia
- Branch: Royal Australian Air Force
- Role: Basic flying training
- Garrison/HQ: RAAF Base Uranquinty (1951–58); RAAF Base Point Cook (1958–69)
- Motto(s): "Knowledge Is Power"

No. 1 Basic Flying Training School (No. 1 BFTS) was a flying training school of the Royal Australian Air Force (RAAF). Along with No. 1 Initial Flying Training School (No. 1 IFTS), it was formed in response to increased demand for aircrew during the Korean War and Malayan Emergency. No. 1 BFTS was established in December 1951 at RAAF Base Uranquinty, New South Wales, where it operated de Havilland Tiger Moths and CAC Wirraways. The school absorbed the activities of No. 1 IFTS in January 1955, as aircrew training requirements had eased following the end of the Korean War. No. 1 BFTS moved to RAAF Base Point Cook, Victoria, in May 1958, by which time it was exclusively flying CAC Winjeels. Its training program expanded in the mid-1960s owing to Australia's commitments in the Vietnam War. No. 1 BFTS was re-formed as No. 1 Flying Training School at Point Cook in January 1969.

== History ==
Prior to World War II, all pilot training in the Royal Australian Air Force (RAAF) was conducted under the auspices of one unit, No. 1 Flying Training School (No. 1 FTS), at RAAF Point Cook, Victoria. With the dramatic expansion of aircrew training under the wartime Empire Air Training Scheme, No. 1 FTS was supplanted in 1940–41 by twelve elementary flying training schools (EFTS) and eight service flying training schools (SFTS). Post-war rationalisation saw all the EFTSs and SFTSs disbanded. No. 1 FTS, re-formed using the personnel and equipment of No. 5 Service Flying Training School in Uranquinty, New South Wales, returned to Point Cook and again became the RAAF's sole facility for training new pilots.

=== Formation at Uranquinty ===
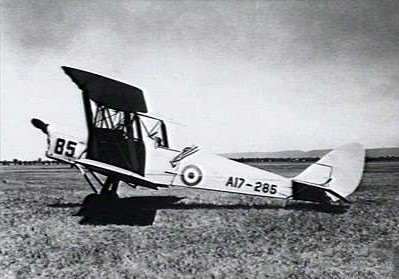
De Havilland Tiger Moth, the RAAF's basic trainer from 1940 until supplanted by the Winjeel in 1956–57

In response to demands for more aircrew to meet Australia's commitments to the Korean War and Malayan Emergency, flying training in the RAAF was again expanded in 1951–52, resulting in the functions of No. 1 FTS being split among three separately located units. No. 1 FTS itself was renamed No. 1 Applied Flying Training School (No. 1 AFTS) in March 1952, and assumed responsibility for advanced weapons and combat training on CAC Wirraways. Meanwhile, in November 1951, No. 1 Initial Flying Training School (No. 1 IFTS) was raised at RAAF Station Archerfield, Queensland, to impart students with general aeronautical and military knowledge, after which they received their flight grading during twelve hours on de Havilland Tiger Moths. Graduate pilots of No. 1 IFTS went on to another new unit, No. 1 Basic Flying Training School (No. 1 BFTS) at RAAF Base Uranquinty, New South Wales, where they underwent further aerial instruction that included instrument, formation and night flying, as well as aerobatics and navigation. The first part of their training at No. 1 BFTS included 40 hours on Tiger Moths, after which they would fly 50 hours on Wirraways. Successful students finally transferred to No. 1 AFTS, before graduating as sergeant pilots.

When No. 1 BFTS formed at Uranquinty on 1 December 1951, it had 377 staff, 37 Tiger Moths and 37 Wirraways, and came under the control of Headquarters Southern Area (Training Command from 1 October 1953). The first pilots' course commenced on 1 April 1952, and graduated on 1 August. The first course of graduates from No. 1 IFTS transferred in the same month. As well as RAAF pilots, No. 1 BFTS trained students from the Australian Army and the Royal Australian Navy's Fleet Air Arm. In February 1953, a prototype CAC Winjeel, designed and manufactured in Australia, arrived at the school to undergo trials. From January 1956 to February 1957, the Winjeel gradually replaced both the Tiger Moth and the Wirraway as No. 1 BFTS's training aircraft. As well as these aircraft, Link Trainer instrument flying simulators were employed at the school. By November 1954, following the end of the Korean War, the RAAF's need for further aircrew to fulfill its international obligations had eased and the decision was made to combine the syllabus of No. 1 IFTS with No. 1 BFTS starting in January 1955, after which No. 1 IFTS was disbanded.

=== Relocation to Point Cook ===
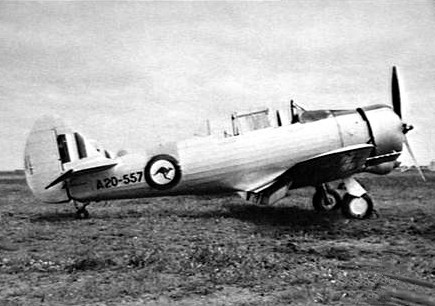
Wirraway trainer, which was also employed at No. 1 BFTS until replaced by the Winjeel

In May 1958, No. 1 AFTS relocated to RAAF Base Pearce, Western Australia, to re-equip with de Havilland Vampire jet trainers. Its place at RAAF Base Point Cook was taken by No. 1 BFTS, which transferred from Uranquinty. RAAF Base Uranquinty closed on 18 December 1958, and No. 1 BFTS commenced operations at Point Cook the following day. Trainee pilots could now expect to fly approximately 85 hours on Winjeels at No. 1 BFTS, followed by 125 hours on Vampires at No. 1 AFTS, and gain a short-service commission as a pilot officer upon graduation. On 31 December 1958, the Flying Training Squadron at RAAF College, Point Cook, was closed, and graduates undertook their basic flying training at No. 1 BFTS. From 1961, cadets at the recently established RAAF Academy (successor to RAAF College) were given between 25 and 50 hours "motivational flying" at No. 1 BFTS, as practical relief from the "hard grind" of their four years of academic study. By mid-1964, the school had a staff of 182, including 22 flying instructors, and was operating 30 Winjeels. Students were flying 124 hours, including eight at night, over a 40-week course, and were generally expected to go solo after eight or nine hours in the air.

The pace of flying training increased in the mid-1960s as the RAAF expanded and enlisted more aircrew to fulfill Australia's commitment to the Vietnam War. According to Air Force historian Alan Stephens, "It was not uncommon for thirteen aircraft, some flown by inexperienced solo students, to be in the circuit simultaneously at Point Cook, creating something of a 'sink or swim' environment for the trainees". The ratio of students to instructors was generally around 3:1; junior instructors might fly four times a day, plus twice more when night training. By mid-1967, No. 1 BFTS had 34 instructors, was operating 40 aircraft, and was logging around 2,000 flying hours per month; its training program necessitated the use of as many as five other airstrips at the nearby RAAF Base Laverton and Bacchus Marsh, to augment the four runways at its home airfield in Point Cook. On 31 December 1968, No. 1 BFTS was disbanded at Point Cook, re-forming there as No. 1 FTS on 1 January 1969. At the same time, No. 1 AFTS was disbanded at Pearce and re-formed as No. 2 Flying Training School. Subsequent rationalisation of RAAF flying training saw the disbandment of No. 1 FTS at Point Cook on 31 January 1993. Initial flight grading and basic instruction has since been conducted by civilian contractors at the Australian Defence Force Basic Flying Training School.
