= No. 1 Initial Flying Training School RAAF =

No. 1 Initial Flying Training School
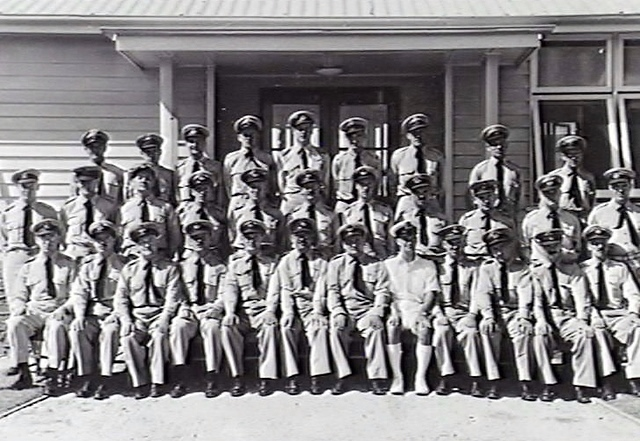
- No. 1 Initial Flying Training School staff, 1953
- Active: 1951–55
- Allegiance: Australia
- Branch: Royal Australian Air Force
- Role: Initial flying training
- Garrison/HQ: RAAF Station Archerfield

No. 1 Initial Flying Training School (No. 1 IFTS) was a flying training school of the Royal Australian Air Force (RAAF). It was formed in 1951 as No. 1 Initial Training School, in response to increased demand for aircrew during the Korean War and Malayan Emergency. Headquartered at RAAF Station Archerfield, Queensland, and operating de Havilland Tiger Moths, the unit was renamed No. 1 Initial Flying Training School in 1952. Ground staff from the school won the Hewitt Trophy for small arms proficiency in 1953. Aircrew training requirements eased following the end of the Korean War, and No. IFTS merged with No. 1 Basic Flying Training School at RAAF Base Uranquinty, New South Wales, in 1955.

== History ==
Prior to World War II, all aircrew training in the Royal Australian Air Force (RAAF) was conducted under the auspices of one unit, No. 1 Flying Training School (No. 1 FTS), at RAAF Point Cook, Victoria. With the dramatic expansion of pilot training under the wartime Empire Air Training Scheme, No. 1 FTS was supplanted in 1940–41 by twelve elementary flying training schools (EFTS) and eight service flying training schools (SFTS). Rationalisation as the war progressed and came to an end saw all the EFTSs and SFTSs disbanded. No. 1 FTS, re-formed using the personnel and equipment of No. 5 Service Flying Training School in Uranquinty, New South Wales, returned to Point Cook and again became the RAAF's sole facility for training new pilots.

In response to demands for more aircrew to fulfil Australia's commitments to the Korean War and Malayan Emergency, flying training in the RAAF was again expanded in 1951–52, with the functions of No. 1 FTS being split among three separately located units. On 28 November 1951, No. 1 Initial Training School (No. 1 ITS) was raised at RAAF Station Archerfield, Queensland, to impart students with general aeronautical and military knowledge, after which they received their flight grading during twelve hours on de Havilland Tiger Moths. Graduate pilots of No. 1 ITS went on to another new unit, No. 1 Basic Flying Training School (No. 1 BFTS) at RAAF Base Uranquinty, New South Wales, where they underwent further aerial instruction that included instrument, formation and night flying on Tiger Moths and CAC Wirraways. Successful students finally transferred to No. 1 FTS, which was renamed No. 1 Applied Flying Training School in March 1952, for advanced weapons and combat training on Wirraways, before graduating as sergeant pilots.

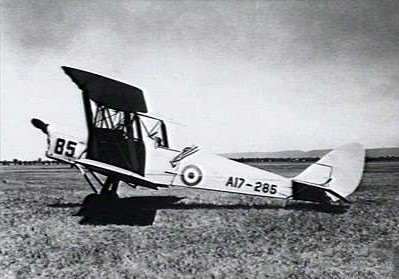
RAAF de Havilland Tiger Moth

No. 1 ITS's inaugural commanding officer was Wing Commander Wilfred Lampe. Tiger Moths began arriving at Archerfield on 4 January 1952, and the first course commenced two days later. It graduated on 27 March, having flown a total of some 1,000 hours. The unit was renamed No. 1 Initial Flying Training School on 28 May. As well as RAAF pilots, the school trained students from the Royal Australian Navy's Fleet Air Arm, and gave Air Training Corps cadets flying experience. Six of its Tiger Moths went on a recruiting drive around Kingaroy and Bundaberg in August 1952, the same month that its first graduates commenced the next phase of their training at No. 1 BFTS. Those students selected to be navigators rather than pilots went on to the School of Air Navigation at RAAF Base East Sale, Victoria. No. 1 IFTS was responsible for staging aerial pageants as part of Air Force Week in September 1952, and again in September 1953. Ground staff from the school won the Hewitt Trophy for small arms proficiency held at Liverpool, New South Wales, in December 1953. In April 1954, the Tiger Moths practised bombing and strafing troops in an exercise with the Australian Army's 9th Battalion.

By November 1954, following the end of the Korean War, the RAAF's need for further aircrew to help meet the Australian military's international obligations had eased and the decision was made to combine the syllabus of No. 1 IFTS with No. 1 BFTS starting in the new year. No. 1 IFTS was disbanded on 24 January 1955, and its base facilities handed over to No. 23 Squadron.
