= Maroochy air crash =

Aviation incident on Saturday 30 December 1950

Coordinates: 26°39.533′S 153°06.195′E

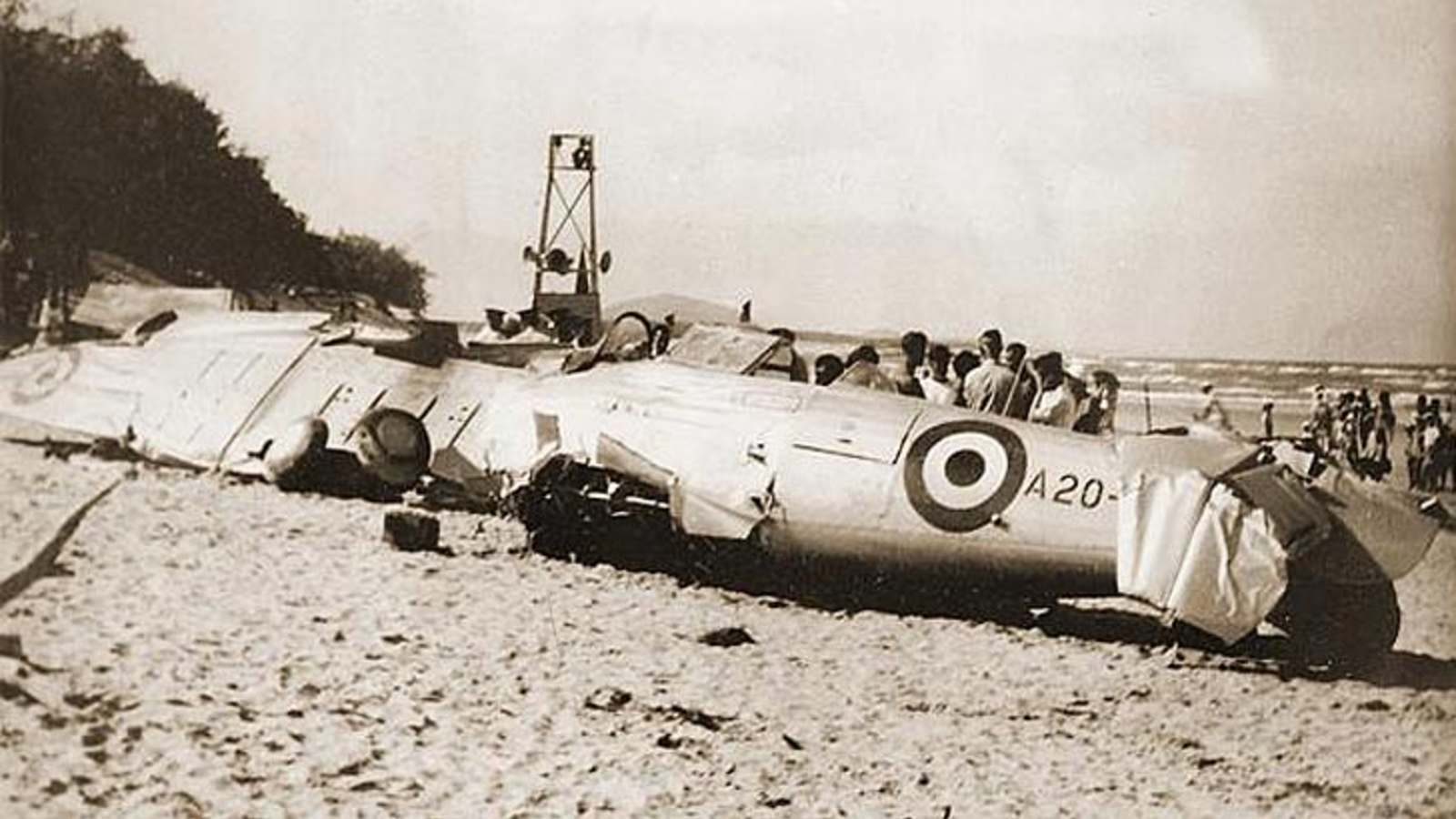
- wreckage of A20-212

Occurrence
- Date: 30 December 1950
- Summary: Beach air crash
- Site: Maroochydore, Queensland, Australia

Aircraft
- Aircraft type: CAC Wirraway
- Operator: Royal Australian Air Force
- Registration: A20-212
- Flight origin: Redcliffe, Queensland
- Destination: Noosa, Queensland
- Passengers: 0
- Crew: 2
- Fatalities: 0
- Survivors: 2

Ground casualties
- Ground fatalities: 3
- Ground injuries: 14

The Maroochy air crash was an aircraft accident that occurred at 11.10am on 30 December 1950 at Maroochydore beach, Queensland, Australia. Three children were killed and fourteen others were seriously injured as a result of the accident.

CAC Wirraway Serial Number A20-212 of the Royal Australian Air Force had been circling between Maroochydore and Alexandra Headland during a routine shark patrol when it suddenly banked steeply and crashed onto the crowded beach in front of the Maroochydore Surf Life Saving Club. The pilot and his observer survived the crash.

== Cause ==
Two coronial inquiries failed to attribute any blame for the crash. In 2013, a Queensland coroner overturned the findings of previous inquiries and ruled it was pilot error that caused the crash, siting his use of an unsuitable aircraft, which was known to stall at low speeds, and lack of training in surf patrol duties.

== Memorials ==
On 9 March 2013, a 2.4-metre 'Maroochy Air Crash Memorial' was erected at the site in memory of those killed and injured.
