= Australian Defence Force Basic Flying Training School =

Basic Flight Training School
- Active: 1993-2019
- Disbanded: February 2019
- Country: Australia
- Branch: Royal Australian Air Force
- Role: Flight Training
- Garrison/HQ: Tamworth Regional Airport
- Motto(s): Cogito Ergo Sum

Aircraft flown
- Trainer: CT-4 B Airtrainer

The Australian Defence Force Basic Flying Training School (BFTS) was located in Tamworth in northern New South Wales. It was run by BAE Systems Flying Training Academy, which conducted tri-service flight screening and basic flying training for the Australian Defence Force (ADF) aircrew from the Australian Army, Royal Australian Navy (RAN) and the Royal Australian Air Force (RAAF) using CT-4 Airtrainer aircraft. It helped pilots gain basic knowledge about flying, it also had a 26 week basic flying simulation course.

BFTS was raised in response to the RAAF and RAN beginning all-through training on the Pilatus PC-9 in December 1992. in 1993, Headquarters Training Command Detachment A was raised in Tamworth consisting primarily of civilian instructors. Army students were trained here as the PC-9 course was not appropriate. The detachment also screened prospective military pilots at this time. BFTS was officially reformed in 1999 and quickly began tri-service training.

The training preceded streaming into single service flying training, with RAAF and RAN pilots having moved to No. 2 Flying Training School (2FTS) at RAAF Pearce, Western Australia while Army pilots undertook further training at the Australian School of Army Aviation in Oakey, Queensland. All flying training was conducted by the ADF with the provision of aircraft and support services from BAE Systems Tamworth. Flying instructors were from all three branches of the ADF with several civilian flying instructors from BAE. The school formed part of Air Training Wing RAAF.

In 2015, BAE Systems lost a contract bid to Lockheed Martin Australia for the ab-initio training of pilots. Training was transitioned to No. 1 Flying Training School (1FTS) on the Pilatus PC-21. The drawdown of training in Tamworth began in 2018 and the final ADF course graduated from BFTS in February 2019. In the years of operation, the school trained approximately 4000 military and flight screening students and operated over 280 000 flight hours. Flying training for the ADF is now conducted at 1FTS.

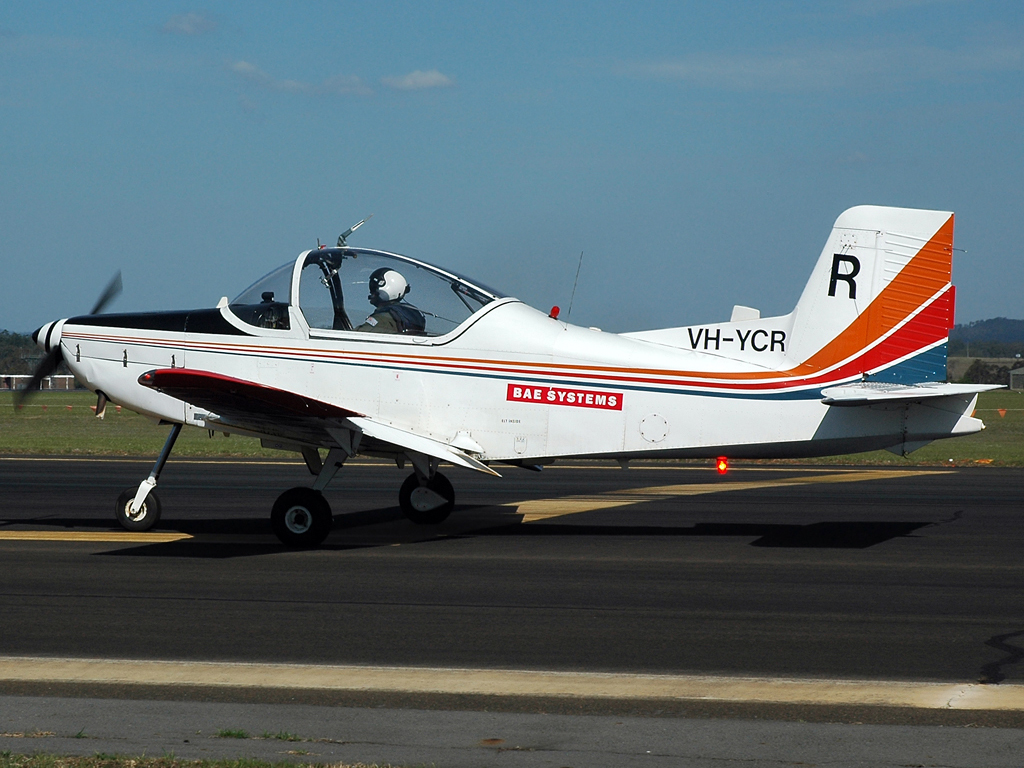
A BFTS Pacific Aerospace CT-4B Airtrainer at the 2008 Defence Force Air Show RAAF Base Amberley.

== Aircraft ==
Aircraft type	Variant	Origin	Role	Service period	Amount
Mudry CAP-10	CAP-10B	France	Two-seat aerobatic aircraft	2005-2019	Three aircraft
PAC CT/4 Airtrainer	CT/4B Airtrainer	New Zealand	Two-seat primary trainer aircraft	1991-2019	31 aircraft
Piper PA-34 Seneca	PA-34-220T	United States	Twin-engine light aircraft	2005-2019	Two aircraft
