= No. 23 Squadron RAAF =

Royal Australian Air Force squadron

- Badge
- Active: 3 May 1937 – current
- Branch: Royal Australian Air Force
- Role: Base operations and training
- Part of: Combat Support Group
- Garrison/HQ: RAAF Base Amberley
- Motto(s): "Dauntless"
- Battle honours: New Guinea 1944; Markham Valley 1944; Eastern Waters 1941–1945; Pacific 1941–1945; Borneo 1945

No. 23 (City of Brisbane) Squadron of the Royal Australian Air Force (RAAF) is a non-flying base operations and training squadron headquartered at RAAF Base Amberley near Brisbane, Queensland. The squadron was formed in 1937 and saw action against the Japanese during World War II as a bomber squadron. Operating from Archerfield during the early stages of the war, the squadron undertook maritime patrols off Australia's east coast before converting to a dive-bomber role and taking part in the New Guinea campaign. Later in the war, the squadron converted to Liberator heavy bombers and flew missions against Japanese targets in the Netherlands East Indies. After the war, No. 23 Squadron was used to reform No. 6 Squadron and was then re-raised as a Citizens Air Force unit based in Brisbane. Until 1960, the squadron flew jet fighter aircraft before converting to a ground support role and now forms part of the RAAF's Combat Support Group.

== History ==
No. 23 Squadron was first formed on 3 May 1937 at RAAF Base Laverton as a general purpose unit equipped with Avro Ansons and Hawker Demons. The squadron moved to RAAF Base Pearce in March 1938 and was renumbered No. 25 Squadron in January 1939. No. 23 Squadron reformed at RAAF Base Richmond in February 1939 and in late August of that same year it redeployed to RAAF Station Archerfield, operating Avro Ansons and De Havilland Tiger Moths on maritime reconnaissance and anti-submarine patrols off the east coast of Queensland following the commencement of hostilities with Germany. The squadron was later re-equipped with CAC Wirraways and Lockheed Hudsons. Between August 1940 and June 1943 the squadron continued to conduct seaward patrols and escorted shipping in the Brisbane region. In May 1943, the squadron was equipped with six P-39 Airacobra fighters in addition to 18 Wirraways.

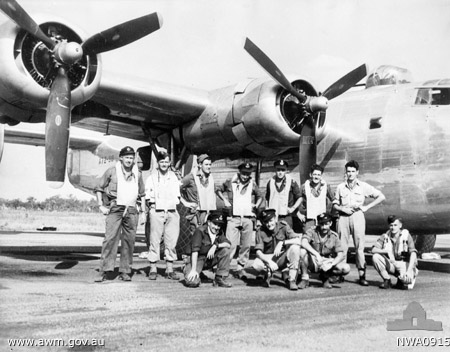
The crew of a No. 23 Squadron B-24 with their aircraft in June 1945

In June 1943, No. 23 Squadron's role was changed to that of a dive bomber unit and the squadron was re-equipped with Vultee Vengeance aircraft. After a period of training the squadron deployed to Nadzab in New Guinea in February 1944 and flew its first bombing missions against the Japanese on 11 February. It provided aerial support at Saidor to American ground forces. The squadron was withdrawn to Australia and reduced to cadre status in March 1944, as the Vengeance was regarded as inferior to other aircraft which had become available to Allied forces, and was eventually withdrawn from operational service.

No. 23 Squadron returned to operational status as a heavy bomber squadron in October 1944 after being re-equipped with B-24 Liberator bombers. As part of No. 82 Wing RAAF, the squadron deployed to Long Airfield in the Northern Territory in April 1945 and conducted bombing and anti-shipping missions over the Netherlands East Indies until the end of the war. Following the Japanese surrender the squadron's B-24s were based at Balikpapan in Borneo and operated in the transport role, flying ex-Prisoners of War and other Australian personnel back to Australia. No. 23 Squadron returned to Australia in November 1945 and was based at RAAF Station Tocumwal until early 1948 when it moved to RAAF Base Amberley and was redesignated No. 6 Squadron. A total of 36 personnel from No. 23 Squadron were killed during the war.

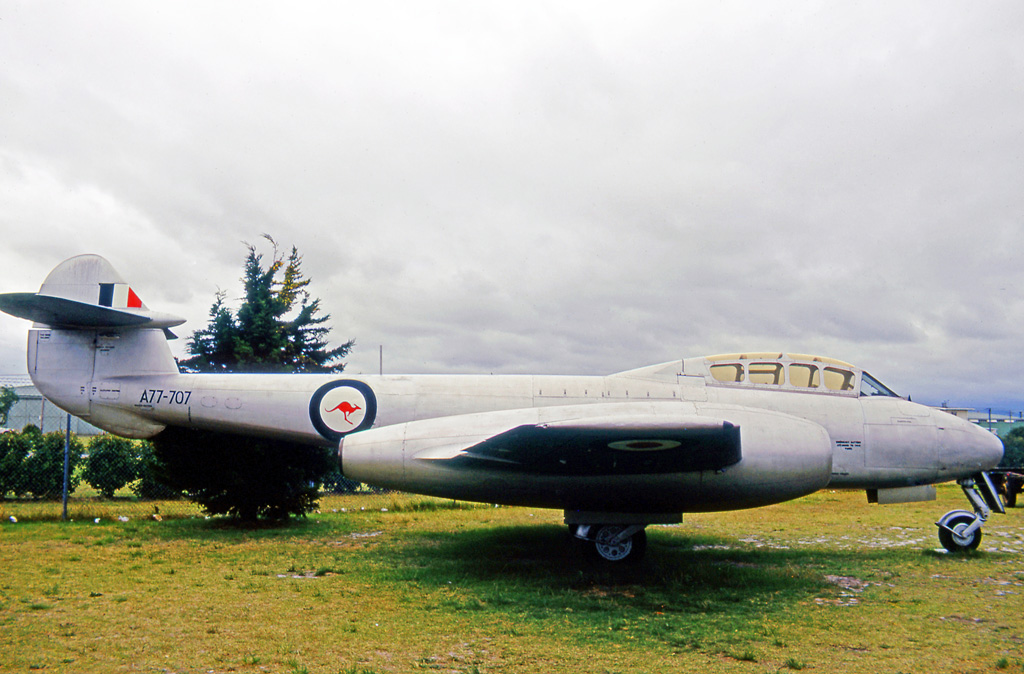
Gloster Meteor T.7 trainer of No. 23 Squadron preserved after retirement from service in 1960.

No. 23 Squadron was re-formed at Archerfield on 1 April 1948 as a Citizen Air Force squadron equipped with fighter and training aircraft. The squadron initially flew P-51 Mustang piston-engine fighters and Tiger Moth trainers, but it was later re-equipped with de Havilland Vampire and Gloster Meteor F.8 jet fighters in the 1950s. The squadron ceased flying activities in June 1960 and assumed a ground training role for members of the RAAF reserve in southern Queensland. On 1 July 2010, changes to the structure of the Combat Support Group resulted in the combat support functions of No. 382 Expeditionary Combat Support Squadron (382ECSS) being integrated with No. 23 Squadron at RAAF Amberley and 382ECSS being disbanded.

== Aircraft operated ==
No. 23 Squadron operated the following aircraft:

- Hawker Demon
- Avro Cadet
- Avro Anson
- CAC Wirraway
- Lockheed Hudson
- P-39 Airacobra
- Vultee Vengeance
- Consolidated B-24 Liberator
- P-51 D Mustang
- de Havilland Tiger Moth
- de Havilland Vampire
- Gloster Meteor

== See also ==
- Vultee Vengeance in Australian service
