= No. 5 Service Flying Training School RAAF =

Royal Australian Air Force flight training unit during World War II

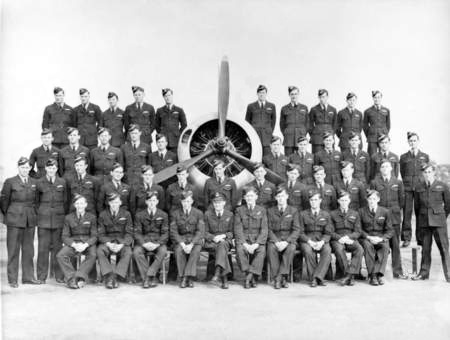
- Post-graduation group portrait of No. 33 Course at No. 5 SFTS in front of a Wirraway trainer, July 1943
- Active: 1941–46
- Allegiance: Australia
- Branch: Royal Australian Air Force
- Role: Intermediate/advanced flight training
- Part of: No. 2 Training Group
- Garrison/HQ: RAAF Station Uranquinty

Commanders
- Notable commanders: Leon Lachal (May–August 1942); Allan Walters (June–July 1943)

No. 5 Service Flying Training School (No. 5 SFTS) was a Royal Australian Air Force (RAAF) flight training unit that operated during World War II. It was one of eight Service Flying Training Schools established by the RAAF to provide intermediate and advanced flying instruction to new pilots as part of Australia's contribution to the Empire Air Training Scheme. No. 5 SFTS was formed at RAAF Station Uranquinty, New South Wales, in October 1941, and disbanded in February 1946. Its staff and equipment were employed to re-establish No. 1 Flying Training School, which transferred to RAAF Station Point Cook, Victoria, the following year. Care and Maintenance Unit Uranquinty was also formed from No. 5 SFTS's facilities, to look after surplus aircraft at the base prior to their disposal, and disbanded in December 1948.

== History ==
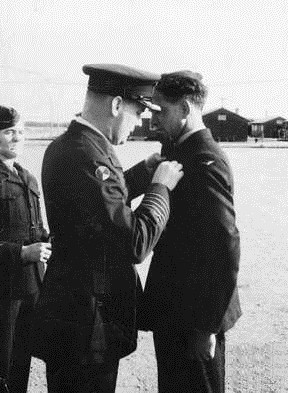
Leading Aircraftman Len Waters receives his "wings" after graduating from No. 5 SFTS on 1 July 1944

RAAF aircrew training expanded dramatically following the outbreak of World War II, in response to Australia's participation in the Empire Air Training Scheme (EATS). The Air Force's pre-war flight training facility, No. 1 Flying Training School at RAAF Station Point Cook, Victoria, was supplanted in 1940–41 by twelve Elementary Flying Training Schools (EFTS), eight Service Flying Training Schools (SFTS), and the Central Flying School (CFS). While CFS turned out new flight instructors, the EFTS provided basic training to prospective pilots who, if successful, would go on to an SFTS for further instruction that focussed on operational (or "service") flying techniques.

The course at SFTS typically consisted of two streams, intermediate and advanced, and included such techniques as instrument flying, night flying, advanced aerobatics, formation flying, dive bombing, and aerial gunnery. The total duration of training varied during the war as demand for aircrew fluctuated. Initially running for 16 weeks, the course was cut to 10 weeks (which included 75 hours flying time) in October 1940. A year later it was raised to 12 weeks (including 100 hours flying time), and again to 16 weeks two months later. It continued to increase after this, peaking at 28 weeks in June 1944.

No. 5 Service Flying Training School (No. 5 SFTS) was formed at RAAF Station Uranquinty, New South Wales, in October 1941, and came under the control of No. 2 Training Group. Along with No. 2 Service Flying Training School at nearby RAAF Station Forest Hill, and the later No. 1 Basic Flying Training School at Uranquinty, No. 5 SFTS was one of the so-called "Wagga Flying Training Schools", which together graduated over 3,000 pilots in the 1940s and '50s. The unit's inaugural commanding officer was Group Captain Ulex Ewart, a graduate of the Royal Military College, Duntroon, who had been seconded to the Air Force and learnt to fly on the first cadet course at No. 1 Flying Training School in 1923. At the time of its formation, No. 5 SFTS had a strength of 792 personnel, responsible for training about 200 pilots. One of its original instructors was Flying Officer Bill Newton, who was later awarded the Victoria Cross for bombing raids in New Guinea. Following the outbreak of the Pacific War in December 1941, the school's CAC Wirraway single-engined trainers were classified as Second Line (Reserve) aircraft in the defence of Australia.

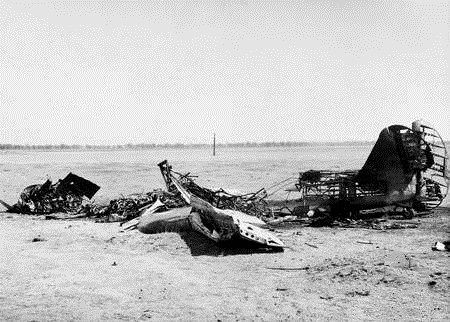
Wreckage of a Wirraway from No. 5 SFTS that crashed on 26 March 1945, killing both occupants

No. 5 SFTS began flight training in February 1942 using 28 Wirraways. The unit grew over the next two years, and by early 1944 was operating 128 Wirraways, two de Havilland DH.84 Dragons, two de Havilland Moth Minors and a CAC Wackett. It typically graduated one course of pilots each month, although the wastage rate sometimes exceeded 40 per cent. Among its graduates was Len Waters, the first Aboriginal Australian military aviator, and the only one to serve as a fighter pilot in the RAAF during World War II. As a training facility, No. 5 SFTS regularly suffered flying accidents. Forty-two of its students died during the war, an average of around one per month. A near miss involving more experienced pilots occurred at the school in December 1943, when aces Clive Caldwell and John Waddy, then instructors at No. 2 Operational Training Unit in Mildura, almost collided when they crossed paths during an aerobatics display over the base.

No. 5 SFTS reached a strength of some 2,000 personnel during the war, and graduated 1,515 pilots. The rate of flying conducted at the school declined during 1945 and, by November, its aircraft were being readied for storage. In February 1946, No. 5 SFTS was disbanded and its staff and equipment used to re-establish No. 1 Flying Training School (No. 1 FTS), which had operated during the war as No. 1 Service Flying Training School prior to disbanding in 1944. No. 1 FTS was allocated 55 Wirraways, two de Havilland Tiger Moths, and one Avro Anson, though in the event it undertook little flying before relocating to Point Cook in August 1947. Post-war demobilisation saw the establishment of several RAAF Care and Maintenance Units (CMU), which were responsible for the upkeep of surplus equipment prior to disposal. No. 5 SFTS spawned Care and Maintenance Unit Uranquinty to look after aircraft stored at the base. These were auctioned off in November 1948, and CMU Uranquinty was dissolved the next month.

== Legacy ==
Following the departure of No. 1 FTS in 1947, no flying was conducted at Uranquinty until 1951, when the newly formed No. 1 Basic Flying Training School (No. 1 BFTS) inherited the base facilities. No. 1 BFTS transferred to Point Cook in 1958, at which point Uranquinty was closed. The RAAF units that operated at the base formed a close connection with the local community. In 1999, a memorial to No. 5 SFTS was erected at Wirraway Park, Uranquinty. An additional panel to the memorial was unveiled in September 2002 by the Governor-General of Australia, Peter Hollingworth; the proceedings included an aerial display by a Pilatus PC-9 of the Roulettes aerobatic team, and the arrival of a Wirraway from Temora Aviation Museum, the first time in 45 years that one of these trainers had landed at Uranquinty.
