= RAAF Station Archerfield =

Former Royal Australian Air Force station in Brisbane, Queensland, Australia

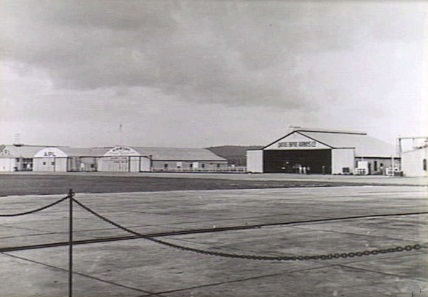
- Hangars at RAAF Station Archerfield in 1940

Site history
- Built: 1939
- In use: 1939 to 1956

RAAF Station Archerfield was a permanent Royal Australian Air Force station at Archerfield Airport in Brisbane, Queensland, Australia, from 1939 to 1956.

== History ==
=== 1939–1945 ===
At the outbreak of World War II in September 1939, the Royal Australian Air Force (RAAF) took over the Royal Queensland Aero Club facilities at Archerfield Airport. Club aircraft were impressed into service and flying instructors were commissioned into the RAAF. No. 2 Elementary Flying Training School RAAF was transferred to Archerfield to look after flight training. No. 23 Squadron RAAF, now officially called "City of Brisbane Squadron", received the Australian built CAC Wirraway to defend the city against air attack.

Up to 1941, Archerfield was being upgraded as a military base for the RAAF pending completion of RAAF Base Amberley. In 1940 a new administration block with control tower on top was built and the RAAF built hangars and huts along the southern boundary of the field.

The attack on the US base in Pearl Harbor coincided with another on US bases in the Philippines. The loss of these bases made Australia, especially the north of the country, a valuable staging area for the war against the Japanese. In the following months, military aircraft of several countries competed for space with the civil airliners still operating.

On 1 July 1942, the RAAF transferred control of the airfield to the United States Army Air Forces. Visitors to the station included General Douglas MacArthur and a young Gough Whitlam, then a navigator on a Lockheed Ventura.

In March 1945, the Royal Navy established its Transportable Aircraft Maintenance Yard 1 (TAMY 1) at Archerfield. The Royal Navy's facilities were officially commissioned on 27 March as HMS Nabsford, the Royal Naval Aircraft Maintenance Yard at Archerfield. a plaque commemorating it and the British personnel who served in the Pacific theatre can be viewed in the old administration building along with plaques from the RAAF and the US 5th Air Force.

On 31 March 1946, HMS Nabsford and the Royal Navy Air Maintenance Yard at Archerfield were decommissioned.

=== 1945–1956 ===
No. 23 Squadron RAAF was reformed at Archerfield in 1947 flying the CA-17 Mustang 20. No. 1 Initial Flying Training School was based at Archerfield in 1951 until it was merged with No. 1 Basic Flying School in 1955. No. 23 Squadron RAAF re-equipped with the De Havilland Vampire in 1955, but the grass fires started by the Vampires' jet exhausts on the grass runways necessitated relocating the squadron to RAAF Base Amberley. The Station Headquarters was closed soon after.

== Units based at Archerfield ==
=== Royal Australian Air Force ===
- No. 23 Squadron RAAF: 1939–1942 (CAC Wirraway, Avro Anson, Lockheed Hudson), 1947–1955 (CA-17 Mustang 20, Vampire)
- No. 1 Initial Flying Training School, 1951–1955 (Tiger Moth)
- No. 2 Elementary Flying Training School RAAF, 1939–1942 (Tiger Moth, Gypsy Moth)
- No. 2 Air Ambulance Unit RAAF: 1944–1946 (Fox Moth, Moth Minor, Lockheed Hudson, DH.84, C-47 Dakota)
- No. 4 Communications Flight: 1942–1946 (Avro Anson, Lockheed Hudson, CAC Wirraway, Tiger Moth, Moth Minor, Lockheed Lodestar, Bristol Beaufort, Bristol Beaufighter)
- No. 38 (T) Squadron RAAF: 1944–1946 (C-47 Dakota)
- No. 323 Radar Squadron RAAF: 1945
- No. 324 Radar Squadron RAAF: 1945
- No. 325 Radar Squadron RAAF: 1945
- No. 342 Radar Squadron RAAF: 1945
- No. 76 Squadron RAAF: 1942 (P-40E Kittyhawk)

=== United States Army Air Force ===
- 19th Special Operations Squadron
- 21st Troop Carrier Squadron
- 33d Flying Training Squadron
- 39th Troop Carrier Squadron
- 90th Fighter Squadron
- 1535th Ordnance S&M Company

=== Royal Netherlands Air Force ===
- NEI-Transport Section, Brisbane: 1944–1945 (Lockheed Lodestar, B-25 Mitchell)

=== Royal Navy Fleet Air Arm ===
- Transportable Aircraft Maintenance Yard No.1
