= RAAF Base Uranquinty =

Coordinates: 35°11′51″S 147°12′29″E

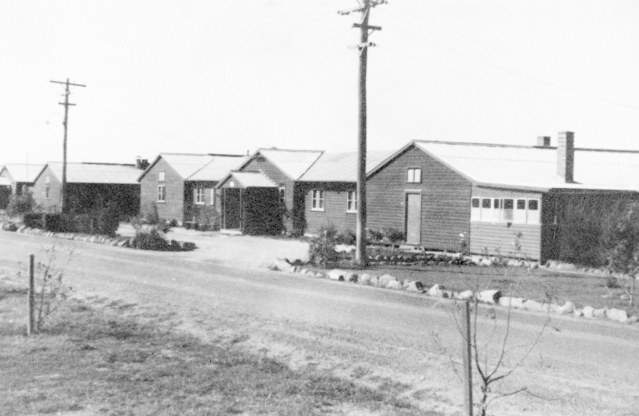
The "main street" of No. 5 Service Flying Training School at Uranquinty in 1943

RAAF Base Uranquinty was a Royal Australian Air Force (RAAF) base located at Uranquinty, New South Wales. Land was requisitioned in 1940 as part of the Empire Air Training Scheme during the Second World War, for the formation of No. 5 Service Flying Training School.

The base was closed in 1947, and the control tower dismantled by No. 2 Airfield Construction Squadron and shipped to RAAF Woomera—the airbase supporting the operation of the RAAF Woomera Test Range—where it remains in operation.

Refresher courses were undertaken at Uranquinty for qualified pilots until being relocated to RAAF Point Cook, Victoria, in 1948. The land was used as a migrant centre until September 1951, when the RAAF required the base to be reopened; No. 1 Basic Flying Training School operated there until 19 December 1958, when the base was closed down.

A memorial to airmen who trained at the base was dedicated in Uranquinty during 1999.

== See also ==
- List of airports in New South Wales
