= RAAF Base Pearce =

Air force base in Western Australia

- Bullsbrook, north of Perth, Western Australia in Australia
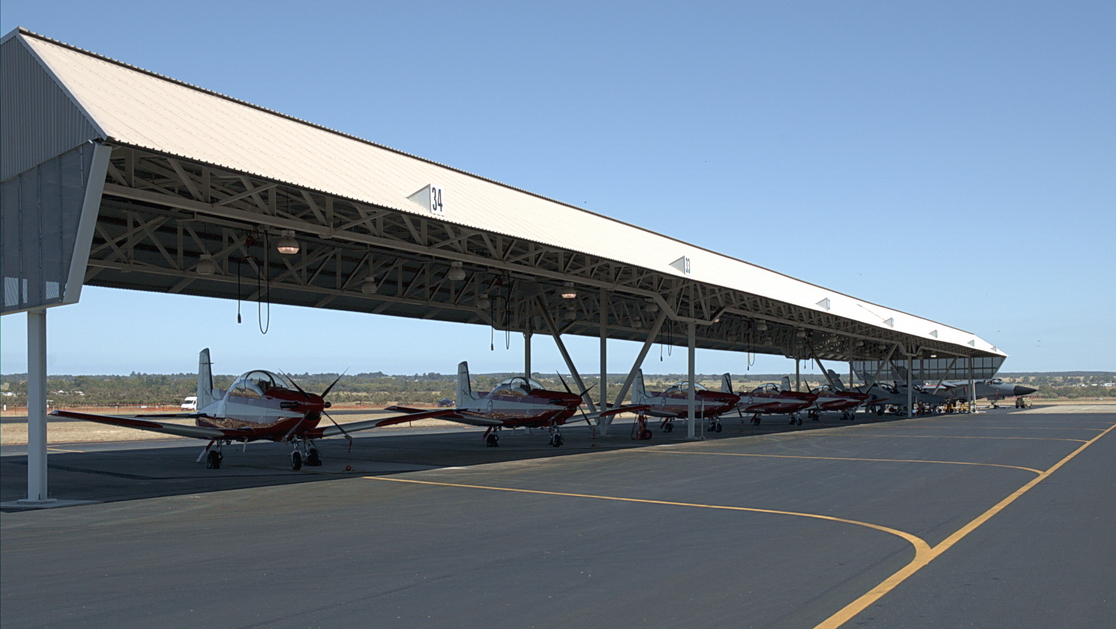
- Lineup of PC-9 aircraft from No 2 FTS at RAAF Base Pearce

Site information
- Type: Military air base
- Owner: Department of Defence
- Operator: Royal Australian Air Force
- Website: RAAF Base Pearce

Location
- Location in Western Australia
- Coordinates: 31°40′04″S 116°00′54″E

Site history
- Built: 1936 – 1939
- In use: 6 February 1939 – present

Garrison information
- Occupants: No. 2 Flying Training School; No. 25 (City of Perth) Squadron; No. 79 Squadron; No. 453 Squadron Pearce Flight; No. 3 Security Force Squadron Detachment; No. 1 Expeditionary Health Squadron Detachment Pearce; Republic of Singapore Air Force 130 SQN

Airfield information
- Identifiers: ICAO: YPEA
- Elevation: 46 metres (150 ft) AMSL
Runways
Direction	Length and surface
05/23	1,691 metres (5,548 ft) Asphalt
18L/36R	2,974 metres (9,757 ft) Asphalt
18R/36L	1,741 metres (5,712 ft) Concrete
- Sources: Australian AIP, aerodrome chart, and AIS AF

RAAF Base Pearce (ICAO: YPEA) is the main Royal Australian Air Force (RAAF) military air base in Western Australia, located in Bullsbrook, north of Perth. It is used for training by the RAAF and the Republic of Singapore Air Force.

Pearce is the busiest RAAF base in Australia, with the highest air traffic including civil flights, including civil movements at the Joint User bases. Although its primary role is pilot training, it remains the only permanent RAAF base on the west coast, and thus has a significant logistics role. Pearce also has operational responsibility for RAAF Gingin, a small military airfield used for flying training, located 34 km (21 mi) north of Pearce. When requested by the flying units, a rotation of air traffic controllers travel from Pearce to Gingin daily to provide services.

== History ==
Built between 1936 and 1939, RAAF Base Pearce was officially granted "station" status on 6 February 1939. It was named in honour of Sir George Pearce, a Senator from Western Australia. Pearce was elected to the inaugural Senate in 1901 and remained a Senator for Western Australia until 1938. He was Minister for Defence in four separate ministries including the period 1910 to 1913 when the Central Flying School was established.

The base opened with two resident squadrons, Nos. 14 and 25 Squadrons. During World War II, No. 5 Initial Training School (ITS) was formed at RAAF Pearce as part of the Empire Air Training Scheme and No. 85 Squadron RAAF was stationed. Recruits commenced their military service at the ITS, learning fundamentals such as mathematics, navigation and aerodynamics.

On 10 September 1950 a one-off motor race meeting, called the "Air Force Handicap" was held as a part of an air show. The circuit was triangular in shape, and used all three runways of the base. The feature race was won on handicap by Syd Negus in a Plymouth Special, ahead of Syd Barker in a Ballot V8 and Arthur Collett in an MG TC.

In 1964, Australia and the United States agreed to conduct a "Joint Research Program for Studying Aero-Space Disturbances and their Effect on Radio Communications" at the Pearce base.

RAAF Base Pearce is used by the Australian Air Force Cadets as a headquarters and for promotional courses, as well as serving as headquarters for No. 7 Wing and premises for No. 701 Squadron (AAFC).

The base also serves as an anti-hijacking training aid for Special Air Service Regiment counter-terrorism squadron, also known as Tactical Assault Group (West). It is used to practise airliner entry and hostage rescue drills. The base is home to a mockup of a Boeing 747 used for this counter-terrorism training. Built in the early 1990s the mockup is slightly smaller than the Boeing 747, includes two non-operational engines and has been painted in the livery of the fictional Emu Airlines.

Since 1993, Republic of Singapore Air Force (RSAF) has operated its Flying Training Institute at Pearce. As part of the institute, No. 130 Squadron RSAF operates training aircraft at Pearce.

The 2005 Defence Force Air Show, held at Pearce on 19–20 November, marked the first visit to Perth of the United States Air Force (USAF) B-1B Lancer bomber. The 2012 Defence Force Air Show, held at Pearce on 19–20 May, included visits by a USAF B-52 bomber, a USAF KC-135 tanker, an RAAF AEW&C Wedgetail and an RSAF C-130 Hercules.

In 2014, the base was the hub for the international search of the southern Indian Ocean for Malaysia Airlines Flight 370. It hosted search aircraft from six other nations including a United States Navy P-8 Poseidon, P-3 Orions of the Royal New Zealand Air Force, Japanese Maritime Self-Defense Force and Republic of Korea Navy, and Ilyushin Il-76s of the Chinese People's Liberation Army Air Force.

Pearce has sometimes been proposed as the site for a second Perth international airport.

== RAAF units ==
The following units are located at RAAF Base Pearce:

Unit	Full name	Force Element Group	Aircraft	Notes
2FTS	No. 2 Flying Training School	Air Force Training Group	Operates PC-21 trainers	
25SQN	No. 25 (City of Perth) Squadron	Air Force Training Group	Air Force Reserve	
79SQN	No. 79 Squadron	Air Combat Group	Operates Hawk 127 fighter-trainers	
453SQN	No. 453 Squadron Pearce Flight	Surveillance and Response Group	Air traffic control	
1AOSS	No. 1 Airfield Operations Support Squadron Detachment Pearce	Combat Support Group	Airfield engineering	
1EHS	No. 1 Expeditionary Health Squadron Detachment Pearce	Combat Support Group		
3SFS	No. 3 Security Force Squadron Detachment	Combat Support Group		
	Combat Support Unit Pearce	Combat Support Group	Base managers	

== Gallery ==
Sign for the Republic of Singapore Air Force's Flying Training School (130 SQN) at RAAF Base Pearce.

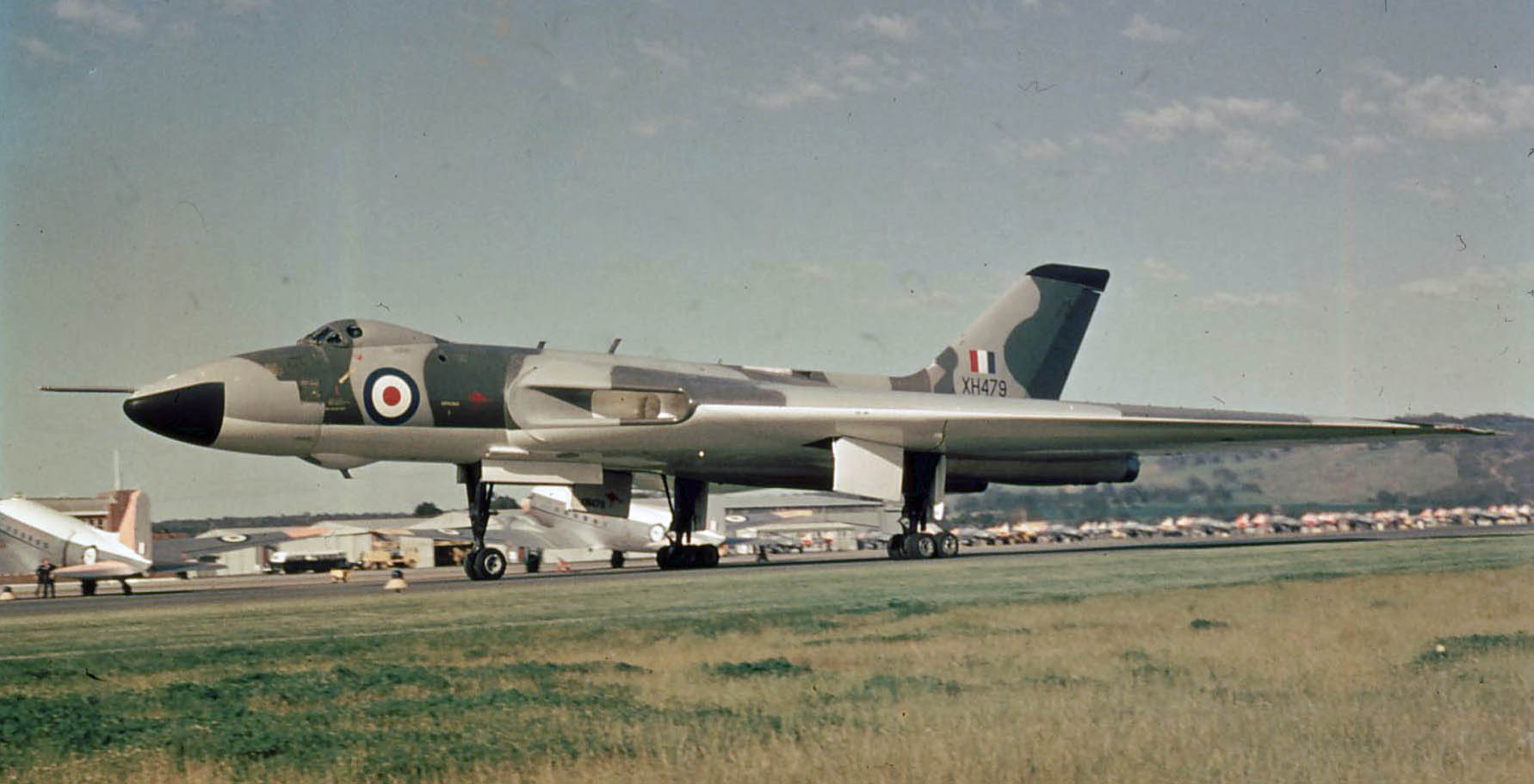
A Royal Air Force Avro 698 Vulcan B1A at RAAF Base Pearce in the 1970s.

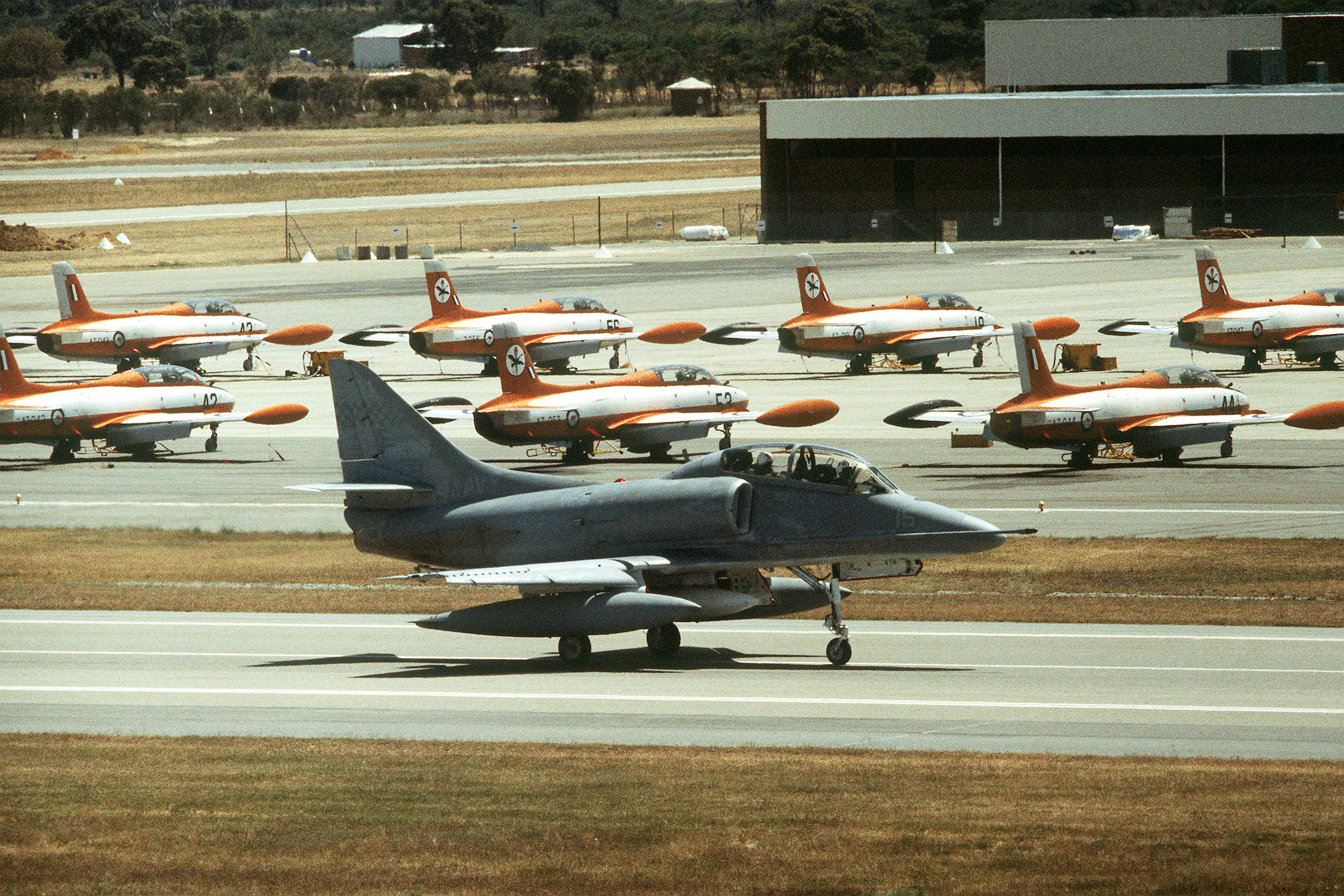
A US Navy Douglas TA-4J Skyhawk at RAAF Base Pearce in 1982.

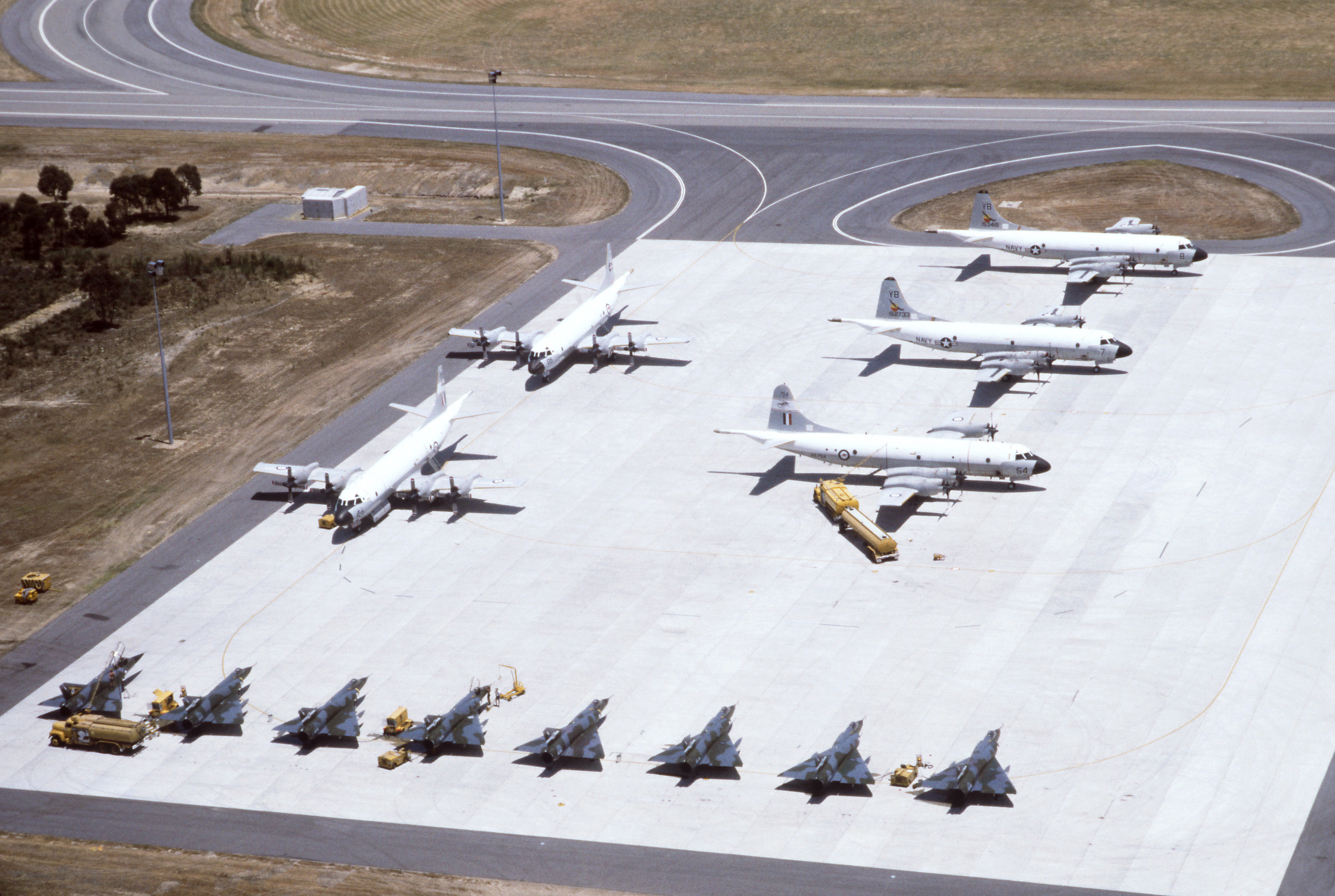
An aerial view of Royal Australian Air Force (RAAF) fighters, Royal New Zealand Air Force (RNZAF) and United States Navy (USN) patrol aircraft (bottom to top) parked on a ramp during exercise Sandgroper 1982. Visible are seven Dassault Mirage IIIO and one Mirage IIID of No. 77 Squadron RAAF, two Lockheed P-3C Orion aircraft of No. 10 Squadron RAAF, one Lockheed P-3B Orion of No. 5 Squadron RNZAF, and two P-3B (BuNos 152733 and 153418) of Patrol Squadron VP-1 Screaming Eagles, USN.

== See also ==
- List of airports in Western Australia
- List of Royal Australian Air Force installations
