= CAC Wirraway =

1937 Australian trainer aircraft

Wirraway
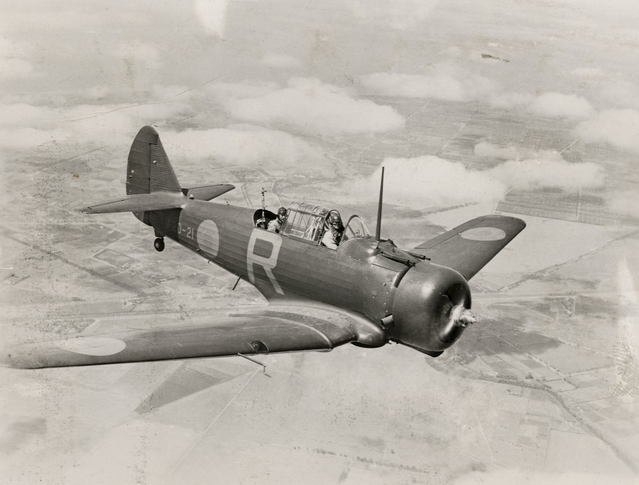

General information
- Type: Trainer/general purpose
- Manufacturer: Commonwealth Aircraft Corporation
- Primary users: Royal Australian Air Force Royal Australian Navy
- Number built: 755

History
- Manufactured: 1939–1946
- Introduction date: 1939
- First flight: 1937 (see Development)
- Retired: 1959
- Developed from: North American NA-16
- Developed into: CAC Boomerang; CAC Ceres

The CAC Wirraway is a training and general purpose military aircraft manufactured in Australia by the Commonwealth Aircraft Corporation (CAC) between 1939 and 1946. It was an Australian development of the North American NA-16 training aircraft. The Wirraway has been credited as being the foundation of Australian aircraft manufacturing.

When the name was announced on 6 April 1938, it was said to be "an Aboriginal word meaning challenge". The word presumably comes from Daniel Bunce's compilation Language of the Aborigines of the colony of Victoria, where Wirraway is glossed 'challenge; dare, to defy; incite, to stir up; menace, to threaten'.

During the Second World War, the Royal Australian Air Force (RAAF) deployed a number of Wirraways into combat roles, where they served in a light bomber/ground attack capacity, striking against the advancing forces of the Empire of Japan. While the type had been primarily used as a general purpose aircraft, being present in small quantities within the majority of front-line squadrons for these purposes, the aircraft was often pressed into combat when required. Typically, fighter versions of the Wirraway were operated over theatres such as New Guinea to perform ground attack missions and other Army co-operation tasks over extended periods until more advanced aircraft had become available in sufficient quantities. On 12 December 1942, the Wirraway achieved its only shoot-down of an enemy aircraft—thought to be a Mitsubishi A6M Zero at the time, but later determined to be a Nakajima Ki-43 Hayabusa—while flown by Pilot Officer John S. "Jack" Archer.

Following the end of the conflict, the Wirraway was operated for over a decade as a trainer by the RAAF, the newly formed RAN Fleet Air Arm, and the squadrons of the Citizen Air Force. During 1957, the last of the RAN's Wirraways was retired, having been replaced by the newer jet-powered de Havilland Vampire; as the CAC Winjeel came into squadron service, the RAAF phasing out its remaining fleet of Wirraways during the late 1950s. Officially, the last military flight to be performed by the type was conducted on 27 April 1959. Notably, the Wirraway had also functioned as the starting point for the design of a wartime "emergency fighter", which was also developed and manufactured by CAC, known as the Boomerang.

== Development ==
=== Background ===
During the mid-1930s, some political leaders observed that both the Empire of Japan and Nazi Germany had the appearance of having been making strides towards a heavy preparedness for war, which in turn led to several other countries commencing their own preparations in response. However, in the case of Australia, the nation had no domestic aircraft industry, partially due to a historical preference for the procurement of both civil and military-orientated aircraft to be sourced overseas from manufacturers based in the United Kingdom, which had come about through strong political and cultural ties between the two nations. Around the same time, the Australian government decided to embark upon the development and expansion of the RAAF into a fighting force capable of defending the nation against external aggressors, in line with recommendations made by a formal evaluation compiled by Sir John Salmond in 1928. Allegedly, the move in Australia had been heavily influenced by a British decision taken in May 1935 to massively increase the front-line strength of the Royal Air Force (RAF).

However, it was recognised that, while Britain had traditionally been the main source of aircraft for Australia, comprising around 50 per cent of all operational aircraft at one point, British industry was already coming under strain to meet the demands for the RAF (a planned front line strength of 1,500 aircraft by 1930), let alone satisfying major orders from other nations. Coincidentally, figures such as the industrialist Essington Lewis had taken an interest in the development of a domestic aircraft industry within Australia. These factors cumulated in a special conference held by the Australian government at which the first plans for syndicate-operated factories to produce both aircraft and aero engines were formulated. Accordingly, during early 1936, three Royal Australian Air Force (RAAF) officers, led by Wing Commander Lawrence Wackett, were sent on an overseas evaluation mission to inspect aircraft production in Europe, Britain, and the United States, as well as to support the selection of an aircraft design for local production in Australia.

In light of the industrial circumstances, the production of cutting-edge high performance fighter aircraft, such as the Supermarine Spitfire, were viewed as being too ambitious and a potential jeopardy to the whole venture. The government's position focused on the establishment of an industrial base capable of producing aircraft; thus, it was determined that the first aircraft to be domestically manufactured should be a reliable and established general purpose aircraft, while a long-term goal of proceeding to locally produce high-performance fighters would take around five years to attain. The question of what specific aircraft should be manufactured was a more complex question, as it was quickly recognised that there was no existing aircraft in RAAF service that was attractive to pursue local production of.

On 17 October 1936, with the encouragement of the Government of Australia, three companies came together to form a joint venture, registered as the Commonwealth Aircraft Corporation (CAC), which had the initial goal of assessing the viability for developing a self-sufficient aircraft industry in the nation. Early on, CAC set about planning for the establishment of both engine and aircraft manufacturing and testing facilities at Fishermans Bend, Melbourne, Victoria, purchasing tooling and equipment from manufacturers in both Britain and the United States. The newly formed company quickly decided that it would initially pursue the development and production of a single-engine armed advanced trainer aircraft, which would likely be a licence-built version of an existing aircraft. An investigation of various European and American-sourced aircraft was conducted to judge candidate designs for suitability.

=== Selection ===
The aircraft selected by CAC was the North American Aviation (NAA) NA-16, upon the recommendation of Lawrence Wackett. The selection was heavily fuelled by the relatively low level of difficulty involved in the manufacture of both the airframe and its Pratt & Whitney R-1340 Wasp radial engine. The application for the NA-16 was often viewed as being suitable for the trainer aircraft role, but that it could also play some role as a fighter-bomber as well, although there were doubts voiced by senior figures over its combat suitability. The selection was not without controversy as some voices within the Australian government were keen for aircraft manufacturing and development to be kept within the Commonwealth of Nations. In 1938, an inspection by Sir Edward Ellington of the then in-development Wirraway in 1938 led to him to express his opinion that the type should only serve temporarily in combat roles, and that the choice should be delayed to await the testing of a suitable British aircraft for the mission.

Nevertheless, the proposal of producing a modified variant of the NA-16, known as the Wirraway, received official approval. During 1937, CAC was informed to prepare for the production of an initial batch of 40 aircraft, if the type proved satisfactory. In late June 1938, the Australian government announced that it had placed an order for 40 Wirraways; it stated at the time that the price involved was competitive with comparative imported aircraft. Ellington's report on the aircraft's suitability was hotly contested, especially by the Australian Air Board, which had been subject to considerable criticism by Ellington; the board defended the Wirraway as being the best available aircraft in its class.

During 1937, production licences for the type were obtained from North American Aviation along with an accompanying arrangement to domestically produce the Wirraway's Wasp engine from Pratt & Whitney. Additionally, a pair of NA-16s were purchased directly from North American to act as prototypes. The first of these two aircraft was the fixed undercarriage NA-16-1A (similar in design to the BT-9); the second was the retractable undercarriage NA-16-2K (similar to the BC-1). These two aircraft were also known by their NAA project accounting codes (NA-32 for the NA-16-1A and NA-33 for the NA-16-2K) sometimes leading to confusion; these accounting codes (or "charge" codes) were used internally by NAA to track their projects and were not the actual aircraft model numbers. During August 1937, the NA-16-1A arrived in Australia and, following its re-assembly, flew for the first time at Laverton on 3 September of that year, exactly two years before war was declared on Nazi Germany by the United Kingdom and France. During September 1937, the NA-16-2K arrived in Australia and likewise flew shortly afterwards. These aircraft were given the RAAF serials A20-1 and A20-2 within that organisation's numbering system.

=== Production ===
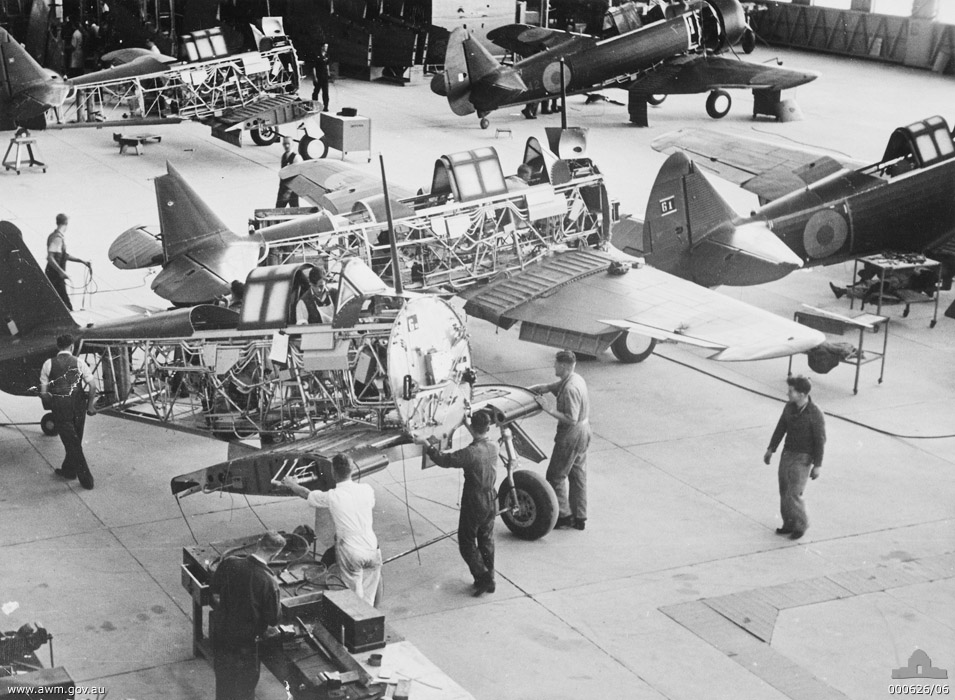
Wirraway aircraft under construction at a CAC factory in 1940

The NA-16-2K model was the type selected for initial production. The design featured several detail and structural changes, such as provisions for the fitting of a pair of forward-firing guns instead of the NA-16's single gun, and the strengthening of the tail and wings to better facilitate dive-bombing operations. Other modifications included the adoption of a single gun set on a swivelling mount to the rear of the cockpit, along with the installation of cameras and radio sets. On 27 March 1939, the first CA-1 Wirraway, RAAF serial A20-3, performed its maiden flight. This aircraft was subsequently retained by CAC for evaluation and trials for a number of months; on 10 July 1939, the first pair of Wirraways to be delivered to the RAAF, serials A20-4 and A20-5, were received by the service.

By the outbreak of the Second World War, the RAAF had received a total of six Wirraways. Early on, it became clear that CAC's rate of manufacture of the airframes outstripped Australian capacity to produce the Wasp engines to power the type. During 1940, having observed an excess of Australian capacity, Britain issued an offer to procure any Wirraway airframes that could be produced that had not already been allocated to fulfil RAAF orders, intending to fit US-built Wasp engines to power them. This led to the placing of an initial British order for 245 aircraft, the last of which was to be delivered before the end of 1942. During October 1940, this order was expanded to cover 500 aircraft, 300 of which being scheduled for delivery during 1943. While these orders were ultimately unmet due to the implementation of the extensive American-led Lend-Lease arrangement, the British government did finance the procurement of aircraft for Australian use within the Empire Air Training Scheme.

Forty CA-1 Wirraways were constructed before the improved CA-3 variant entered production. Although there were detail changes to the design, the change in designation had more to do with the next batch of Wirraways being built to a different government contract than any real difference between the two sub-types. During February 1942, the Australian War Cabinet issued its approval for the production of 105 Wirraway interceptors as "reinsurance against [an] inability to obtain fighter aircraft from overseas". Around this time, the War Cabinet also decided to reject an order for 245 Wirraways that had been received from Britain. In July 1940, at which point the United Kingdom was the sole European nation fighting against German in the war, the Australian Government issued a statement advising that "from this date onward Australia can rely on England for no further supplies of any aircraft materials or equipment of any kind.

The CA-5, CA-7, CA-8 and CA-9 models were all broadly similar to the CA-3; only the CA-16 variant featured substantial design changes; amongst other purposes, several wing modifications had been made to allow for the carriage of a heavier bomb load, along with the addition of dive brakes for dive-bombing. Sets of 'dive bomber' wings (as fitted to the CA-16) were built under the designation of CA-10A (the CA-10 model was a proposed dive-bomber variant that remained unbuilt), and retrofitted to CA-3s, −5s, −7s and −9s; 113 Wirraways were converted. Production of the type continued even after the end of the Second World War. In July 1946, CA-16 A20-757, the last aircraft to be built of a total of 755 Wirraways, was delivered to the RAAF.

== Design ==
The CAC Wirraway was a training and general purpose military aircraft. The fuselage comprised a welded framework composed of chromium steel, which was constructed from four separately produced sections bolted together during final assembly. The sides of the fuselage featured fabric covering supported by aluminium alloy frames, while the underside and decking has metal coverings instead. The single-spar wings, which were built in five individual sections, were composed of spaced ribs and a stressed skin. The control surfaces were metal-framed with fabric covering; the split-flap arrangement of early Wirraways were supplemented on later-built aircraft via the addition of dive brakes. An all-metal stressed skin construction was used for the tailplane and fin; both sides of the tailplane were interchangeable. The landing gear featured factory-fitted treadless smooth wheels.

The Wirraway had a wingspan of 13.068 m (42 ft 10.5 in). The first 2.90 m (9 ft 6 in) had a straight leading and trailing edge, the rest of the wing had a 12 degree sweep. It had a NACA 4412 airfoil at its theoretical tip. The wingtips had wire loops to help tie down the aircraft if necessary.

The Wirraway was powered by a single 450 kW (600 hp) Pratt & Whitney R-1340 Wasp radial engine, licence-built by CAC that allowing the aircraft to reach speeds of up to 191 kn (354 km/h). The engine drove a three-bladed constant speed variable-pitch propeller developed by de Havilland Propellers, with a diameter of 3.0 m (10 ft). The propeller had 6101A-3 blades with a 3D40 hub. Fuel was stored within a pair of 200 L; 54 US gal (45 imp gal) tanks. The two-man crew sat within a tandem cockpit, complete with a fully enclosed sliding canopy; both positions were fitted with flying controls. In addition, the rear cockpit featured a rotatable folding seat for the gunner/bomb-aimer, as well as a prone bombing position in the floor of the aircraft. The Wirraway could carry a light armament of a single 227 kg (500 lb) bomb or a pair of 113 kg (250 lb) bombs under the wings. The position of the bomb steadies under the wings were adjustable. Light bombs or flares could also be carried underneath the centreline section. Additionally, a pair of forward-firing Vickers Mk.V machine guns with 600 rounds were fitted along with a single swivel-mounted Vickers Mk 1 machine gun with 480 rounds across 8 magazine drums that was positioned at the rear of the cockpit. A later variant ^{(CA-16)} received strengthened wing struts, which allowed the installation of four 113 kg (250 lb) or two 227 kg (500 lb) and two 113 kg (250 lb) bombs.

The Wirraway could also carry two 91 kg (200 lb) storepedos fitted with parachutes which were used to deliver supplies and munitions to troops in the field.

== Operational history ==
=== Wartime service ===
In June 1939, in light of the declining situation in Europe and the increasing likelihood of a major conflict, the Chief of the Air staff recommended the expansion of the RAAF to a total of 32 squadrons; of these, preparations for nine general purpose squadrons, which were intended to be equipped with the Wirraway, were immediately put into motion. On 25 August 1939, one month after the first deliveries of the Wirraway had occurred, an official State of Emergency was declared; on 3 September 1939, as the Second World War broke out in Europe, Australia decided to mobilise the entirety of its air force, placing all squadrons on short call for combat operations. However, during the first year of the war, the Wirraway was still being introduced in quantity within many squadrons; this effort was delayed by a temporary shortage of available spare parts.

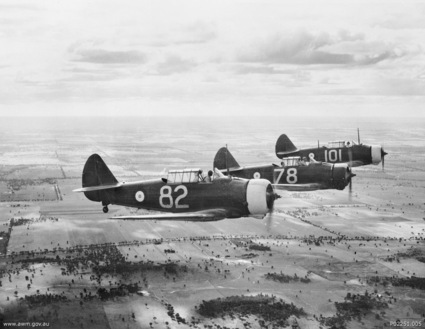
Wirraways assigned to No. 5 Service Flying Training School

As its American "cousin" the T-6 "Texan" (both types having been derived from the NA-16) did for many Allied Air Forces during the Second World War, the Wirraway served as one of the RAAF's main trainer types from 1939. Beside serving as a trainer aircraft they were also operated in combat roles, including as an emergency fighter. At the outbreak of the Pacific War in December 1941 Wirraways equipped seven RAAF squadrons: Nos 4, 5, 12, 22, 23, 24 and 25. A group of five Wirraways based at Kluang in Malaya for training purposes was pressed into combat against Japanese ground invasion forces; these were generally flown by New Zealanders with Australian observers, and had some successes.

As early as 1941, reports on the capabilities of Japanese fighter aircraft fuelled the perception that the Wirraway would be incapable of effectively engaging such aircraft; however, the type was judged to possess some merits in combat despite being considered to be obsolete. Regardless, the type was often put into action against the advancing Japanese forces. On 6 January 1942, Wirraways of No. 24 Squadron attempted to intercept Japanese seaplanes flying over New Britain; only one managed to engage an enemy aircraft, marking the first air-to-air combat between RAAF and Japanese forces. Two weeks later, eight 24 Squadron Wirraways defended the city of Rabaul from over 100 Japanese attacking bombers and fighters, resulting in the destruction or severe damage of all but two of the Australian aircraft.

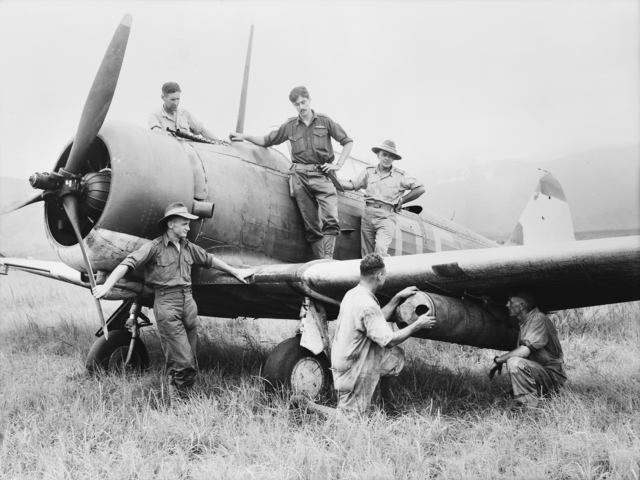
A Wirraway at a forward airstrip in New Guinea in 1944

On 12 December 1942, Pilot Officer J. S. Archer shot down a Japanese fighter aircraft (thought at the time to be a Mitsubishi A6M Zero, but found after the war to be a Ki-43 Hayabusa) after having spotted it around 1000 feet (about 300 metres) below him and dived on it, opening fire and sending the aircraft hurtling into the sea. This was the only occasion that a Wirraway shot down another aircraft (making it more successful than its fighter offspring, the Boomerang).

In response to a request by Sir Thomas Blamey for an army cooperation squadron operating a relatively slow aircraft, No. 4 Squadron, equipped with the Wirraway, was dispatched to Port Moresby during early November 1942. Operating over New Guinea, the type performed aerial reconnaissance, photography, artillery spotting, communication, supply drops, dive-bombing, ground attack and propaganda drops. In this capacity, the Wirraway proved to be fairly suitable; however, due to the risk of being misidentified as a hostile Zero, altitude restrictions were often imposed to deter incidents of friendly fire from Allied anti-aircraft gunners. Having become known for its versatility, fighter versions of the Wirraway operated over New Guinea for some time on ground attack and other Army co-operation tasks until other RAAF aircraft such as the Boomerang and American Curtiss P-40s were made available in sufficient quantity to replace them.

By mid-1943, nearly all frontline use of the Wirraway had come to an end, having been replaced by the newer Boomerang, itself a fighter-orientated derivative of the Wirraway. The majority of front-line squadrons of the RAAF had at least one Wirraway attached to serve as a squadron 'hack', that is, an aircraft employed on errands such as visits to headquarters or other bases. At least one aircraft (formerly A20-527) flew as part of Headquarters Flight 5th Air Force in full United States Army Air Forces markings.

=== Post-war and civil service ===
Post-war the Wirraway continued in RAAF service as a trainer at Uranquinty and Point Cook and was taken on strength by the newly formed RAN Fleet Air Arm in 1948. Wirraways also served with the squadrons of the Citizen Air Force (a flying reserve force of the RAAF established in 1948) alongside CAC Mustangs, partially equipping No. 22 (City of Sydney), No. 23 (City of Brisbane), No. 24 (City of Adelaide) and No. 25 (City of Perth) Squadrons. Duties were not limited to training flights: a Wirraway patrolling for sharks crashed on a beach at Maroochydore on 30 December 1950, killing three children and injuring 14 other people.

Twenty-four Wirraways were delivered to the Royal Australian Navy (RAN) from RAAF storage depots between November 1948 and November 1953. They included a CA-1, a CA-5 and numbers of all subsequent variants; they were operated under their original RAAF serials. One Wirraway (A120-145) was lost during naval service on 18 June 1953 following an engine failure after taking off at Nowra; the pilot survived. The RAN retired its Wirraways in 1957, replacing them with de Havilland Vampires. After CAC Winjeels started to enter service, the RAAF commenced phasing out its Wirraways on 4 December 1958 with a farewell flypast held at Point Cook to mark its retirement from that base. The last military flight was on 27 April 1959 when CA-16 A20-686 was flown to Tocumwal for disposal.

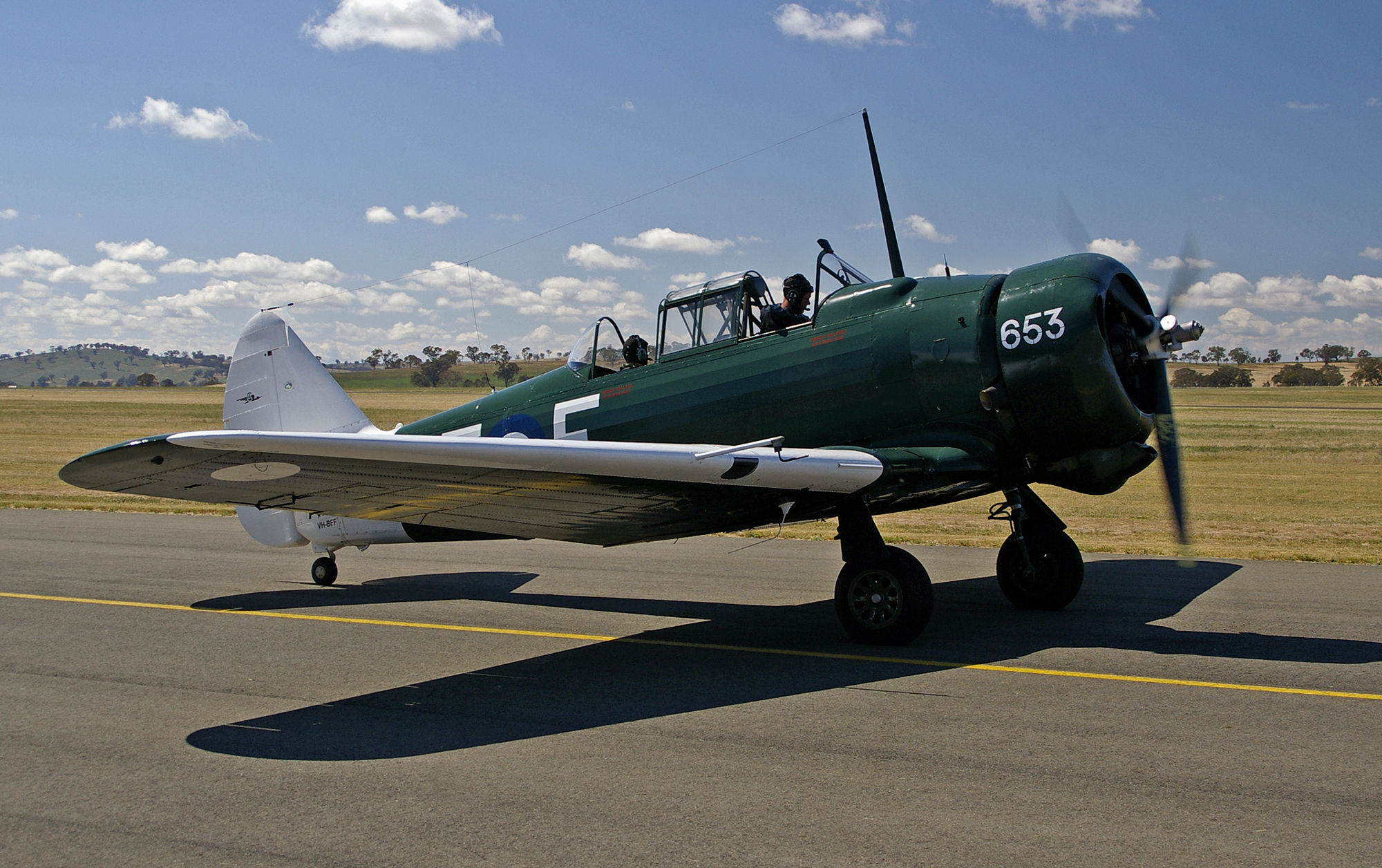
A surviving CA-16 Wirraway operating as a warbird

In 1954, Super Spread Aviation, based at Moorabbin Airport, bought two CA-16 Wirraways and modified them to perform aerial application operations. Both were almost brand-new, one having flown 9 hours and the other 12 hours; the modifications included the fitment of a hopper and spraying equipment. In a reflection of much of what was asked of the type during wartime, the two aircraft proved to be inadequate for the task and both were de-registered on 10 April 1956 and later scrapped. Despite the scrapping of these two aircraft and hundreds of others, a healthy number of Wirraways survive today, in aviation museums in Australia, Papua New Guinea and in the United States; and with 10 on the Australian civil aircraft register in 2011; either flying or under restoration to fly as warbirds. A Wirraway being operated as a warbird crashed during an airshow at Nowra in 1999, killing the two occupants.

== Variants ==
CA-1 "Mk I"
Initial contract variant. 40 built.
CA-3 "Mk II"
Improved CA-1, ordered by AWC under new contract. Known additionally as Mark II's until CA-9 model. 60 built.
CA-5
32 built.
CA-7
100 built.
CA-8
200 built.
CA-9
188 built.
CA-10
Planned dive-bomber version. None built.
CA-10A
Contract to modify and install dive brakes to existing Wirraway aircraft. 17 Modified.
CA-16 "Mk III"
Improved performance, bombload and addition of dive brakes. 135 built.
CA-20
Contract for dive-bomber variant. Cancelled.

== Operators ==
Australia

- Royal Australian Air Force
  - No. 4 Squadron RAAF
  - No. 5 Squadron RAAF
  - No. 12 Squadron RAAF
  - No. 21 Squadron RAAF
  - No. 22 Squadron RAAF
  - No. 23 Squadron RAAF
  - No. 24 Squadron RAAF
  - No. 25 Squadron RAAF
  - No. 60 Squadron RAAF
- Royal Australian Navy Fleet Air Arm
  - No. 723 Squadron RAN
  - No. 724 Squadron RAN

United Kingdom

- Royal Air Force
  - 'Y' Squadron RAF in Malaya 1941–1942, ex-21 Squadron RAAF aircraft

United States

- United States Army Air Forces
  - HQ Flight, Fifth Air Force

== Surviving aircraft ==
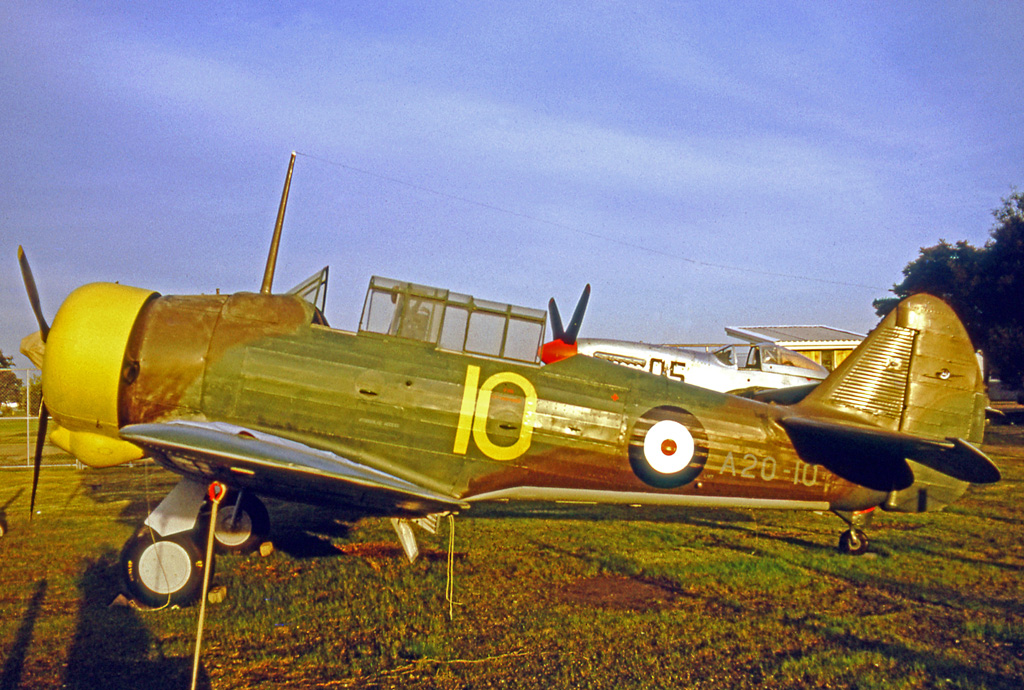
The oldest surviving Wirraway preserved at Moorabbin Airport Melbourne.

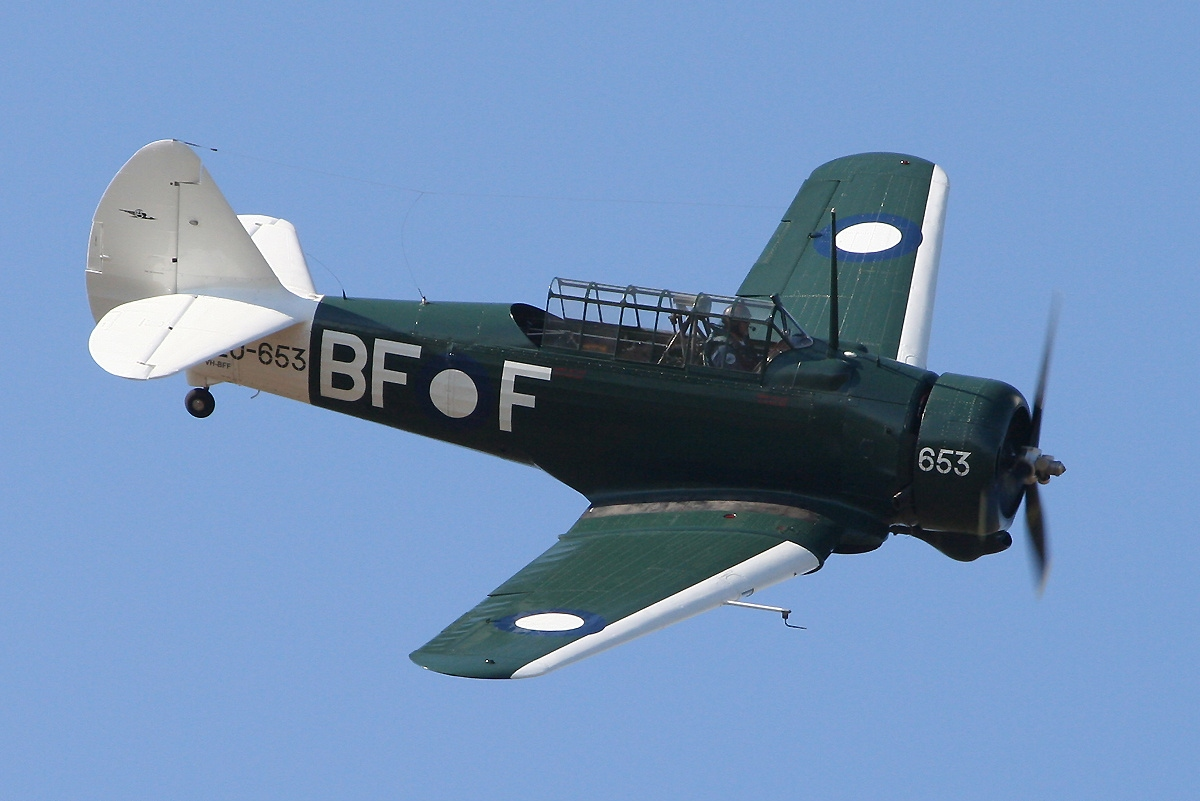
A20-653 at Temora Aviation Museum.

- A20-10 – CA-1 on static display at the Australian National Aviation Museum in Melbourne. This airframe is the eighth production and oldest surviving Wirraway.
- A20-13 – CA-1 in storage at the Papua New Guinea Museum in Port Moresby.
- A20-81 – CA-3 airworthy with Paul Bennet in Rutherford, New South Wales. It is painted as A20-176.
- A20-99 – CA-3 under restoration to airworthy with the Historical Aircraft Restoration Society in Wollongong.
- A20-103 – CA-5 on static display at the Australian War Memorial in Campbell, Australian Capital Territory.
- A20-511 – CA-9 on static display at the Ballarat Aviation Museum in Ballarat. It is painted as A20-502.
- A20-649 – CA-16 stored at the Fantasy of Flight in Polk City, Florida.
- A20-651 – CA-16 on static display at the Museum of Victoria in Melbourne.
- A20-652 – CA-16 airworthy at the Queensland Air Museum in Caloundra, Queensland.
- A20-653 – CA-16 airworthy at the Temora Aviation Museum in Temora, New South Wales. Ownership was transferred to the RAAF in July 2019 and it is operated by the Air Force Heritage Squadron (Temora Historic Flight).
- A20-656 – CA-16 under restoration by private owners.
- A20-685 – CA-16 on static display at the Camden Aviation Museum in Narellan. This private museum is currently not open to the public.
- A20-687 – CA-16 in storage at the RAAF Museum in Point Cook. It is painted as CA-9 A20-561.
- A20-688 – CA-16 on static display at the Aviation Heritage Museum in Bull Creek, Western Australia.
- A20-695 – CA-16 airworthy at the Caboolture Warplane Museum of Caboolture, Queensland.
- A20-704 – CA-16 under restoration to airworthy Fantasy of Flight in Polk City, Florida.
- A20-722 – CA-16 was airworthy with Borg Sorensen, now retired on static display at the Nhill Aviation Museum at Nhill, Victoria.

== Specifications (CAC Wirraway) ==
Data from Green

General characteristics

- Crew: 2
- Length: 27 ft 10 in (8.48 m)
- Wingspan: 43 ft 0 in (13.11 m)
- Height: 8 ft 8 3/4 in (2.661 m) excluding radio mast
- Wing area: 255.75 sq ft (23.760 m^{2})
- Empty weight: 3,992 lb (1,811 kg)
- Gross weight: 6,595 lb (2,991 kg)
- Powerplant: 1 × Pratt & Whitney R-1340 S1H1-G nine-cylinder air-cooled radial engine, 600 hp (450 kW)

Performance

- Maximum speed: 220 mph (350 km/h, 190 kn) at 5,000 ft (1,500 m)
- Cruise speed: 182 mph (293 km/h, 158 kn) at 5,000 ft (1,500 m)
- Range: 720 mi (1,160 km, 630 nmi) at 164 mph (143 kn; 264 km/h)
- Service ceiling: 23,000 ft (7,000 m)
- Rate of climb: 1,950 ft/min (9.9 m/s)

Armament

- Guns: 2 × 0.303 in (7.7 mm) Vickers Mk V machine guns synchronised to fire through the propeller arc and 1 × 0.303 in (7.7 mm) Vickers GO machine gun on a flexible mount in the rear cockpit. Later versions had no Vickers Mk V guns, but had provision for 2 × 0.303 (7.7 mm) Browning Mk II machine guns mounted under the outer wing panels.
- Bombs: The Wirraway is fitted with 18 bomb slips, allowing a wide range of bombs to be carried. Four electrically-actuated Universal Carriers are fitted inside the outer wings, capable of carrying up to 500 lb (230 kg) of bombs in normal situations or 1,000 lb (450 kg) in overload situations. Six electrically-actuated Light Series Carriers are fitted inside the centre section, capable of carrying up to 40 lb (18 kg) each. Eight mechanically-actuated slips are also mounted under the wing centre section, capable of carrying up to 100 lb (45 kg) each. Bomb loads can include the following:
  - 4 × 250 lb (113 kg) bombs or
  - 2 × 500 lb (227 kg) bombs (A20-32 onwards) or
  - 4 × 100 lb (45 kg) bombs or
  - 12 × 8.5 lb (3.9 kg) or 11.5 lb (5.2 kg) bombs and 8 × marker flares

== See also ==
Related development

- CAC Boomerang
- CAC Ceres
- North American NA-16
- North American T-6 Texan

Aircraft of comparable role, configuration, and era

- Tachikawa Ki-36/Ki-55

Related lists

- List of aircraft of the Royal Australian Air Force
- List of fighter aircraft
