= No. 4 Operational Training Unit RAAF =

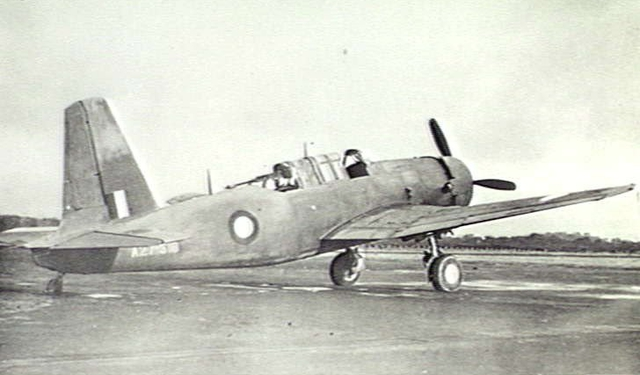
- Vultee Vengeance dive bomber at Williamtown, c. 1943
- Active: 1942–44
- Country: Australia
- Branch: Royal Australian Air Force
- Role: Operational training
- Garrison/HQ: Williamtown, New South Wales
- Engagements: World War II

Aircraft flown
- Bomber: Vultee Vengeance
- Trainer: CAC Wirraway

No. 4 Operational Training Unit (No. 4 OTU) was an operational conversion unit of the Royal Australian Air Force during World War II. It was formed at Williamtown, New South Wales, in October 1942 to train pilots and Wireless air gunners to operate Vultee Vengeance dive bombers. The school was equipped with Vengeances and CAC Wirraway aircraft. Accidents were common in operational conversion units, and No. 4 OTU suffered several fatal crashes during its existence. It was disbanded in April 1944, handing Williamtown over to No. 5 Operational Training Unit.

== History ==
During World War II, the Royal Australian Air Force (RAAF) established eight operational training units (OTUs) to convert recently graduated air crews from advanced trainers to combat aircraft, and to add fighting ability to the flying skills they had already learned. No. 4 Operational Training Unit was formed on 1 October 1942 at Williamtown, New South Wales, to convert crews to the Vultee Vengeance dive bomber, 400 of which had been ordered by the RAAF (344 were eventually delivered). No. 4 OTU's inaugural commanding officer was Wing Commander E.G. Fyfe. The first pilots and Wireless air gunner trainees arrived from No. 12 Squadron on 28 October 1942, and undertook a Vengeance conversion course that ran until 25 November. By the end of the month, No. 4 OTU's strength stood at seven Vengeances. These were augmented in January 1943 by the unit's first CAC Wirraway, which students flew before commencing their Vengeance conversion course.

OTUs, employing as they did warplanes that were more advanced and more powerful than trainers, and teaching combat techniques that often carried high risk, generally suffered higher accident rates than other flying training schools. On 3 March 1943, a Wirraway of No. 4 OTU crashed near Williamtown, killing both crewmen. Two others died when their Vengeance crashed and burned near Goulburn during a cross-country exercise on 4 August. On 16 August, a Vengeance flew into trees after apparently pulling out late from a dive, resulting in two fatalities. A Vengeance blew up in flight during dive-bombing practice at Williamtown on 14 September, killing both crewmen. On 5 October, a Vengeance on a dive-bombing exercise crashed into the sea near Newcastle; both crewmen were reported as missing, believed killed. No. 4 OTU suffered two more fatalities when a Vengeance struck a hill near Braidwood during a cross-country flight on 26 November 1943. Another Vengeance hit the water and exploded in Nelson Bay on 7 April 1944 after failing to recover from a dive, killing the two-man crew.

On 1 December 1943, Squadron Leader R.E. Bell took over command of No. 4 OTU on a temporary basis, handing over to Flight Lieutenant R. Tuel-Wilkinson on 27 April 1944. The Vengeances had meanwhile been withdrawn from operations in the South West Pacific theatre, having flown their last combat mission on 8 March. No. 4 OTU disbanded on 30 April 1944; a small detachment remained to hand over the Williamtown base to an advance party of No. 5 OTU the following day. The rest of No. 5 OTU transferred from Tocumwal to Williamtown during July. By the time No. 4 OTU disbanded, the school's Vengeances had accumulated 7,593 flying hours and the Wirraways 7,646 hours.

== See also ==
- Vultee Vengeance in Australian service
