= No. 5 Operational Training Unit RAAF =

Royal Australian Air Force training unit

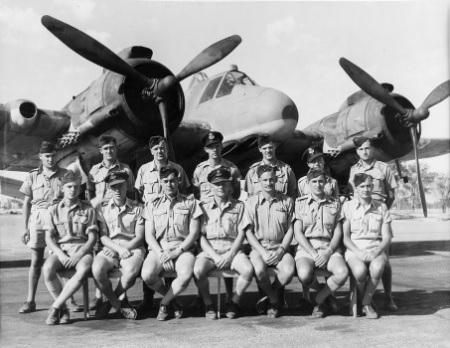
- Graduates of No. 12 Course at No. 5 OTU in 1943
- Active: 1942–47; 1970–71
- Country: Australia
- Branch: Royal Australian Air Force
- Role: Operational training
- Garrison/HQ: Forest Hill, New South Wales (1942–43); Tocumwal, New South Wales (1943–44); Williamtown, New South Wales (1944–47, 1970–71)
- Engagements: World War II

Commanders
- Notable commanders: Dick Cresswell (1947)

Aircraft flown
- Bomber: Bristol Beaufort; Douglas Boston de Havilland Mosquito
- Fighter: Bristol Beaufighter; P-51 Mustang; CAC Sabre
- Trainer: Airspeed Oxford; CAC Wirraway de Havilland Vampire; Macchi MB-326

No. 5 Operational Training Unit was an operational training unit (OTU) of the Royal Australian Air Force. It was formed at Wagga Wagga, New South Wales, in October 1942 to train pilots and navigators for service in World War II. The unit was initially equipped with Bristol Beauforts and Beaufighters, and later received Douglas Bostons and de Havilland Mosquitos, among other types. No. 5 OTU was transferred to Tocumwal in October 1943, and then to Williamtown in mid-1944. It was reorganised as a fighter conversion unit flying P-51 Mustangs and CAC Wirraways in February 1946, and disbanded in July 1947.

No. 5 OTU was re-raised at Williamtown in April 1970 as a jet fighter conversion unit, equipped with CAC Sabres, de Havilland Vampires, and Macchi MB-326s. It ceased operations in July the following year, when the Sabre was retired from service.

== History ==
=== World War II ===
During World War II, the Royal Australian Air Force (RAAF) established several operational training units (OTUs) to convert recently graduated pilots from advanced trainers to combat aircraft, and to add fighting ability to the flying skills they had already learned. Employing as they did warplanes that were more advanced and more powerful than trainers, and teaching combat techniques that often carried high risk, OTUs generally suffered higher accident rates than other flying training schools. No. 5 Operational Training Unit was formed at Forest Hill in Wagga Wagga, New South Wales, on 26 October 1942, and initially equipped with two Bristol Beauforts and five Bristol Beaufighters. Its inaugural commanding officer was Squadron Leader Bruce Rose. The first training course ran from 2 November to 12 December 1942. At the end of the month the unit's strength was 170 personnel and sixteen aircraft. By mid-1943 this had increased to 387 personnel, including seventeen members of the Women's Auxiliary Australian Air Force, and twenty-five aircraft, including four de Havilland DH-84s and one de Havilland Moth Minor, the remainder being Beauforts and Beaufighters. The unit received its first Airspeed Oxford in August 1943.

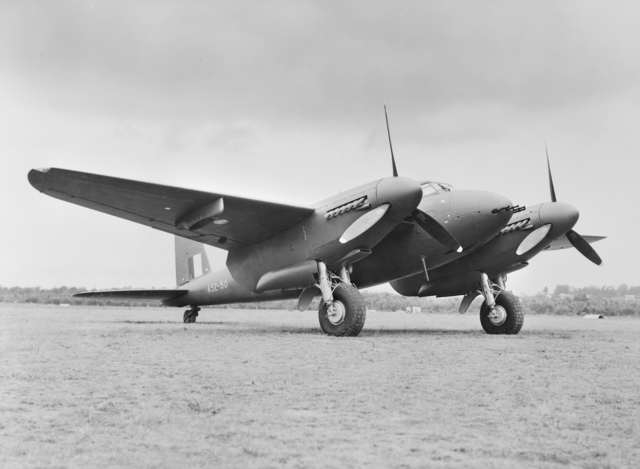
Mosquito bomber of No. 5 OTU, c. 1945

By the time No. 5 OTU relocated to Tocumwal, New South Wales, on 20 October 1943, it had begun running courses on Douglas Bostons. Its first de Havilland Mosquito arrived the following month. As of April 1944, the unit had a complement of sixty-three aircraft, including five Mosquitos. It ran conversion courses for experienced pilots and navigators, as well as training courses for newer aircrew.

An advance party from No. 5 OTU arrived at Williamtown, New South Wales, on 1 May 1944 and accepted handover of the base from a small detachment of personnel formerly of No. 4 Operational Training Unit, which had disbanded there the previous day. The rest of No. 5 OTU transferred to Williamtown during July. The unit commenced photo reconnaissance courses in August, and by October its strength was over 1,000 personnel. Mosquito fighter ace Charles Scherf briefly served as chief flying instructor in late 1944. November was marred by four fatal accidents in the space of three days.

No. 5 OTU had thirty crews under training in January 1945, compared to a dozen in November 1942. By this time its complement of aircraft had increased to seventy-five, including twenty-eight Mosquitos. Staffing reached its highest level of 1,700 personnel in May. Ace Charles Crombie was the unit's chief flying instructor when he was killed in a Beaufighter crash at Williamtown on 26 August 1945. One of his fellow instructors at the time was Flight Lieutenant Charles "Bud" Tingwell. Leading Aircraftman Jack Brabham, then an engine mechanic at No. 5 OTU, witnessed Crombie's accident. The end of hostilities in the Pacific saw the dissolution of all the RAAF's OTUs. On 1 February 1946, No. 5 OTU was reorganised as a crew conversion unit, CCU (Fighter), operating North American P-51 Mustangs and CAC Wirraways. Trainees were schooled in bombing and gunnery for eventual service with No. 81 Wing, comprising three RAAF Mustang squadrons, as part of the British Commonwealth Occupation Force in Japan. Wing Commander Dick Cresswell served initially as chief instructor and later as commanding officer. By February 1947 the CCU had a complement of twenty-eight aircraft and just under a hundred personnel. Activity began winding down in May, and the unit was disbanded on 7 July 1947.

=== Re-establishment ===
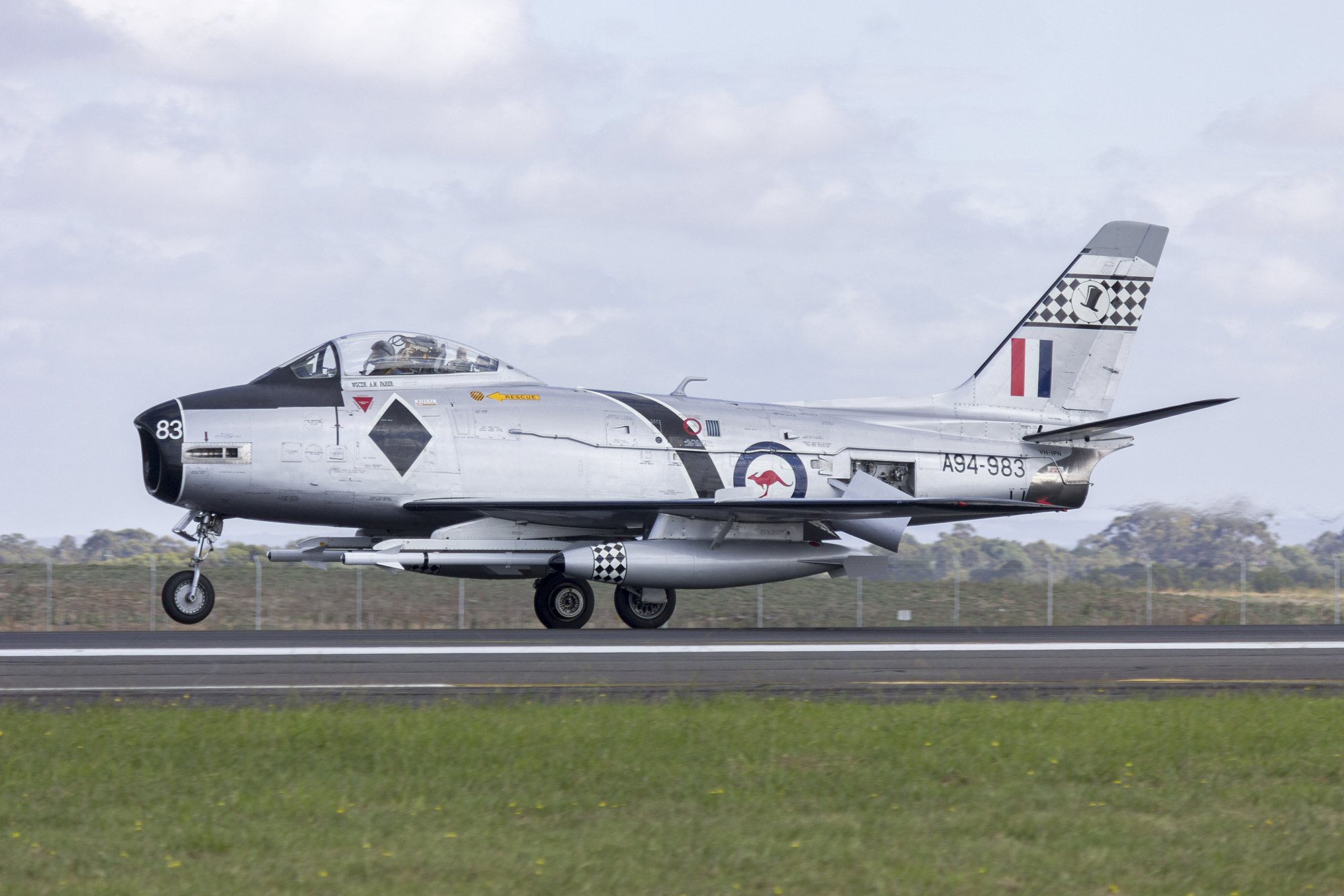
Sabre A94-983, formerly operated by No. 5 OTU, landing at Avalon Airport, Victoria, in 2015

No. 5 OTU was re-formed at Williamtown on 1 April 1970 to provide pilots with operational training prior to their conversion to the Dassault Mirage III fighter. The unit's reactivation was celebrated with a dinner attended by its original commanding officer, Bruce Rose, and a flypast of forty-nine aircraft from No. 2 Operational Conversion Unit (OCU). No. 5 OTU was divided into instructional and operational flights, and conducted training in concert with Mirages from No. 2 OCU and No. 76 Squadron. Its aircraft also participated in joint exercises and display flights, including air shows celebrating the RAAF's 1971 golden jubilee. The unit was equipped with forty CAC Sabre jet fighters, some de Havilland Vampire jet trainers, and eight Macchi MB-326s previously operated by No. 2 OCU for lead-in fighter training. Vampire operations began winding down in September 1970, and the type was withdrawn in April 1971.

The last Sabre conversion course was completed in December 1970. Early the following year, the Australian government announced that the Sabres were to be phased out and retired by July 1971. At this time RAAF fighter pilots were trained progressively on the CAC Winjeel, Macchi, Sabre and Mirage, but after considering the feasibility of direct Macchi-to-Mirage conversion, and the impracticability of maintaining the ageing Sabres, the government determined that it was possible to remove the Sabre from the process and retire the type, on the proviso that more Mirage trainers were made available; it subsequently approved the purchase of six new Mirage IIID dual trainers to augment the ten already in service. No. 5 OTU was disbanded on 31 July 1971, the date the Sabre was retired from RAAF service. The unit's Macchis were transferred back to No. 2 OCU.

Following No. 5 OTU's disbandment, one of its Sabres, A94-983, was among several donated by the Australian government to the Royal Malaysian Air Force. The aircraft was returned to the RAAF in 1978, and subsequently put on display at RAAF Bases Richmond, New South Wales, and Point Cook, Victoria. In 2005 the RAAF loaned it to the Temora Aviation Museum, New South Wales, where it was restored to flying condition.

== Commanding officers ==
No. 5 OTU was commanded by the following officers:

From	Name
26 October 1942	Squadron Leader B.F. Rose
21 June 1943	Wing Commander B.R. Walker
28 June 1944	Wing Commander W.E. Townsend
11 June 1946	Wing Commander A.D. Henderson
29 March 1947	Wing Commander R.C. Cresswell
1 April 1970	Wing Commander P.G. Larard
19 October 1970	Wing Commander D.C. Stenhouse
