= No. 12 Squadron RAAF =

Royal Australian Air Force squadron

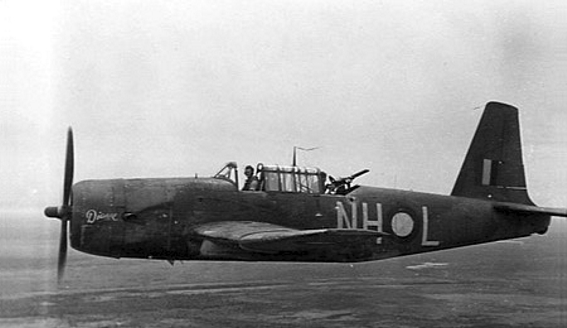
- A No. 12 Squadron Vengeance in 1943
- Active: 1939–1948; 1973–1989; 2025–Present
- Country: Australia
- Branch: Royal Australian Air Force
- Role: General purpose (1939–1943); Bomber (1943–1948); Transport (1973–1989); Maritime patrol (2025–present)
- Mottos: "We roam and we charge"
- Engagements: World War II

Commanders
- Notable commanders: Charles Eaton (1939–1940)

Insignia
- Squadron code: M, NH

Aircraft flown
- Bomber: Anson, Vengeance, Liberator, Lincoln
- Fighter: Demon
- Helicopter: Chinook
- Patrol: P-8A Poseidon
- Trainer: Wirraway

No. 12 Squadron is a Royal Australian Air Force (RAAF) maritime patrol squadron based at RAAF Base Edinburgh, South Australia. It has previously been tasked as a general purpose, bomber and transport squadron at various times. The squadron was originally formed in 1939 and saw combat in the South West Pacific theatre of World War II. From 1941 to 1943, it mainly conducted maritime patrols off northern Australia. The squadron was based at Merauke in western New Guinea from November 1943 to July 1944, when it was withdrawn from operations. After being re-equipped, it operated as a heavy bomber unit from February 1945 until the end of the war. The squadron continued in this role until it was redesignated No. 1 Squadron RAAF in February 1948. The squadron was reformed in 1973 to operate transport helicopters but was again disbanded in 1989. The squadron was again reformed in 2025 to operate the Boeing P-8 Poseidon aircraft.

== History ==
=== World War II ===
No. 12 Squadron was formed as a general purpose unit at RAAF Base Laverton on 6 February 1939 under the command of Squadron Leader Charles Eaton. The squadron was initially equipped with four Hawker Demon biplane fighters and four Avro Anson maritime reconnaissance aircraft and commenced intensive training in May. No. 12 Squadron began to move to Darwin in July 1939, with its advance party arriving there on the 24th of the month. The squadron was the first RAAF unit to be permanently based in the Northern Territory and was initially stationed at Darwin's civil aerodrome. Seven No. 12 Squadron Ansons were based in Darwin by late August, and these began flying reconnaissance patrols on the last day of the month. The Demons were replaced with CAC Wirraway general purpose aircraft at Laverton on 1 September, and all of the squadron's aircraft had arrived in Darwin by 17 September. The squadron's flying was reduced during September and October to make personnel available to improve the aerodrome's facilities, but by the end of October it had returned to normal operations. These included escorting shipping, maritime reconnaissance and coastal patrols.

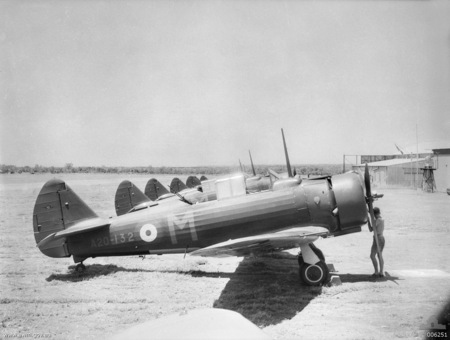
No. 12 Squadron Wirraways at Darwin in January 1941

The squadron experienced considerable changes in 1940 and 1941. During the early months of 1940, its activities were expanded to include gunnery and bombing training and a No. 9 Squadron Supermarine Seagull was attached to the unit to assist with air gunnery practice. On 1 June No. 12 Squadron was split to form RAAF Station Darwin and No. 13 Squadron. As part of this reorganisation the squadron's headquarters became the RAAF Station's headquarters, Eaton, who was by now a Wing Commander, was appointed the commander of the station and all of the Ansons were transferred to No. 13 Squadron; only No. 12 Squadron's 'C' Flight remained with the unit. The squadron continued to conduct anti-submarine and maritime patrols and began a program of exercises with Royal Australian Navy and Australian Army units based at Darwin from July 1940. No. 12 Squadron relocated to the new military airfield in Darwin in April 1941 and reached a strength of 18 Wirraways in May. The squadron increased its flying in the later months of 1941 as war with Japan became increasingly likely.

Following the outbreak of the Pacific War on 8 December 1941 (local time), No. 12 Squadron was dispersed between two air bases; the squadron's 'B' and 'C' flights were transferred to Batchelor Airfield while 'A' flight returned to the civil aerodrome. On 12 December, the unit had a strength of 18 Wirraways but was down to 14 aircraft by mid-February 1942. Two of the aircraft based at Darwin were destroyed on the ground in the devastating first Japanese air raid on Darwin which took place on 19 February 1942. The squadron also lost a considerable portion of its stores when a new hangar was destroyed at the civil aerodrome in this raid. Following the attack, No. 12 Squadron's surviving aircraft dropped supplies to the survivors of sunken ships and conducted patrols of the area around Darwin. It was stationed at Pell Airfield from 15 July – 16 September 1942 while Batchelor was being used by United States Army Air Forces (USAAF) units.

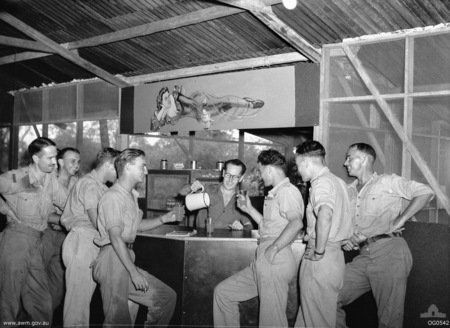
No. 12 Squadron aircrew in the bar of the aircrew mess at Merauke

No. 12 Squadron began to be re-equipped with Vultee Vengeance dive bombers from October 1942. The squadron was the first unit in the South West Pacific Area (SWPA) to receive these aircraft and their arrival was popular with the squadron's personnel as it was believed that the Vengeances would allow them to play an active part in the war. This did not eventuate, however, and No. 12 Squadron continued its routine program of patrols after all the Vengeances had arrived. The only exception to this was a bombing raid conducted on 18 June 1943 by twelve of the squadron's Vengeances against villages on Selaru in the Tanimbar Islands which were believed to house workers employed by the Japanese to build a new airstrip. This was the first attack to be conducted by Vengeances in the SWPA.

In May 1943, No. 12 Squadron was ordered to move to Merauke in western New Guinea, where it would come under the command of No. 72 Wing. The squadron's 270-man strong advance party arrived in Merauke on 8 July but found that no facilities had been constructed for the unit. As a result, its aircraft were stationed at Cooktown, Queensland, where they were used for anti-submarine patrols and the escort of shipping. No. 12 Squadron gradually moved to Merauke between September and November 1943, and continued to be employed mainly in maritime patrols. The squadron's only contact with the Japanese during its period at Merauke took place on 9 October when a Vengeance unsuccessfully attacked a float plane.

In July 1944, No. 12 Squadron moved to Strathpine, Queensland, where it was reduced to cadre status ahead of being converted to a heavy bomber unit. The squadron moved to Cecil Plains in December and began to be reequipped with Consolidated B-24 Liberator heavy bombers on 5 February 1945. No. 12 Squadron began to move to Darwin in late March 1945 and became operational there in early May. It flew its first heavy bomber operation on 24 May and attacked three Japanese ships on 26 May, setting one of them on fire. The squadron continued to attack Japanese shipping and installations in the Timor Sea, Banda Sea and Arafura Sea areas in conjunction with No. 21 and No. 24 Squadrons until the end of the war. During this period the squadron initially suffered from a shortage of spare parts but this was rectified after the unit gained access to USAAF spares at Biak. From July, No. 12 and No. 99 Squadrons formed part of No. 85 Wing. The squadron's last bombing raid was conducted against a barracks at Kendari on 10 August and it dropped leaflets over Borneo and the Netherlands East Indies later in August to inform civilians of the Japanese surrender. Following this its Liberators dropped food and medical supplies to Allied prisoners of war (POW) and later repatriated POWs to Australia. In February 1946 No. 12 Squadron became a transport unit, though it only continued in this role until March when it moved to RAAF Base Amberley and became a lodger unit of No. 3 Aircraft Depot. No. 12 Squadron suffered 27 fatalities during World War II.

In June 1947, No. 12 Squadron's aircrew moved to RAAF Base East Sale to begin conversion training for Avro Lincoln heavy bombers. The squadron continued operating these aircraft until 22 February 1948 when it was redesignated No. 1 Squadron.

=== Helicopter squadron ===
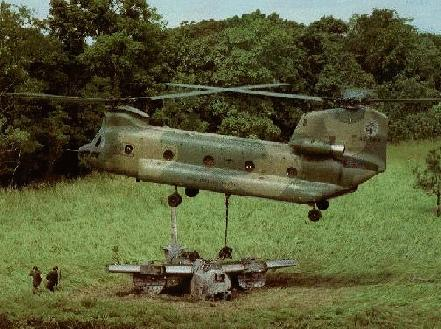
A No. 12 Squadron Chinook picking-up a Boston bomber in Papua New Guinea

No. 12 Squadron was re-formed at Amberley on 3 September 1973 to fly the RAAF's twelve new CH-47C Chinook helicopters. The helicopters were shipped from the United States to Brisbane on board the aircraft carrier HMAS Melbourne, and arrived in Australia in March 1974. The squadron made its first flight in the aircraft on 8 July 1974, and was declared operational with the type in December that year. The Chinooks were primarily used to support Australian Army units based in northern Australia, though they also occasionally conducted air-sea rescues, provided flood relief and performed a range of other tasks in support of the civil authorities. Unusual tasks included placing lighthouses in isolated locations and air conditioning plants on the roofs of tall buildings and supporting police anti-narcotics operations. In late August 1980 one of No. 12 Squadron's Chinooks flew from Amberley to Malaysia to recover a crashed Royal Malaysian Air Force S-61 Nuri helicopter; this was the longest helicopter deployment undertaken by the RAAF to that time.

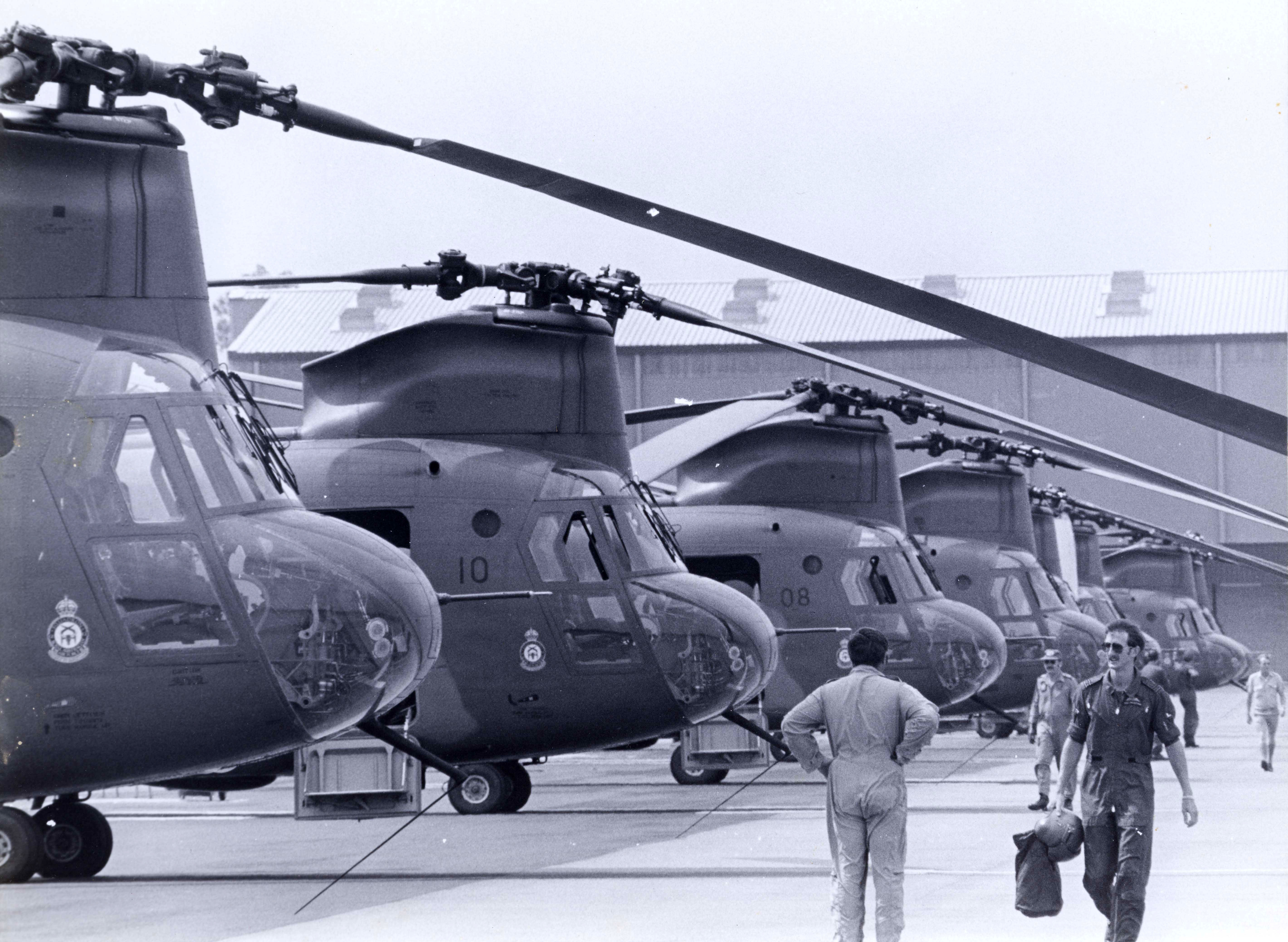
A Flight Line of 12 Squadron Chinooks at Amberley.

Due to the need to reduce defence expenditure, the Australian government decided to retire the Chinook helicopters in 1989. Following the retirement of the Chinooks on 30 June 1989, No. 12 Squadron was disbanded on 25 August 1989. While it was hoped that the Army's new S-70A Blackhawk helicopters could fulfill some of the Chinook's roles, this was not successful. As a result, four of the ex-RAAF CH-47Cs were upgraded to CH-47D standard and assigned to 'C' Squadron of the Army's 5th Aviation Regiment from 1995.

=== Maritime patrol ===
No. 12 Squadron was re-raised in October 2025 to operate Boeing P-8 Poseidon maritime patrol aircraft. It is based at RAAF Base Edinburgh and operates alongside No. 11 Squadron, which is also equipped with Poseidons. The squadron commenced flying operations in January 2026.

== See also ==
- Vultee Vengeance in Australian service
