= Vultee Vengeance in Australian service =

Royal Australian Air Force dive bombers during World War II

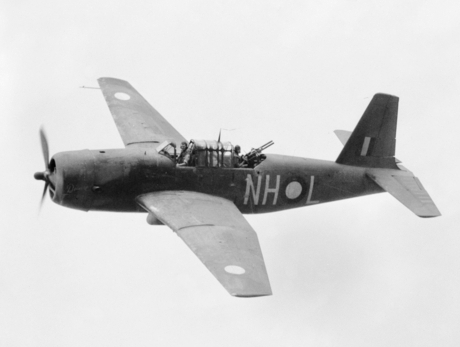
- A Vultee Vengeance of No. 12 Squadron in December 1943

General information
- Type: Dive bomber
- National origin: United States
- Manufacturer: Vultee Aircraft
- Primary users: Royal Australian Air Force Royal Australian Navy

History
- In service: 1942–1946

The Royal Australian Air Force (RAAF) operated Vultee Vengeance dive bombers during World War II. The Australian Government ordered 297 of the type in late 1941 as part of efforts to expand the RAAF. This order was later increased to 400 aircraft. A few Vengeances arrived in Australia during 1942, and large-scale deliveries commenced in early 1943; further orders were cancelled in 1944 after 342 had been delivered.

The RAAF was slow to bring its Vengeances into service, their first combat missions being flown in June 1943. The main deployment of the type took place between mid-January and early March 1944, when squadrons operated in support of Australian and United States Army forces in New Guinea. This force was withdrawn after only six weeks as the Vengeance was considered inferior to other aircraft available to the Allied air forces. All of the RAAF's five Vengeance-equipped squadrons were re-equipped with Consolidated B-24 Liberator heavy bombers. Vengeances continued to be used in training and support roles with the RAAF until 1946, and some were transferred to the Royal Australian Navy for ground training between 1948 and 1950.

Historians' assessments of the Vengeance's career in Australian service differ. While there is consensus that the type was obsolete, some argue that it nevertheless proved successful. Others, including the RAAF's Air Power Development Centre, have judged that the Vengeance's performance was mixed and the type was not suited to Australia's requirements.

== Acquisition ==
The Vultee Vengeance was a dive bomber designed and built in the United States. It was crewed by a pilot and another airman who served as both a radio operator and rear gunner. Vultee developed the type in the late 1930s for the export market, orders being placed by Brazil, China, France, Turkey and the Soviet Union. In 1940, during the early months of World War II, Britain's Royal Air Force (RAF) took over the French order for 700 aircraft, before the prototype had flown. Flight testing began in July 1941. The United States Army Air Forces (USAAF) ordered another 300 Vengeances for the RAF under the terms of the Lend-Lease program. Following the United States' entry in the war the USAAF re-possessed at least 243 Vengeances, but never used them operationally as it considered the type inferior to its other attack aircraft and unfit for combat. Several RAF squadrons equipped with the Vengeance saw combat during the Burma Campaign. The type proved successful in this theatre, but was soon withdrawn from service.

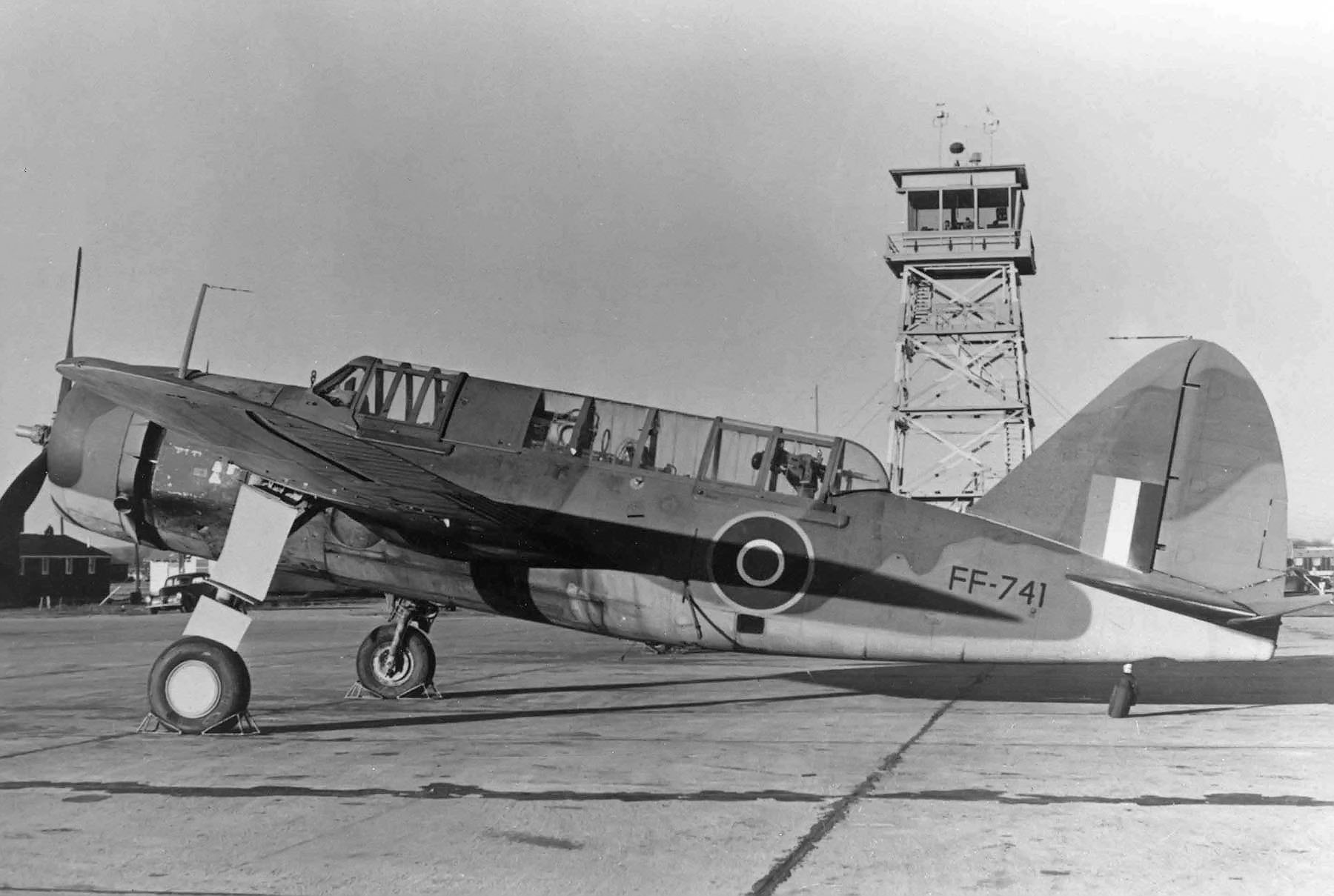
A Brewster Bermuda; the RAAF's order for this type was replaced by the order for Vengeances

In mid-1940 the Australian Government placed an order for 243 Brewster Bermuda dive bombers for the RAAF. This type was still under development, and the program to produce it experienced repeated delays. On 28 September 1941 the British Government offered to provide Vultee Vengeances from its allocation if the RAAF considered them suitable. The Australian War Cabinet authorised the purchase of 297 Vultee Vengeances on 22 October 1941 and cancelled the Bermuda order. By March 1942, the order had been slightly increased to 300 aircraft, of which 57 were to be provided by the United States Government under Lend-Lease and the other 243 paid for by the Australian Government. Australia eventually ordered 400 Vengeances. The price for each of the aircraft purchased by Australia was A£90,000.

Deliveries of the Vengeances to Australia were much delayed. Following Australia's entry into Pacific War in December 1941, the RAAF order still stood at 297 Vengeances. These aircraft were scheduled to be delivered between January and December 1942. No Vengeances had arrived by 8 May 1942, though the RAAF's order had been increased to 367. A small number of the type arrived in Australia in late May 1942, but subsequent deliveries were slow. This was because the USAAF was also rapidly expanding at this time, which limited the number and types of aircraft available to its allies. Attempts by the Australian Government to obtain Vengeances from USAAF allocations in March 1942, when the country faced a possible Japanese invasion, were unsuccessful. In April that year the Minister for External Affairs H. V. Evatt visited Washington, D.C. to lobby for increased allocations of aircraft. The US Government agreed to provide 475 aircraft, including some Vengeances. Evatt was not concerned with the types of aircraft which were delivered, and the Australian Government was willing to accept aircraft the US military judged unsuitable for its own needs.

The majority of the dive bombers arrived after April 1943; by this time the threat of invasion had passed. Overall, Australia received 15 Vengeances in 1942, 227 in 1943 and 100 during 1944. Many of the aircraft required maintenance upon arrival as they had already been used by the American military or suffered from defects. This led to delays in introducing them into service, and caused the type to have a relatively low serviceability rate.

Three different models of the Vengeance were acquired by the RAAF: 99 Mark I aircraft (given serial numbers A27-1 to A27-99), 122 Mark IIs (A27-200 to A27-321) and 121 Mark IVs (A27-500/549, A27-560/566 and A27-600/640). The Marks I and II differed only in that they were built by Northrop and Vultee respectively, and were continuations of the British orders. These variants of the Vengeance were armed with six 0.303 calibre M1919 Browning machine guns (two mounted in each wing, and a pair in the rear cockpit) and powered by a Wright R-2600-A5 engine. The Mark IV variant was designed to meet USAAF standards. It was armed with six 0.5 calibre M2 Browning machine guns in the same configuration as Marks I and II, and used the more powerful Wright R-2600-13 engine. All of the variants could carry up to 2,000 pounds (910 kg) of bombs.

== Entry into service ==
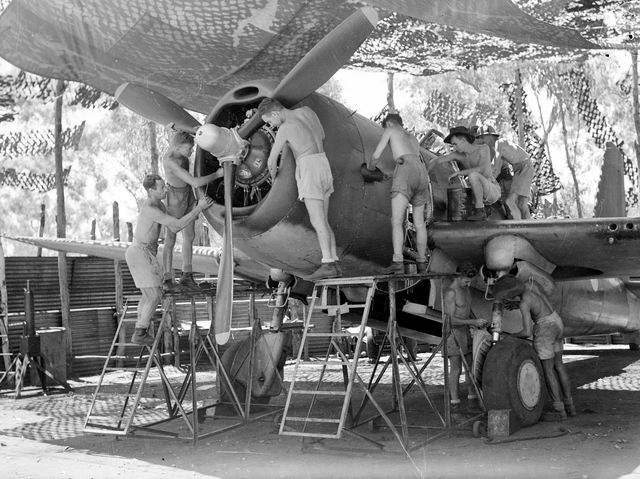
A No. 12 Squadron Vengeance being serviced during April 1943

Five frontline RAAF units were equipped with Vengeance dive bombers: Nos. 12, 21, 23, 24 and 25 Squadrons. No. 12 Squadron was the first Vengeance unit, replacing its CAC Wirraways with the type at Batchelor, Northern Territory, in September 1942. The same month, No. 21 Squadron was re-formed at Gawler, South Australia, equipped with Vengeances. No. 25 Squadron, located at RAAF Station Pearce in Western Australia, received some Vengeances in late 1942, but mainly operated Wirraways until being completely re-equipped with the dive bombers in August 1943. This squadron was the only RAAF unit to be equipped with Mark IV aircraft, which provided far superior performance to the other variants. The next unit to receive Vengeances was No. 24 Squadron, which transitioned to the type at Bankstown, New South Wales, between May and August 1943. The final combat unit to receive Vengeances was No. 23 Squadron, which began its conversion in June 1943 at Lowood, Queensland. While preparing for combat, Vengeance aircraft were at times used to counter attacks on shipping off the Australian coast; on 18 June 1943, four aircraft from No. 24 Squadron and a pair from No. 23 Squadron were held at readiness to strike the submarine that had attacked Convoy GP55 off Smoky Cape if it was located by patrolling Avro Ansons.

Two training units also operated the Vengeance. No. 2 Operational Training Unit received several of the type in 1942. On 1 October 1942, No. 4 Operational Training Unit (No. 4 OTU) was formed at RAAF Station Williamtown to train aircrews to operate the Vengeance in combat. The unit began its first operational conversion training course on 28 October that year. No. 4 OTU's fleet of Vengeances was augmented with several Wirraways in January 1943; from this time crews began their training on the simple-to-operate Wirraway before progressing onto the Vengeance. Two of the dive bombers were destroyed in flying accidents during August and September 1943, resulting in the deaths of their crews.

Despite the rapid expansion of the Vengeance force, by late 1942 the RAAF was aware that the type was obsolete and other Allied air forces' experiences had demonstrated that dive bombing was an inefficient tactic. Combat experience in Europe showed that dedicated dive bombers were highly vulnerable to attack from fighter aircraft, especially when preparing to dive on targets. Few USAAF officers regarded dive bombers as effective, though they were frequently used by the United States Navy. A USAAF squadron equipped with Douglas A-24 Banshee dive bombers was deployed to New Guinea in April 1942, but was withdrawn from combat at the end of May that year after flying only a few combat sorties. The USAAF regarded this type as unsuited to conditions in the theatre, though the US Navy operated it very successfully from its aircraft carriers as the Douglas SBD Dauntless. The USAAF preferred to use fighter-bombers and light bombers to support ground troops in New Guinea. Fighter-bombers were considered particularly useful as they could strafe and skip bomb Japanese positions as well as employ dive-bombing tactics. Similarly, by late 1942 the RAAF preferred to use the light bombers that it was now beginning to receive to provide tactical support for the Army. An order for 150 Curtiss Shrike dive bombers was cancelled after the first ten of these aircraft were delivered to Australia in November 1942, making the Vengeance the only dedicated dive bomber operated by the RAAF.

== Operational service ==
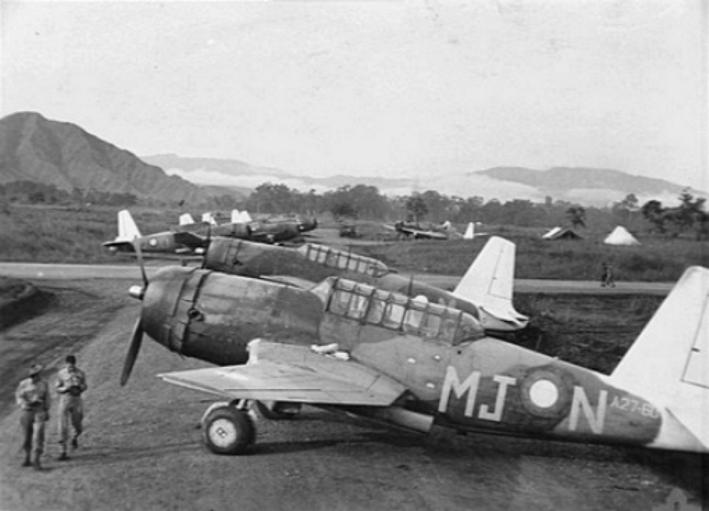
Vengeance dive bombers assigned to No. 21 Squadron at Nadzab aerodrome in New Guinea during February 1944

=== No. 12 Squadron ===
No. 12 Squadron was the first Vengeance-equipped RAAF unit to see combat. After converting to the dive bomber, the squadron was used on routine patrol and search-and-rescue tasks off the coast of the Northern Territory. On 18 June 1943, twelve Vengeances from the squadron, escorted by six No. 31 Squadron Bristol Beaufighters, were dispatched to attack two villages on Selaru island in the occupied Netherlands East Indies that were believed to be housing workers engaged in constructing an airfield. This operation was successful, and all the dive bombers returned to base.

In July 1943 the squadron began moving from Darwin to Merauke in Netherlands New Guinea, where it was to operate as part of No. 72 Wing. A party of 270 ground crew arrived at Merauke early that month, but little of the infrastructure needed to support the unit's aircraft was ready. As a result, No. 12 Squadron's Vengeances and air crew were stationed at Cooktown, Queensland, from where they conducted anti-submarine patrols and escorted shipping. The aircraft were redeployed to Merauke over the course of September, and began regular patrol duties on the 28th of the month. No. 12 Squadron's only combat during this deployment occurred on 9 October 1943, when a Vengeance exchanged machine-gun fire with a Japanese Aichi E13A reconnaissance aircraft. The Vengeances proved unsuited to the maritime patrol tasks they were assigned while at Cooktown and Merauke.

=== Initial New Guinea operations ===
The commander of the Allied Air Forces in the South West Pacific, Lieutenant General George Kenney, requested in late August 1943 that the RAAF dispatch a squadron of dive bombers to New Guinea for use against pinpoint targets in the Huon Gulf area. No. 24 Squadron was selected for this role, and its 18 Vengeances were rushed to Tsili Tsili Airfield before crew training was complete. Little of the squadron's supporting equipment was dispatched as it was intended that the deployment would be temporary. After arriving at Tsili Tsili on 2 September, the squadron flew its first combat mission on the 7th of the month. This operation was frustrated by bad weather, and the aircraft almost ran out of fuel on their return flight due to difficulties in locating their airfield. An attack the next day was successful. On 18 September, No. 24 Squadron dispatched 14 aircraft as part of an attack on Japanese positions near Finschhafen in preparation for a landing by Australian Army forces. The squadron destroyed a Japanese radio station on the Tami Islands near Finschhafen area on 21 September. It provided support for Australian Army units involved in the Huon Peninsula campaign during late September and October. This included playing a significant role in halting a major Japanese counter-attack during early to mid October.

The lack of ground equipment complicated No. 24 Squadron's operations, especially as it took a long time for this material to arrive once a decision to retain the unit in New Guinea had been made. As a result of equipment shortages and inadequate aircrew training, the squadron was not fully ready for combat until December; this greatly frustrated Kenney's deputy, Brigadier General Ennis Whitehead, who commented that "we have never gotten a mission out of that unit". Some of the training deficiencies were due to the RAAF's practice of stationing operational training units in southern Australia, with the result that aircrew were unfamiliar with flying in tropical conditions. During December, the squadron operated against Japanese positions on New Britain and New Ireland ahead of the American landings in western New Britain.

=== Mobile strike force ===
In September 1943, Kenney asked the RAAF to provide a mobile strike force for offensive operations in New Guinea. The RAAF decided that the force should comprise a wing equipped with Vengeance aircraft and another wing of fighters to escort the dive bombers. No. 77 Wing was formed as the dive bomber unit in what was designated No. 10 (Operational) Group, and comprised Nos. 21, 23 and 24 Squadrons as well as service and medical units. The other major element of the group was No. 78 Wing, which included three fighter squadrons. It was originally intended for No. 10 Group to begin moving to New Guinea on 1 December 1943, but problems with planning the deployment and transport shortfalls meant that most of its elements did not depart Australia until mid-January 1944. No. 24 Squadron arrived at No. 77 Wing's intended base at Nadzab in New Guinea on 16 January 1944. No. 23 Squadron arrived at Nadzab on 9 February and No. 21 Squadron on the 18th of that month.

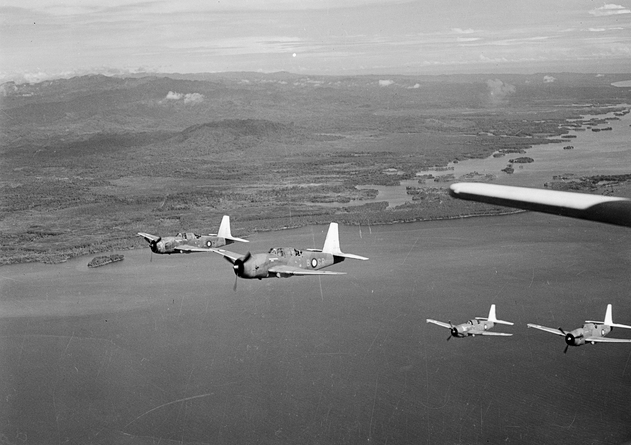
No. 24 Squadron Vengeances returning from a raid on 27 February 1944

No. 77 Wing's initial combat missions were conducted by No. 24 Squadron. From 17 to 23 January the unit supported Australian Army units involved in the Battle of Shaggy Ridge by conducting highly accurate dive-bombing strikes on Japanese positions. These attacks compensated for the Army units' lack of artillery, and assisted them to capture well-protected Japanese positions. The Vengeances were typically escorted by Curtiss P-40 Kittyhawk fighters from No. 78 Wing. No. 24 Squadron also attacked buildings on Gragat Island near Madang on 24 January as part of a raid involving two squadrons of North American B-25 Mitchell medium bombers. On 29 February the squadron bombed Japanese positions near the village of Orgoruna and strafed the settlement in support of Army units; during this operation two Vengeances experienced engine problems, one being destroyed in a crash landing. Two days later, No. 24 Squadron attacked and destroyed a bridge defended by anti-aircraft guns at the village of Bogadjim. Only three of the five aircraft dispatched were able to locate the target, and two were damaged by fragments from the bombs they dropped. Historian Mark Johnston has judged this operation to have been "perhaps the Vultees' most notable achievement" in Australian service. No. 24 Squadron was withdrawn from combat for two weeks on 31 January to undertake what official historian George Odgers described as "much-needed training exercises" for recently arrived replacement aircrew.

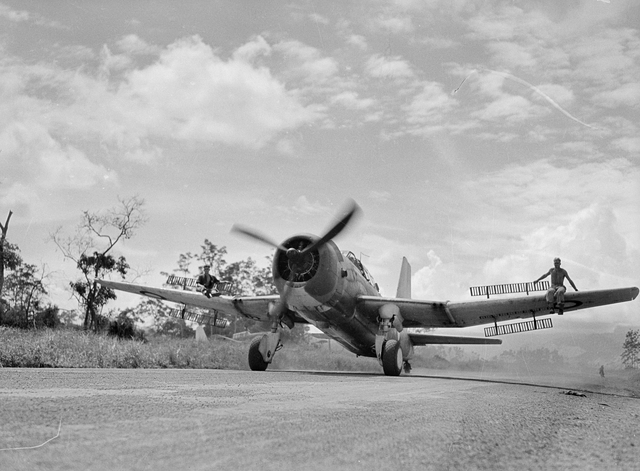
A No. 21 Squadron Vengeance taxiing after a raid in February 1944

The wing's operations expanded during February 1944. No. 23 Squadron entered combat on 11 February when six of its aircraft, operating in conjunction with six from No. 24 Squadron, bombed three villages south of Saidor in support of United States Army forces. The next day twelve aircraft from No. 23 Squadron and six from No. 24 Squadron made unsuccessful attacks against a road near Bogadjim after bad weather forced the cancellation of a close air support mission. For the remainder of the month, No. 78 Wing's main tasks were to attack the Japanese Army's 20th Division as it retreated from Allied forces and to strike Japanese airfields at Alexishafen and Madang. On 22 February, aircraft from all three of the wing's squadrons attacked camouflaged Japanese barge harbours near Madang; this was No. 21 Squadron's first combat operation. The next day ten Vengeances bombed Saidor. On 24 February, 23 Vengeances from Nos. 21 and 23 Squadrons struck Japanese anti-aircraft gun positions at Hansa Bay. Two aircraft from No. 23 Squadron were shot down with the loss of their crews. On 26, 27 and 28 February all three of the wing's squadrons attacked the airfields at Madang and Alexishafen to prevent Japanese forces from using them to attack the Allied forces which had landed on the Admiralty Islands. The first and second of these operations involved twelve aircraft from each squadron. A total of 33 Vengeances were dispatched for the operation on 28 February, when they and No. 78 Wing combined to form an attack force of 62 aircraft. Despite the size of these operations, No. 77 Wing's aircrew judged that the airfields were not being used by the Japanese as damage from earlier attacks went unrepaired.

No. 77 Wing conducted further combat operations during early March. On the second of the month, 24 Vengeances attacked Japanese positions on Karkar Island, encountering only light anti-aircraft gunfire. Over the next two days the wing targeted Japanese positions on the Rai coast in preparation for a US Army landing scheduled for 5 March. On 3 March, Nos. 23 and 24 Squadrons attacked Mindiri village and a nearby camp site. Aircraft from all three of the wing's squadrons attacked a camp at Pommern Bay on two occasions the next day. One Vengeance was damaged in a forced landing. The US Army unit's landing at Mindiri on 5 March did not encounter any opposition. On 8 March a force of 36 Vengeances from all three of No. 77 Wing's squadrons was dispatched to strike Rempi village near Alexishafen. Due to bad weather, No. 23 Squadron aborted its attack, and bombed a target to the north of the village. The other two squadrons successfully approached Rempi by making shallow dives through the clouds, and bombed the target area. Four Vengeances were lightly damaged by anti-aircraft fire.

== Withdrawal from combat ==
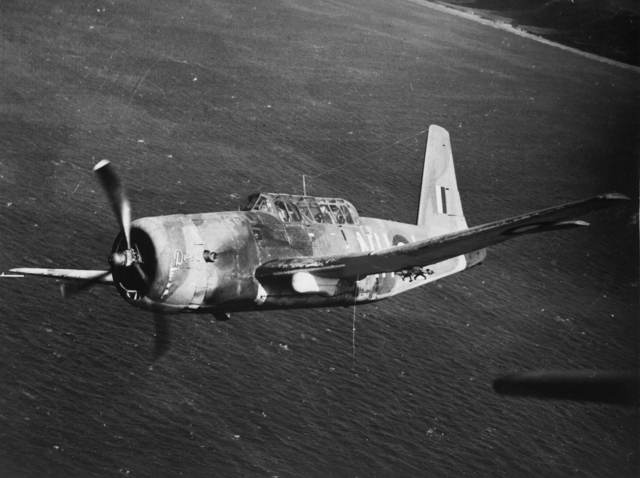
A Vengeance patrolling over the ocean

The attack on Rempi was the final combat operation involving Australian Vengeances. On 8 March 1944, General Douglas MacArthur's General Headquarters, which commanded all Allied forces in the South West Pacific Area, directed No. 77 Wing's squadrons to return to Australia and No. 78 Wing to move to the Cape Gloucester area of New Britain. This decision, which had been endorsed by RAAF Command, took No. 10 Group's headquarters and personnel by surprise and led to the cancellation of a raid on Rempi planned for that day. To keep No. 10 Group up to strength, three light bomber squadrons were transferred from No. 9 Group to No. 77 Wing. During a subsequent discussion between Kenney and Air Vice-Marshal George Jones, the Chief of the Air Force, the American general stated that he did not intend to use the Vengeance in combat again. Jones immediately directed the RAAF's representative in Washington DC to cancel the order for 58 Vengeances that had not yet been delivered to Australia.

Several factors explain the withdrawal of the RAAF's Vengeances from combat. Odgers judged that a key reason behind the decision was the poor performance of the Vengeance compared to other available aircraft in the region. USAAF units equipped with superior types were arriving in New Guinea during early 1944, and Kenney wanted to free up scarce space at forward airfields so that he could launch attacks on the important Japanese bases at Wewak and Hollandia; these targets were beyond the range of the Vengeance. In particular, No. 77 Wing was required to vacate Nadzab so that its airfields could accommodate a group of long-ranged Lockheed P-38 Lightning fighters. Odgers also argued that the Vengeances had proven to be mechanically unreliable, and had difficulty taking off while carrying a full bomb load: in practice it was found that they could carry only the same bomb load as Kittyhawk fighters. The Kittyhawks were also superior at strafing targets and did not need to be escorted. A 2008 paper written by staff of the RAAF's Air Power Development Centre disputed Odgers' views on the reliability of the aircraft, stating that No. 77 Wing had a good serviceability rate. This paper instead argued that difficulties in supplying the wing may have been a more important factor.

No. 77 Wing's three dive bomber squadrons returned to Australia during March 1944 to be re-equipped with Consolidated B-24 Liberator heavy bombers. The RAAF had previously intended to establish new squadrons to introduce the Liberator into service, and the availability of the Vengeance-equipped units simplified this process. All of the squadrons' dive bombers departed Nadzab on 13 March, and their ground crews followed soon afterwards. No. 21 Squadron was transferred to Camden, New South Wales, No. 23 Squadron to Higgins Field in Cape York where it operated as an army-cooperation unit as part of No. 75 Wing, and No. 24 Squadron to Lowood. All three units ceased flying Vengeances shortly afterwards. No. 4 OTU was also disbanded on 30 April 1944. No. 12 Squadron remained at Merauke until July 1944, when it was withdrawn to Strathpine, Queensland, and handed in its Vengeances ahead of also receiving Liberators.

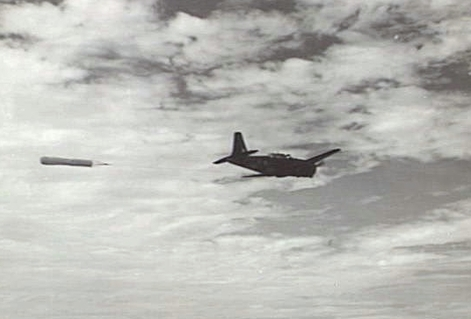
A Vengeance being used as a target tug during an exercise in July 1944

No. 25 Squadron was the final RAAF combat unit to operate Vengeances, which it used to conduct anti-submarine patrols and army-cooperation tasks from Pearce. During the Western Australian emergency of March 1944, the squadron was held at readiness to launch dive-bombing attacks on the Japanese ships that were feared to be approaching the Perth region. This provided to be a false alarm, and the unit soon resumed its normal duties. In January 1945, No. 25 Squadron began converting to the Liberator.

The RAAF used Vengeance aircraft for a variety of tasks following their withdrawal from combat roles. The type was operated by Nos. 3, 4, 5, 6, 7 and 8 Communication Units, which were responsible for light transport and training tasks. No. 1 Air Performance Unit employed Vengeances as target tugs and for trials purposes. No. 7 Operational Training Unit, which was responsible for converting aircrew to Liberator bombers, was issued with Vengeance target tugs. Vengeances were also used in trials of poison gas conducted by the 1st Australian Field Experimental Station, Royal Australian Engineers, near Proserpine, Queensland, during 1944. In May 1944, Vengeances from No. 21 Squadron were used to impersonate German Junkers Ju 87 dive bombers during the production of the movie The Rats of Tobruk. For this task the aircraft were painted with Luftwaffe markings.

The type was withdrawn from service in 1946; as of June that year the RAAF had 235 Vengeances on hand, but only required two. The aircraft were disposed of over the next six years, most being sold for scrap. Twelve Vengeance airframes were transferred to the Royal Australian Navy between 1948 and 1951 to be used for ground handling and fire-fighting training.

== Assessment ==
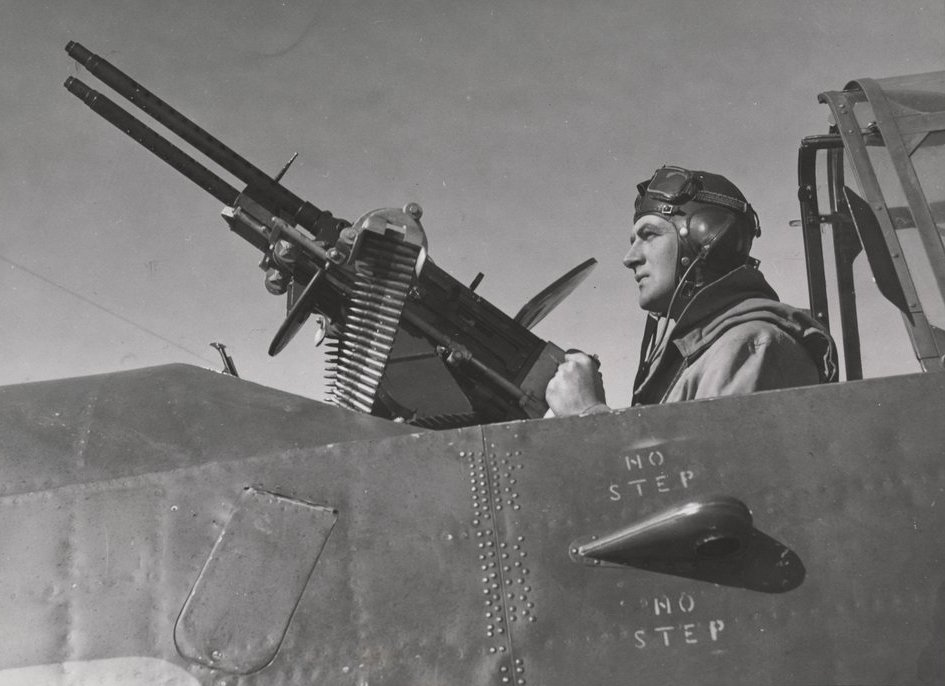
An airman holding the twin machine guns mounted at the rear of a RAAF Vengeance's cockpit

The RAAF's acquisition and use of the Vultee Vengeance remains controversial. The Air Power Development Centre judged that the type's service was not "conspicuously good or bad", and Stewart Wilson described it as having a "somewhat indifferent career". Historian Peter C. Smith has argued that the decision to withdraw the Vengeances from combat was mistaken, as the Royal New Zealand Air Force and United States Marine Corps successfully used dive bombers for close air support tasks in the South West Pacific until the end of the war and the RAAF could have built on No. 77 Wing's "great but limited achievement". Similarly, Michael Nelmes has written that No. 77 Wing's dive-bombing operations were successful. In contrast, American historian Eric Bergerud has written that by selling Australia Vengeances, the US Government "unloaded junk". In his memoirs, Jones described the type as "a hopeless failure". Australian historian Chris Clark has noted that one of the reasons the RAAF was excluded from major campaigns during the last years of the Pacific War was that many of its units were equipped with inferior aircraft such as the Vengeance.

The Australian Government and RAAF were embarrassed by the rapid withdrawal from service of aircraft that had been acquired at considerable cost. However, their crews generally acknowledged the Vengeance's shortcomings and accepted the decision. Evatt also came to regret the deal he struck which led to the acquisition of the Vengeance, and jokingly told Jones at a War Cabinet meeting to not "mention the bloody Vultees or I'll break your wrist". The Air Power Development Centre's analysis of the Vengeance's RAAF career concluded that the type had been unsuited to the service's requirements, and "demonstrates the need to align force structure, doctrine and equipment".

== Surviving aircraft ==
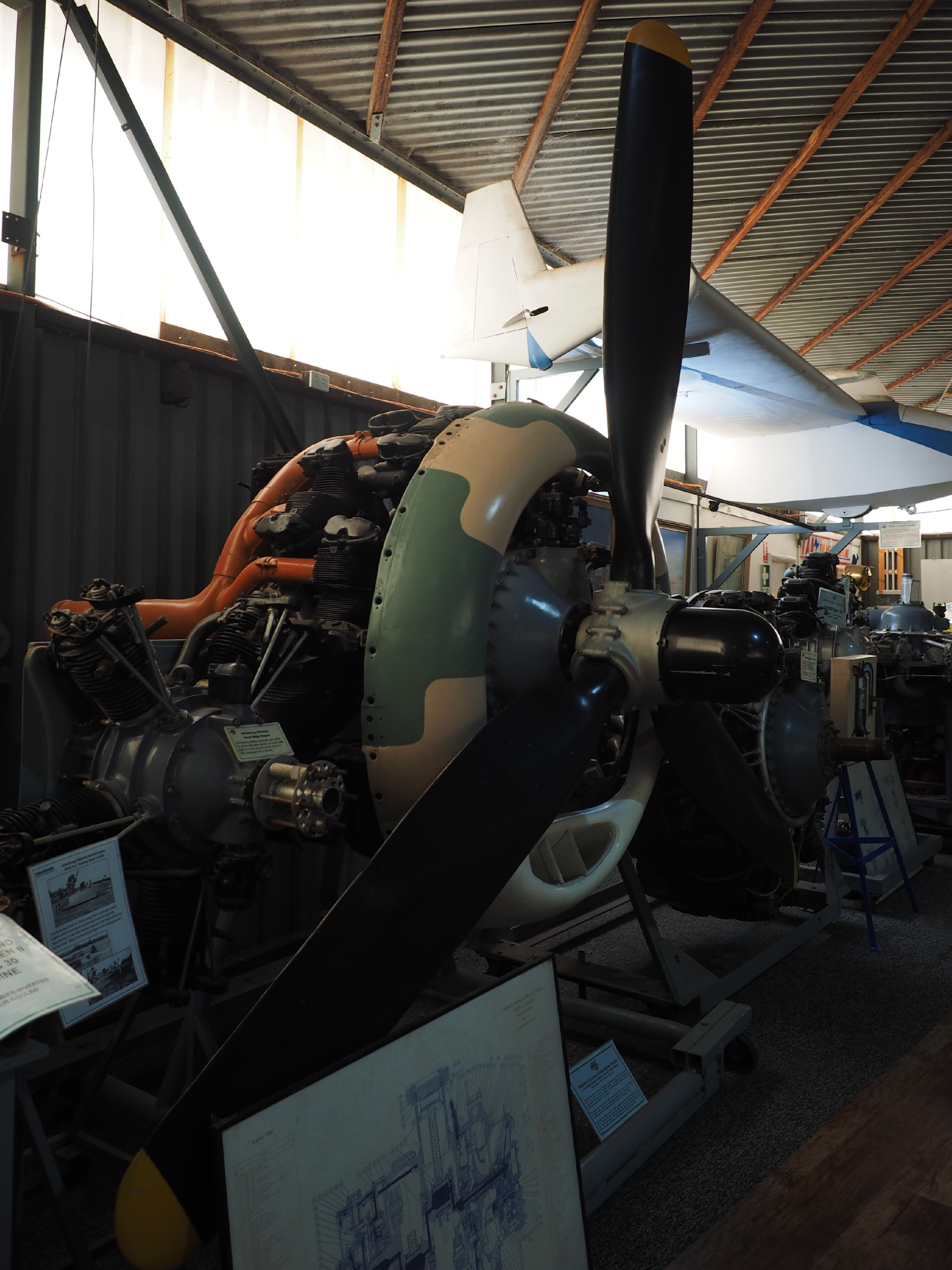
A Wright R-2600 engine that had been fitted to a RAAF Vengeance on display at the Aviation Heritage Museum in 2025

Only a single complete RAAF Vengeance, the former A27-99, was preserved. As of 2021, this aircraft was held by the Camden Museum of Aviation in the outskirts of Sydney and was the only remaining complete Vengeance worldwide. This museum has not been open to the public since 2008.

Most parts of the airframe of the former A27-247 were also held by the Aviation Heritage Museum in Perth as at 1986.
