= Brewster SB2A Buccaneer =

Allied WWII monoplane scout/bomber aircraft

SB2A Buccaneer
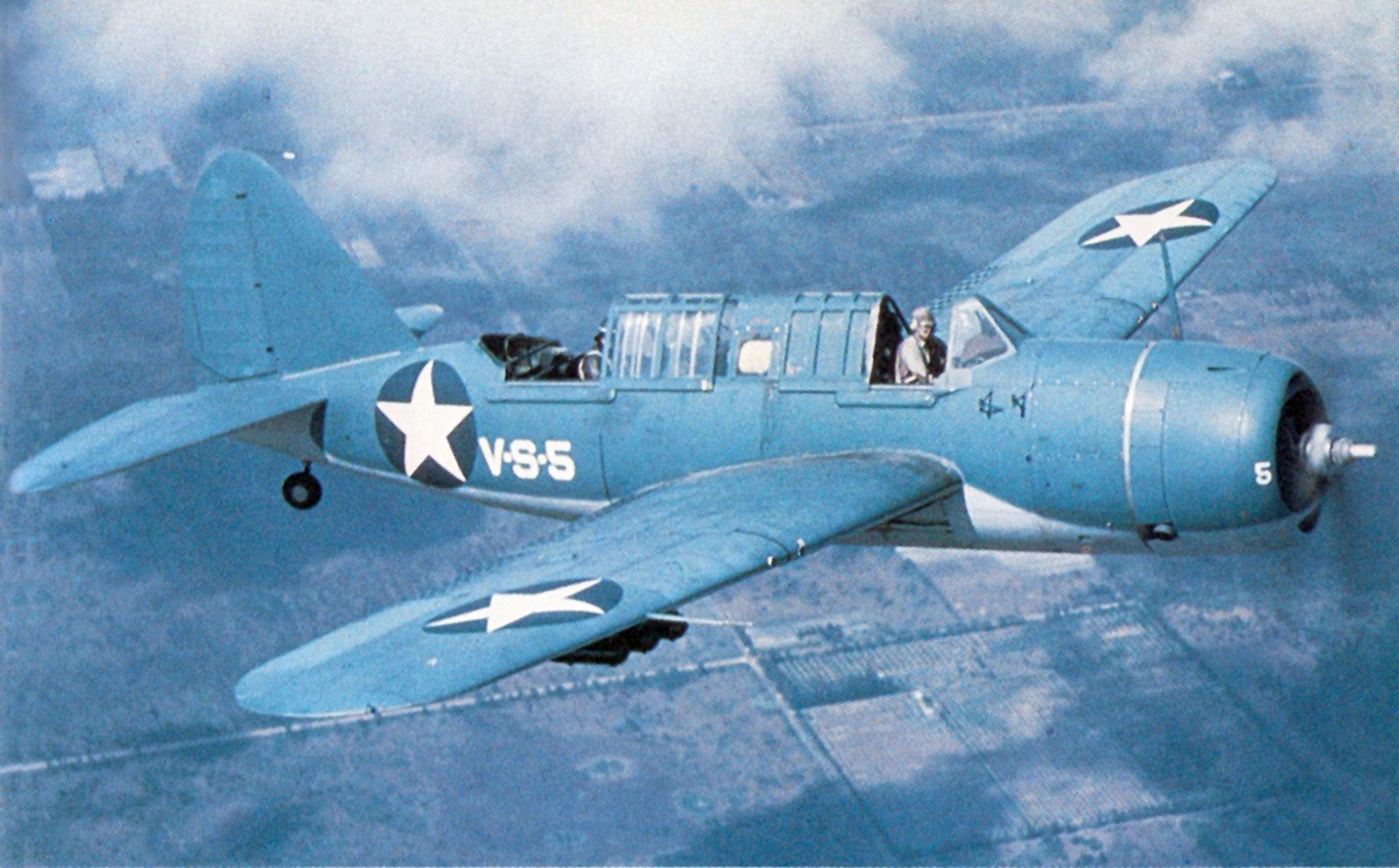
- An SB2A-4 near NAS Vero Beach, Florida, 1942–43

General information
- Type: Scout bomber
- National origin: United States
- Manufacturer: Brewster Aeronautical Corporation
- Status: Retired
- Primary users: United States Navy United States Army Air Corps; Royal Air Force; Royal Navy
- Number built: 771

History
- First flight: 17 June 1941

The Brewster SB2A Buccaneer (Brewster Model 340), also known as the Brewster Bermuda, is a single-engined mid-wing monoplane scout bomber aircraft built by the Brewster Aeronautical Corporation for the United States Navy between 1942 and 1944. It was also supplied to the Royal Air Force (RAF), United States Army Air Forces, and United States Marine Corps. The SB2A was overweight and lacked maneuverability, and has been described as a "classic failure". Although designed as a scout bomber, it never saw combat, but did find use in noncombat roles.

The SB2A was developed for the US Navy, and also ordered in large quantities by the Dutch, French, and British Governments. The Dutch order was later taken over by the US Navy and the French order by Britain. An Australian order was cancelled before any of the types were delivered. The Buccaneer was underpowered and poorly constructed, and all of its operators considered it to be unsuitable for combat. SB2As were used as target tugs by the RAF and US Navy, trainers by the United States Marine Corps Aviation (USMC) and "hacks" by the USAAF. Many of the completed aircraft were scrapped without entering service. The type is considered by historians to have been among the worst of World War II. The Brewster Corporation itself went out of business in 1946.

== Design and development ==
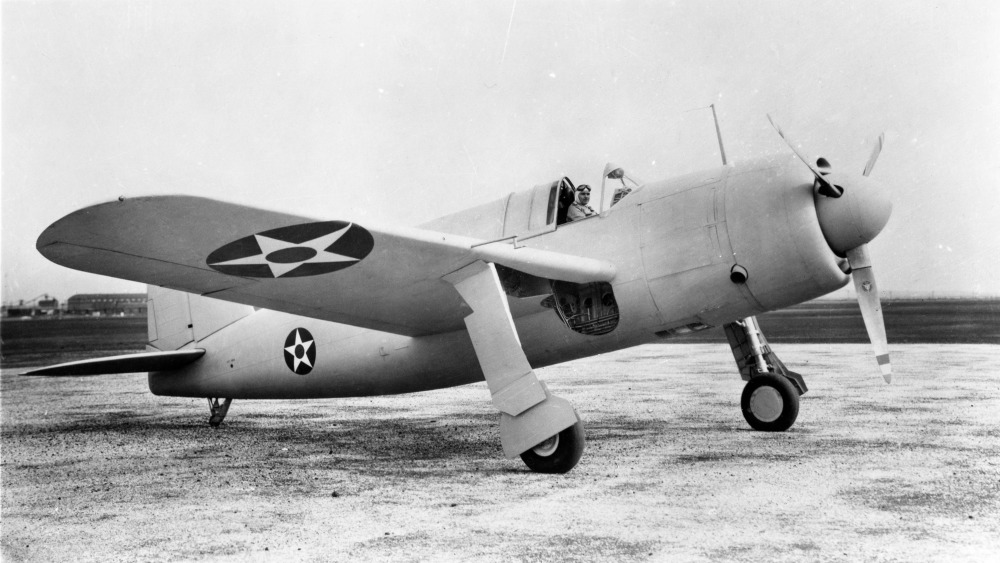
The XSB2A-1 prototype

In early 1939 the United States Navy's Bureau of Aeronautics launched a program to develop larger scout/bombers to operate from the Navy's aircraft carriers. In April that year the Brewster Aeronautical Corporation was selected to build a prototype of its Model 340 design to meet this requirement; this aircraft was to be designated the XSB2A-1. The Navy had ordered a prototype of the Model 340/SB2A in April 1939.

The XSB2A-1's design was based on the earlier Brewster SBA scout-bomber. It shared the single-engined, mid-winged monoplane layout of the earlier aircraft, but was larger and had a more powerful engine. The XSB2A-1 was powered by a single Wright R-2600 engine which drove a three-bladed propeller. It was armed with two forward-firing 0.50-inch calibre machine guns in the fuselage and two 0.30 machine guns in each wing. The type was initially intended to have an enclosed gun turret and could carry up to 1,000 pounds (450 kg) of bombs in an internal bomb bay.

The first XSB2A-1 prototype commenced flying trials on 17 June 1941. The results of this testing and changing requirements led to significant changes to the design. These included the airframe being lengthened by 1 foot and two inches, the turret being replaced by a flexible mount in the rear of the cockpit for a pair of 0.30 machine guns, the addition of armour and self-sealing fuel tanks, and changes to the design of the fins and canopy. The combined effect of these changes resulted in the aircraft's weight increasing by almost 3,000 pounds (1,400 kg), which greatly reduced its speed, weapons load, and flying range.

In its final form, the SB2A weighed 9,924 pounds (4,501 kg) empty and had a maximum take-off weight of 14,289 pounds (6,481 kg). It had a maximum speed of 274 miles per hour (441 km/h), a cruising speed of 161 miles per hour (259 km/h), and a maximum range of 1,675 miles (2,696 km). The airframe was not well designed, and could be easily damaged. The SB2A was manned by a crew of two: a pilot and airman who served as both an observer and a gunner.

=== Production ===
The French Government placed an order for 250 SB2As. Following the fall of France this order was taken over by the British Government, which ordered another 500 during 1940; in British service the type was called the Brewster Bermuda. The Dutch Government also ordered 162 SB2As before the German conquest of the country in May 1940. The Australian Government ordered 243 Bermudas for the Royal Australian Air Force in mid-1940. In December 1940 the US Navy placed an order for 140 SB2As.

Deliveries of the SB2A were greatly delayed. When the French Government placed its order it expected to begin receiving the type from April 1941, after Brewster completed the production of its Brewster F2A Buffalo fighters. Brewster experienced difficulties in completing the Buffalos and commencing work on the SB2A. After the British Government requested substantial modifications to the SB2A in early 1941, Brewster formally advised that it would be unable to start deliveries of the type as had been planned earlier. These delays led the Australian Government to cancel its order of Bermudas in October 1941 in favour of purchasing 297 Vultee Vengeances. Following the attack on Pearl Harbor, the US Government appropriated 192 of the aircraft which had been ordered by the British in January 1942; these aircraft were to be operated by the United States Army Air Forces (USAAF).

Serious problems within Brewster also contributed to delays. The company was badly run, and its workforce was poorly trained and frequently took strike action. After Brewster missed deadlines to deliver aircraft to the US Navy, it was taken over by the Navy in April 1942. Production continued to be slow and many of the completed SB2As suffered from defects.

== Operational history ==
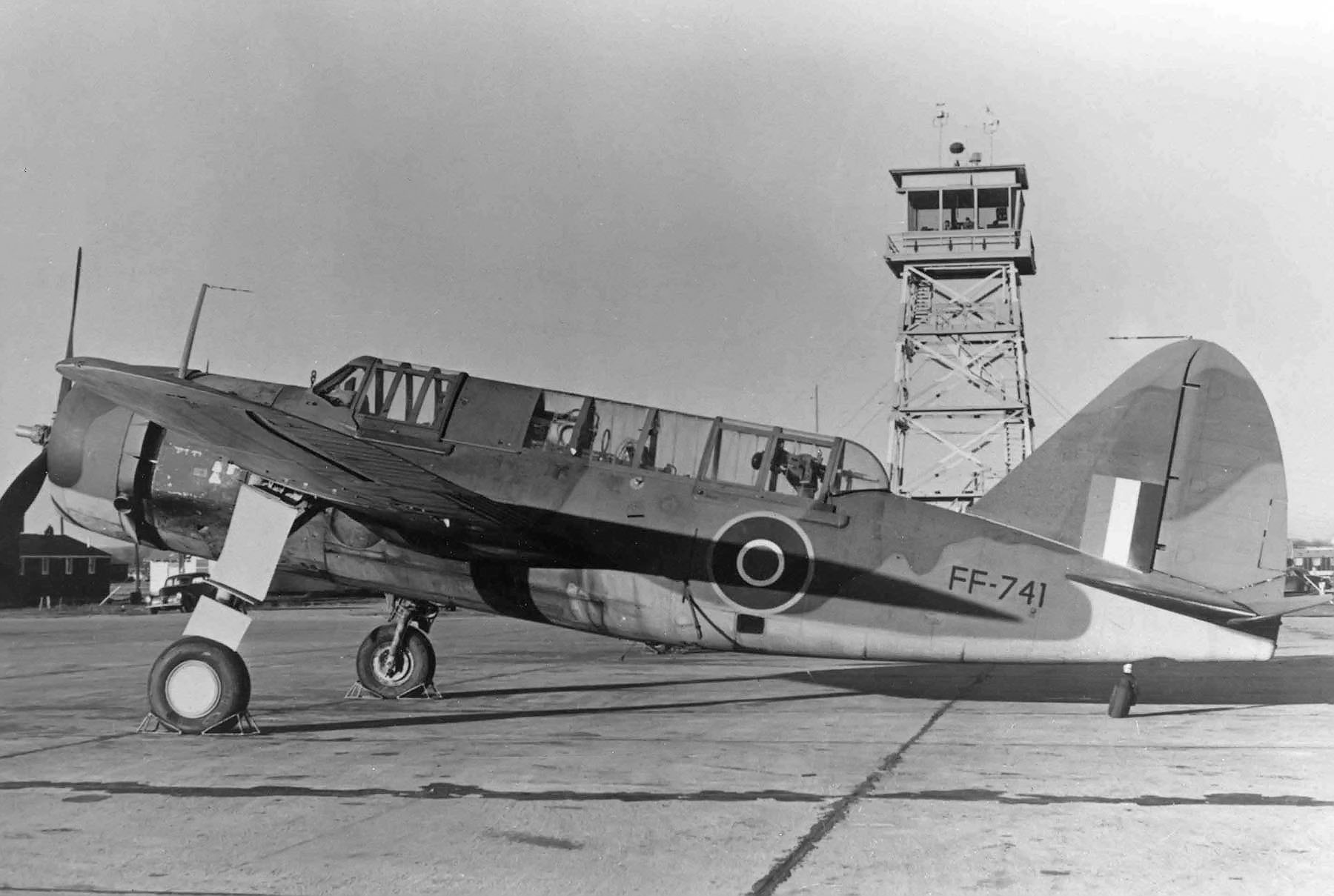
Royal Air Force Bermuda I

Deliveries of Brewster Bermudas to the Royal Air Force commenced in July 1942. The RAF judged that the type was unsuitable for combat, and most of the Bermudas delivered to the service were converted to target tugs. Five of the aircraft were transferred to the Fleet Air Arm for assessment – four as dive bombers and one as a target tug.

The USAAF received 108 Bermudas, which it called the A-34. The type was considered unsuitable even for training purposes and was used only as "hacks". As the aircraft broke down they were either abandoned or used as targets for artillery training. The A-34s were withdrawn from service in 1944.

Deliveries to the US Navy took place during 1943 and 1944. The service received 80 SB2A-2s and 60 SB2A-3s; the latter variant was fitted with folding wings and an arrester hook to enable them to operate from aircraft carriers. The US Navy also regarded the SB2A as unsuitable for combat and training purposes, and mainly used its aircraft as target tugs and for ground maintenance training.

The Netherlands ordered 162 examples meant to serve in the KNIL; however, the Dutch East Indies were overrun by the Japanese before any could be delivered. These aircraft were instead assigned by the US Navy to the United States Marine Corps, and delivered with Dutch markings in the cockpits. As the SB2A-4, the Marines used some of these aircraft to establish their first night fighter squadron VMF(N)-531.

Due to the poor performance of the SB2A, many of the completed aircraft were scrapped by the RAF and US Navy without having been flown operationally. The US Navy cancelled its remaining order of the type in 1943. A total of 771 SB2As were eventually completed. The Truman Committee stated that the SB2A "turned in a miserable performance."

Historians regard the SB2A as a failure. David Donald has labelled it "one of the worst aircraft of World War II". Similarly, the Pima Air & Space Museum website states that the type was "perhaps the least successful Allied aircraft of World War II". The National Naval Aviation Museum website also notes that "overweight, underpowered, and lacking maneuverability, the Brewster SB2A Buccaneer was a classic failure".

== Variants ==
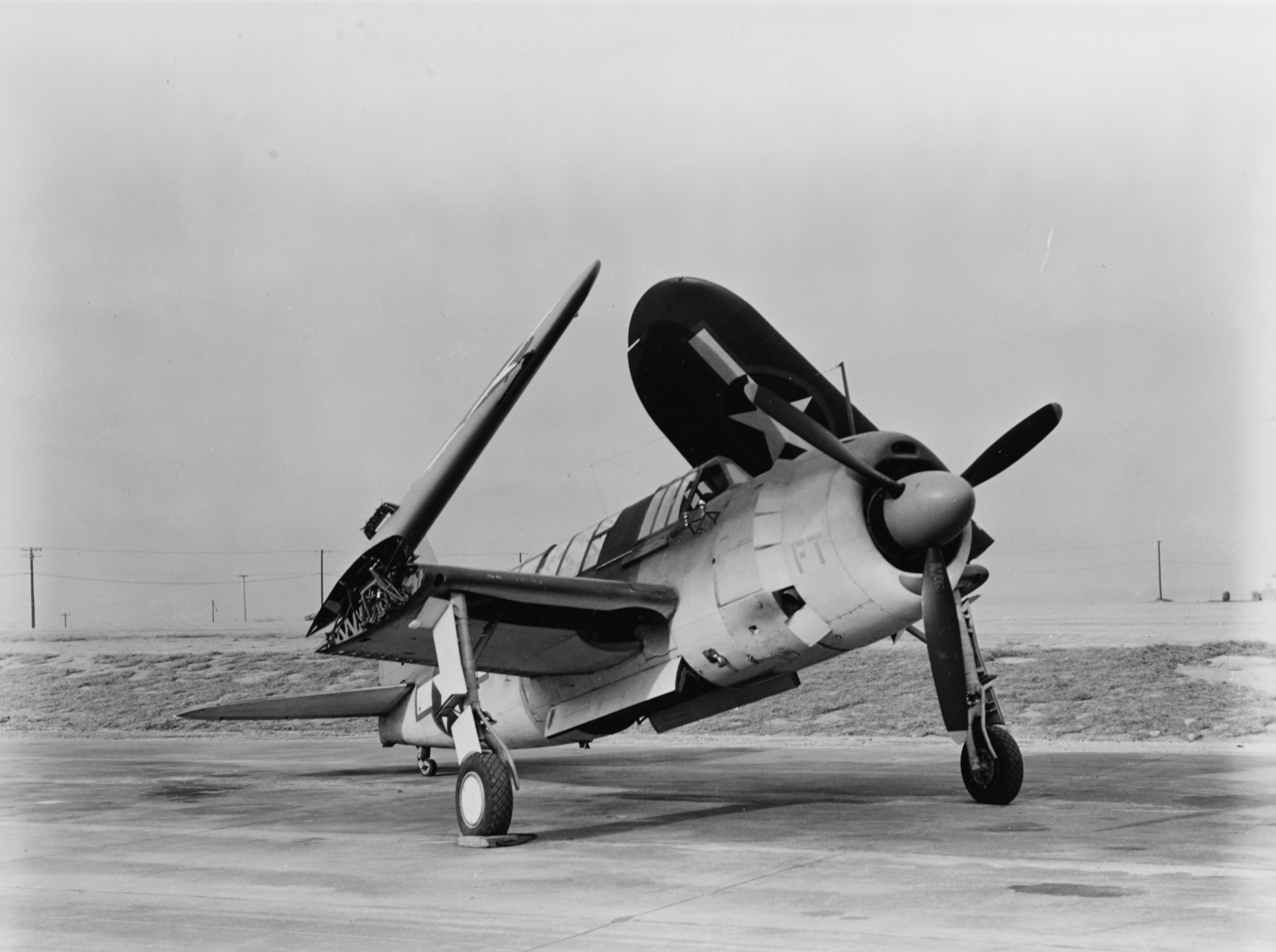
A SB2A-3 with its wings folded and bomb bay open

XSB2A-1 Buccaneer
Prototype, one built (Bu1632, 01005).
SB2A-2
Initial production, revised armament – non-folding wings. 80 built (Bu00803/00882).
SB2A-3
Fitted with folding wings and arrestor hook for carrier operations. 60 built (Bu00883/00942).
SB2A-4
Aircraft built for Netherlands and requisitioned for the US Navy. 162 built (Bu29214/29375).
A-34 Bermuda
Designation for Lend Lease production for United Kingdom
Bermuda Mk.1
Model 340-14 production for United Kingdom. Powered gun mounting replaced by flexible gun mounting. Only 468 of 750 ordered were delivered.

== Operators ==
United Kingdom

- Royal Air Force
- Fleet Air Arm

United States

- United States Army Air Corps
- United States Navy
- United States Marine Corps

== Surviving aircraft ==
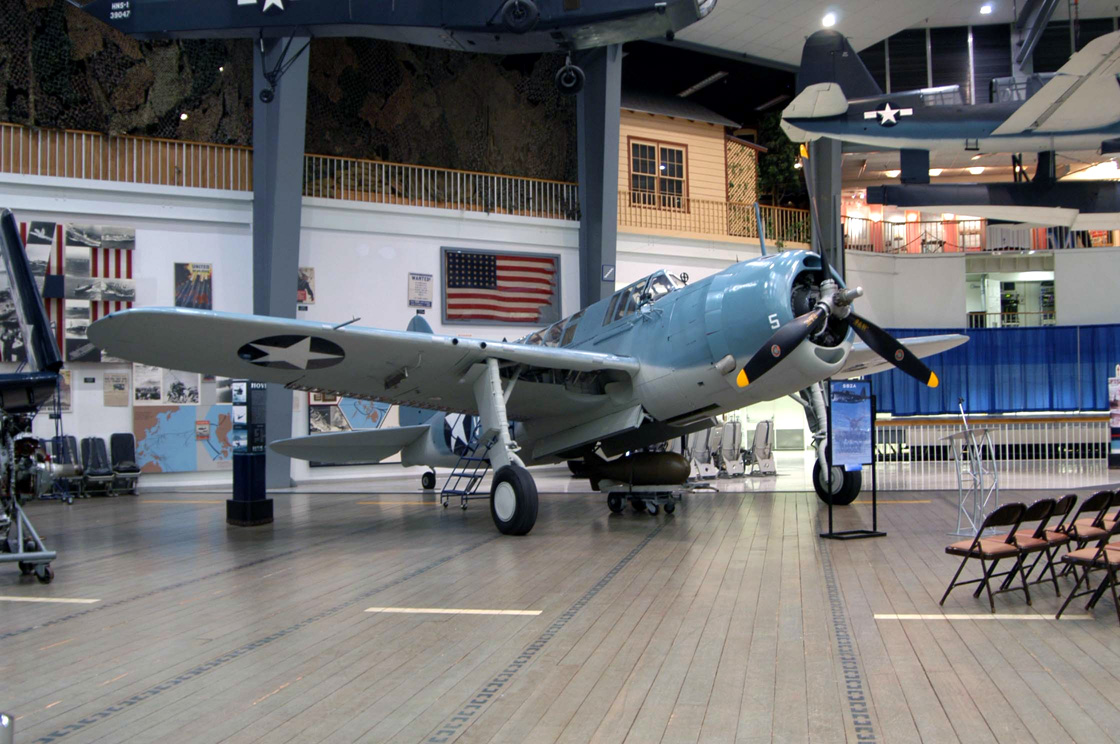
The SB2A of the National Museum of Naval Aviation

- RAF s/n FF860 – National Museum of Naval Aviation at Naval Air Station Pensacola, Florida. It is displayed as a US Navy SB2A Buccaneer.
- s/n unknown – in storage at the Pima Air and Space Museum in Tucson, Arizona.

== Specifications (SB2A-4) ==

Data from American Warplanes of World War II

General characteristics

- Crew: two: pilot and observer/gunner
- Length: 39 ft 2 in (11.94 m)
- Wingspan: 47 ft 0 in (14.33 m)
- Height: 15 ft 5 in (4.70 m)
- Wing area: 379 sq ft (35.2 m^{2})
- Empty weight: 9,924 lb (4,501 kg)
- Gross weight: 12,239 lb (5,552 kg)
- Max takeoff weight: 14,289 lb (6,481 kg)
- Powerplant: 1 × Wright R-2600-8 radial engine, 1,700 hp (1,268 kW)

Performance

- Maximum speed: 274 mph (441 km/h, 238 kn)
- Range: 1,675 mi (2,696 km, 1,455 nmi)
- Service ceiling: 24,900 ft (7,590 m)

Armament

- Guns: ** 2 × .50 in (12.7 mm) M2 Browning machine guns in fuselage
  - 2 × .30 in (7.62 mm) M1919 Browning machine guns in wings
  - 2 × .30 in (7.62 mm) machine guns in flexible rear mount
- Bombs: 1,000 lb (450 kg) in internal bomb bay

== See also ==
Aircraft of comparable role, configuration, and era

- Curtiss SB2C Helldiver

Related lists

- List of aircraft of World War II
- List of military aircraft of the United States
- List of United States Navy aircraft designations (pre-1962)
