= Vultee A-31 Vengeance =

1941 attack aircraft family by Vultee

A-31/A-35 Vengeance
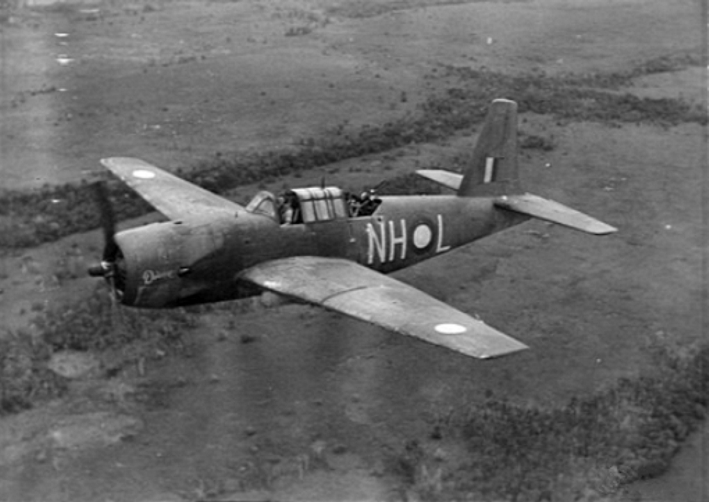
- A Royal Australian Air Force Vengeance in 1943

General information
- Type: Dive bomber
- National origin: United States
- Manufacturer: Vultee Aircraft
- Primary users: United States Army Air Forces Royal Air Force; Royal Australian Air Force; Royal Indian Air Force
- Number built: 1,931

History
- First flight: 30 March 1941
- Retired: April 1948

The Vultee A-31 Vengeance is an American dive bomber of World War II that was built by Vultee Aircraft. A modified version was called A-35. The Vengeance was not used operationally by the United States but was operated as a front-line aircraft by the Royal Air Force, the Royal Australian Air Force, and the Royal Indian Air Force in Southeast Asia and the Southwest Pacific. The A-31 remained in service with US units until 1945, primarily as a target-tug.

== Design and development ==
In 1940, Vultee Aircraft started the design of a single-engined dive-bomber, the Vultee Model 72 (V-72) to meet the requirements of the French Armée de l'Air. The V-72 was built with private funds and was intended for sale to foreign markets. The V-72 was a low-wing, single-engine monoplane with a closed cockpit and a crew of two. An air-cooled radial Wright Twin Cyclone engine rated at 1,600 hp (1,200 kW) powered the V-72. It was armed with fixed forward-firing and flexible-mounted .30 in (7.62 mm) machine guns in the rear cockpit. The aircraft carried up to 1,500 lb (680 kg) of bombs in an interior bomb bay and on external wing racks.

The Vengeance was uniquely designed to dive vertically without lift from the wing pulling the aircraft off target. To this end, the wing had a 0° angle of incidence the better to align the nose of the aircraft with the target during the dive. This resulted in the aircraft cruising in a nose-up attitude, giving a poor forward view for the pilot, particularly during landing. It had an unusual, W-shaped wing planform. This resulted from an error in calculating its centre of gravity. Moving the wing back by "sweeping" the centre section was a simpler fix than re-designing the wing root. This gives the impression of an inverted gull wing when seen from an angle, when in fact the wing has a more conventional dihedral on the outer wing panels.

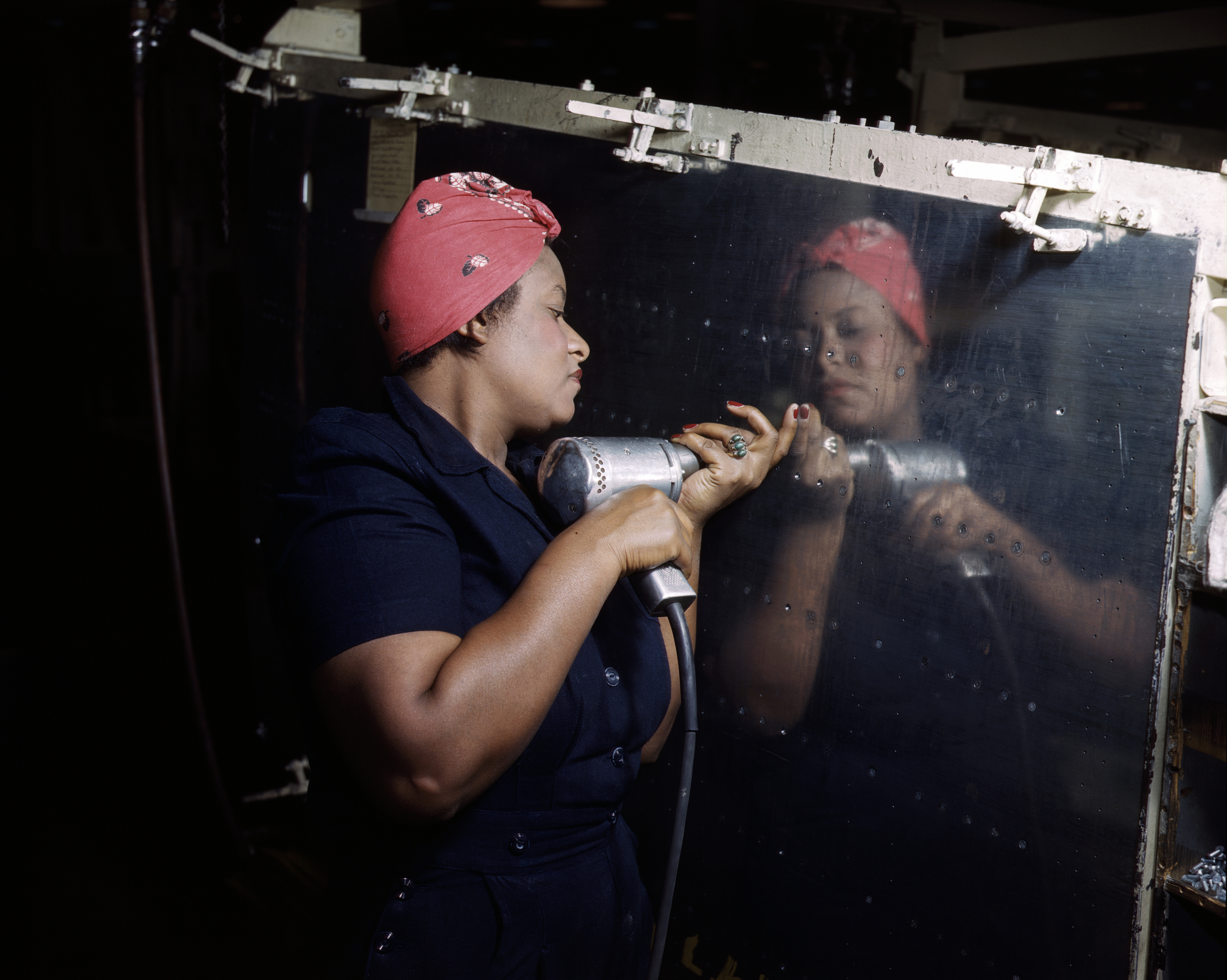
A riveter on the Vengeance bomber at the Vultee plant in Nashville, Tennessee (1943)

France placed an order for 300 V-72s, with deliveries intended to start in October 1940. The Battle of France in June 1940 stopped these plans, but at the same time the British Purchasing Commission, impressed by the performance of the German Junkers Ju 87, "Stuka" was shopping for a dive bomber for the Royal Air Force, and as it was the only aircraft available, placed an order for 200 V-72s (named Vengeance by Vultee) on 3 July 1940, with orders for a further 100 being placed in December. As Vultee's factory at Downey was already busy building BT-13 Valiant trainers, the aircraft were to be built at the Stinson factory at Nashville and under licence by Northrop at Hawthorne, California. (Note: Stinson was by this time owned by Vultee, and the factory was transferred to Vultee.)

The first prototype V-72 flew from Vultee's factory at Downey, California, on 30 March 1941. Additional aircraft were ordered for Britain in June 1941 under the Lend-Lease scheme, with those given the US Army Air Corps name A-31. After the US entered the war following the attack on Pearl Harbor, a number of V-72 and A-31 aircraft were repossessed for use by the USAAF. As the USAAF became interested in dive bombing, it decided to order production of an improved version of the Vengeance, the A-35, for both its own use and for supply to its allies under Lend-Lease. It was fitted with a more powerful Wright Twin Cyclone R-2600-19 engine and improved armament. As US Army test pilots disliked the poor pilot view resulting from the zero-incidence wing, that was "corrected" in the A-35, giving the plane a better attitude in cruise but lessening its accuracy as a dive bomber.

When production of the Vengeance was completed in 1944, a total of 1,931 aircraft had been made. The majority were produced at the Vultee plant in Nashville, Tennessee. Indecision about which aircraft type should replace it in production at the Vultee plant led to several "make-work" contracts for Vengeance aircraft to prevent dispersion of the skilled workforce. That resulted in the overproduction of what was considered an obsolete aircraft.

=== Evaluation ===
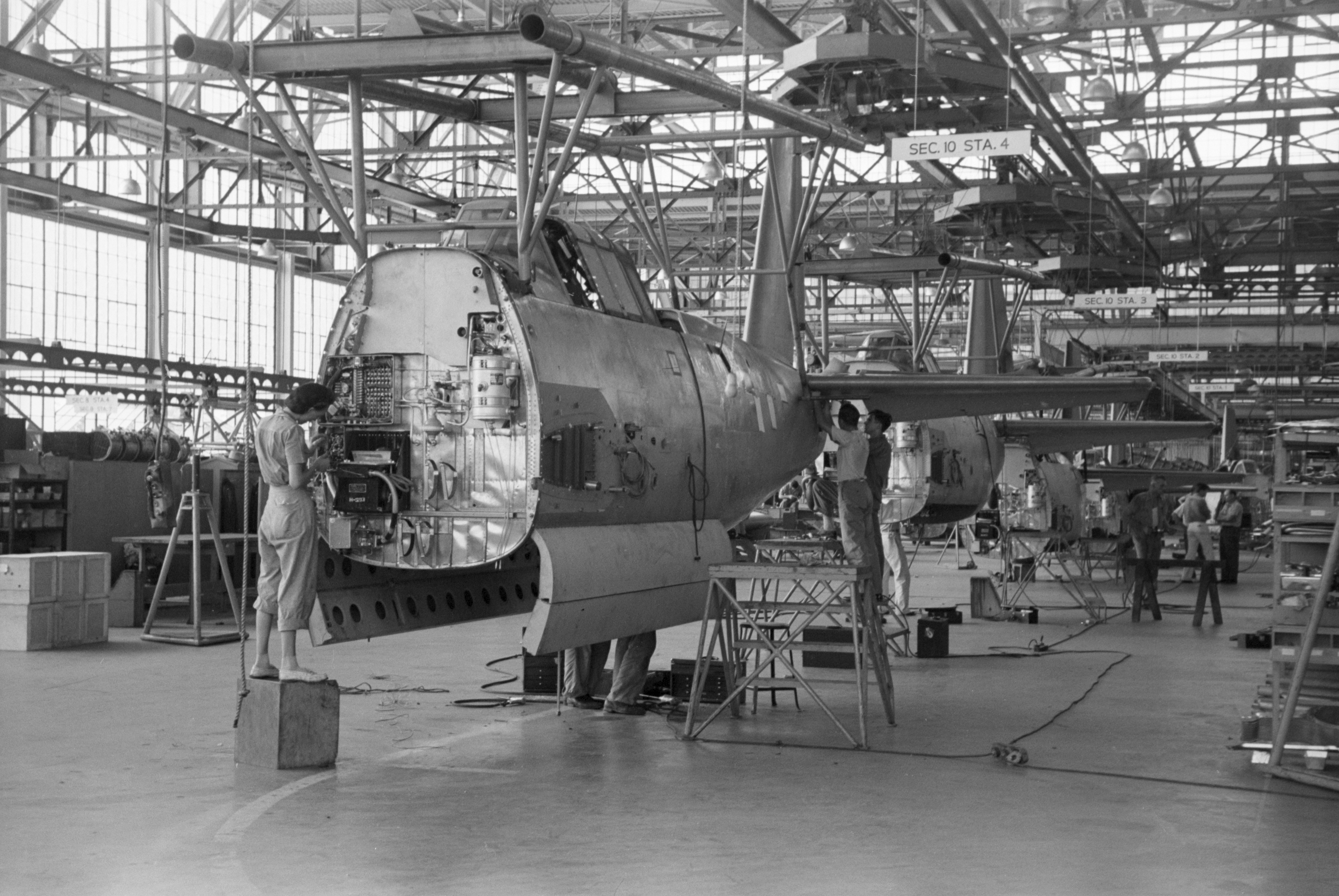
Vultee assembly line in August, 1942

Operational experience with other dive-bombers, such as the Blackburn Skua, Junkers Ju 87 Stuka, Aichi D3A "Val", Douglas Dauntless, Breda Ba.65 and Curtiss SB2C Helldiver, indicated that the Vengeance would be vulnerable to fighter attack. To be effective, all those aircraft required an environment of local air superiority and fighter escort. Escorts and lack of fighter opposition in the theatres in which it served, combined with its vertical dive capability, meant that the Vengeance suffered only light combat losses.

Early experience with the aircraft showed that there were problems with engine cooling. The RAF managed to solve the problems but Free French aircraft that did not have these problems remedied were grounded, being declared uneconomical and unreliable to operate. The aircraft was described as being stable in flight and in a dive, with heavy elevator and rudder control, the aileron control was considered light. Forward visibility was considered poor due to the large radial engine. There were a number of fatal accidents with the Vengeance due to improper dive procedures, as well as a center of gravity problem when the aircraft was flown with the rear cockpit canopy open and without a rear gunner.

The type was considered rugged, reliable, stable and generally well-behaved. Commonwealth forces operated the type from May 1942 to July 1944. Burma tended to have low importance for Allied air planners and forces in that theatre got left overs. Aircraft such as the Wellington and Hurricane spent their last days in Burma. The Vengeance saw considerable action attacking Japanese supply, communications and troop concentrations. Its service in that theatre has been described as "...very effective".

Peter Smith, author of Jungle Dive Bombers at War, wrote that, "Their pilots had difficulty in getting them off the ground with a full load. At Newton Field they were using the full length of the 6,000 ft (1,800 m) runway before becoming airborne. Kittyhawk aircraft could carry the same bomb load and in addition carry out ground-strafing".

In contrast, many crew spoke well of the Vengeance,

I certainly didn't have that experience of the Vultee. I can recall no incidents of pilots having difficulty in taking off with full bomb loads, and the Kittyhawk could not carry the same bomb load even after their undercarriage had been strengthened. I remember the Vultee as a lovely aircraft to fly, an aircraft that was hard to stall and was fully aerobatic. You could do anything in them, rolls, loops, stall turns, and there was enough room in the cockpit to hold a ball. I used to like flying them, although a lot of blokes thought that they were too cumbersome.

== Operational history ==
=== UK and India ===
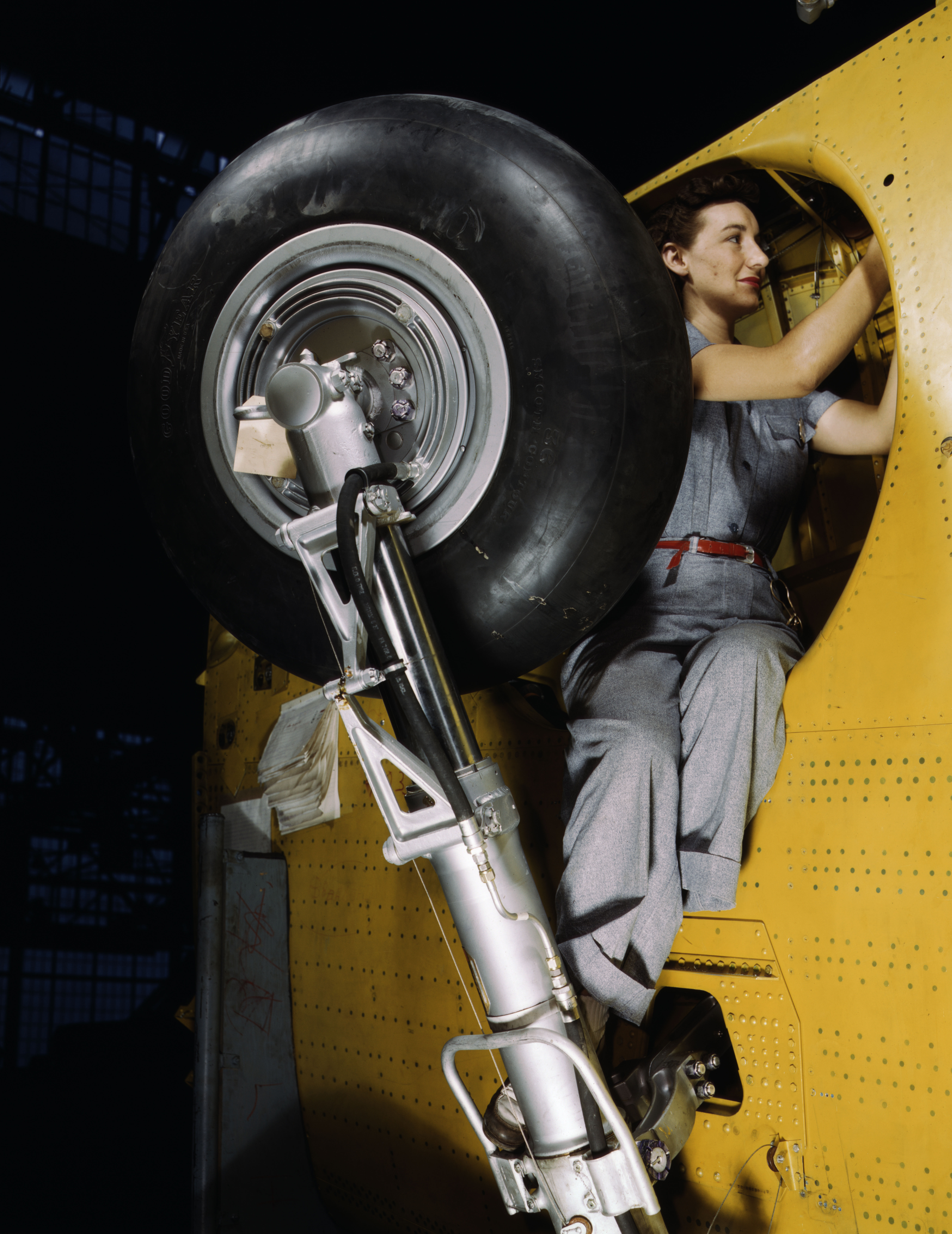
Worker at Vultee-Nashville makes final adjustments in the wheel well of an inner wing before the installation of the landing gear. (February 1942)

By the time that Britain had received many Vengeances, its opinion on the usefulness of specialised dive bombers had changed. As the Battle of Britain and operations over North Africa had shown the dive bomber to be vulnerable to fighter attack, the Vengeance was rejected for use over Western Europe or in the Mediterranean. It was decided to use the Vengeance in the Burma theatre to carry out dive-bombing operations in close support of British and Indian troops. RAF 82 Squadron and 110 Squadron received Vengeances in October 1942. The first dive bombing sorties against Japanese forces were flown on 19 March 1943. Two more squadrons in Burma 84 Squadron and 45 Squadron converted to the Vengeance, together with 7 Squadron and 8 Squadron of the Royal Indian Air Force (RIAF).

In cases of monsoon clouds, which obstructed the view during the dive, RIAF pilots practised the unconventional method of shallow bombing, releasing bombs at 800 ft (240 m) only. Enough hits were landed using this technique, that they were persuaded by commanders to use this technique when conditions were similar. Vengeances flew in support of the second Arakan campaign of 1943–1944, and defending against the Japanese attacks in the Battle of Imphal and Battle of Kohima of April–July 1944. Following the defeat of the Japanese offensive, the RAF and RIAF started to withdraw the Vengeance in favour of more versatile fighter-bombers and twin-engine light bombers; the last Vengeance operations over Burma were carried out on 16 July 1944.

After Burma service, a detachment from 110 Squadron RAF was sent to Takoradi in West Africa via the Middle East, a number of aircraft breaking down en route. Between September and December 1944, 11 Vultees took part in air-spraying trials against malarial mosquitoes, using under wing spray dispensers. Britain continued to receive large numbers of Vengeances, with bulk deliveries of Lend Lease aircraft (as opposed to those purchased directly by Britain) having only just started. Many of these surplus aircraft, including most Vengeance Mk IVs, were delivered to the UK and modified as target tugs, being used in that role by the RAF and the Fleet Air Arm (FAA). In those roles, all armament was removed from the aircraft.

=== Australia ===
Australia placed an order for 400 Vengeances as an emergency measure following the outbreak of war in the Pacific, which was met by a mixture of Lend Lease and diversions from the original British orders. While the first Vengeance was delivered to the Royal Australian Air Force (RAAF) in May 1942, the aircraft did not arrive in substantial numbers until April 1943. The RAAF's first Vengeance unit, 12 Squadron flew its first operational mission against Selaru Island in the Dutch East Indies. Squadrons equipped with the Vengeance included 12, 21 Squadron, 23 Squadron, 24 Squadron and 25 Squadron. Of these, all but 25 Squadron served briefly in the New Guinea campaign. Australian Vengeances flew their last operational sorties on 8 March 1944, as they were considered less efficient than fighter bombers, having a short range and requiring a long runway, and were withdrawn to make room for fighter bombers in the forward area. The Vengeance squadrons were re-equipped with Consolidated B-24 Liberator heavy bombers.

The view of the Vengeance's limitations is disputed by Peter Smith in Jungle Dive Bombers at War,

The precision and skill of the dive-bombing method...and its clear superiority over most other means of air attack when it came to destroying small and well-hidden targets in difficult country, was proven over and over again in the Asian jungle campaigns. Yet the men who achieved these excellent results, for such economy of effort and comparatively small loss, were but a handful of pilots who have been forgotten in the overwhelming mass of the heavy-and medium bomber fleets that were pounding both Europe and Asia by 1945.

This capacity was exemplified in the raid by 21 and 23 Squadrons RAAF on Hansa Bay. Smith wrote, "...the jungle-clad hills and islands of forgotten or unknown lands would become the major stage for the ultimate expression of the dive-bombers' skill." While the RAAF still had 58 Vengeances on order in March 1944, this order was cancelled and the aircraft were never delivered. Small numbers of Vengeances remained in service with support and trials units until 1946.

=== Brazil ===
Thirty-three V-72s and A-35s were supplied to Brazil from 1943, carrying out a few anti-submarine patrols. They were withdrawn by April 1948.

=== Free French ===
The Free French Air Force received 67 A-35As and -Bs in 1943, being used to equip three bomb groups in North Africa. The French, keen to get the aircraft operational as soon as possible did not incorporate improvements found necessary by Britain and Australia, so their aircraft proved to be unreliable and had extremely high oil consumption. The French Vengeances were restricted to training operations, being withdrawn in September 1944.

=== United States ===
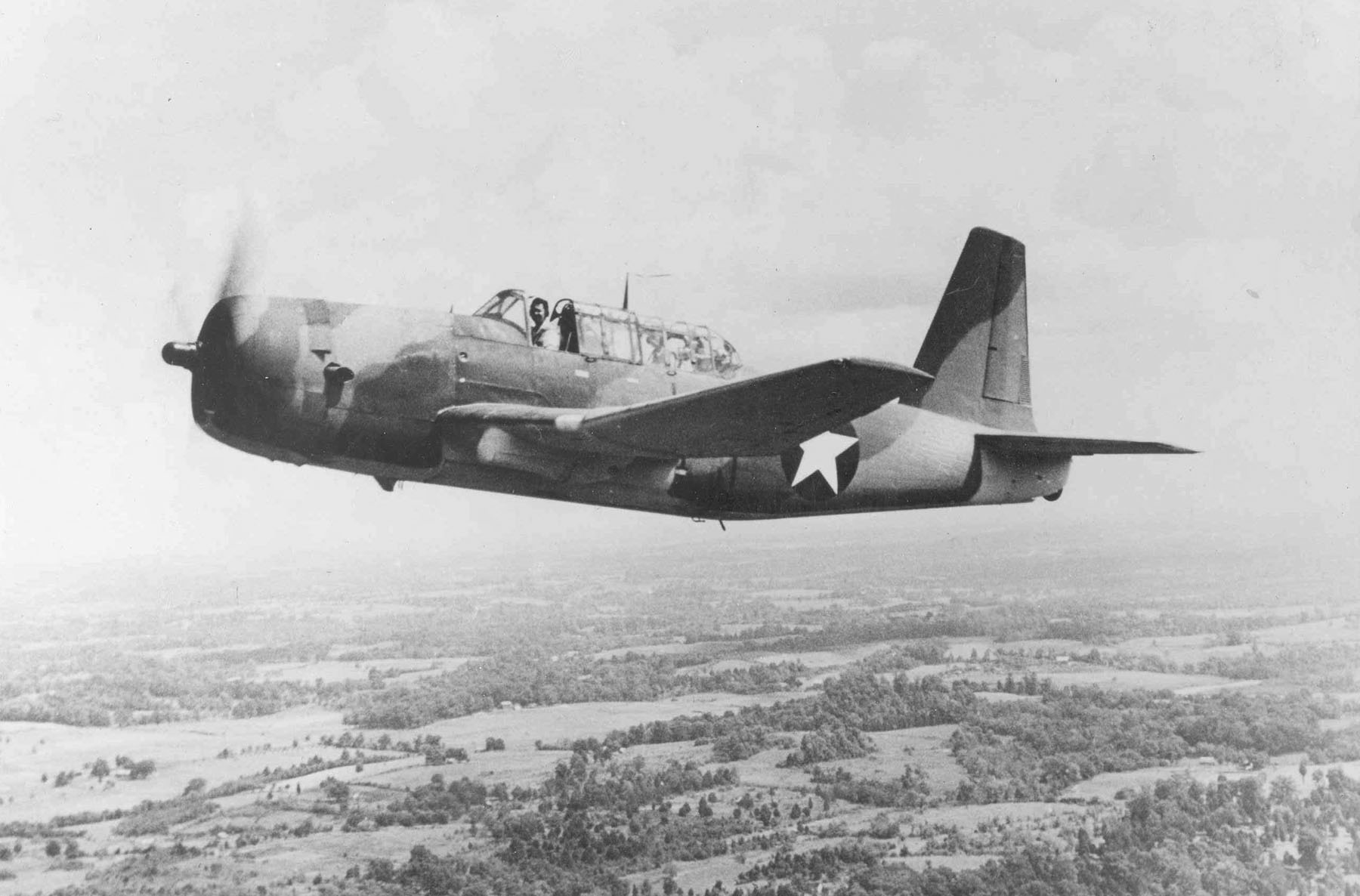
A-35B in flight. This is a target tug conversion with all armament removed.

While the US received 243 V-72s and A-31s diverted from the RAF orders together with large numbers of A-35s built for it, these saw no combat, being used as initial equipment for light bomber squadrons that re-equipped with twin-engine aircraft before deploying overseas, and as trainers or target tugs. According to other sources the A-31 saw extensive front-line combat with the 10th Air Force in China throughout the spring of 1944. As many as 60 A-31's could be fielded for a mission. The A-31 first saw combat in China on 14 March 1944, when 41 A-31's along with British aircraft hit targets in Arakan and Chin Hills China. It was last used on 25 May 1944, when 20 A-31s scored bombing hits on the Manipar R bridge at Tonzang.

From April 1944, a number of Vengeance Mk IV series Is were made available to the 8th Air Force and assigned to target-towing flights and Combat Crew Replacement Center stations. All armament was removed and a light cable winch fitted in the rear fuselage for sleeve towing. Some of these aircraft continued to be flown with British national markings and serial numbers. By late June 1944, there were seven A-35Bs at RAF Cluntoe, seven at Greencastle, ten at RAF Sutton Bridge and six at RAF East Wretham. When the CCRCs were dissolved in the autumn, the Vengeances were transferred to combat groups, with most fighter and several bomber groups having one on hand at some time during 1945. A-35Bs did not show a high state of serviceability by this time and were generally considered troublesome to maintain. They were also called RA-35B (R for Restricted) by this time.

== Variants ==
=== RAF Variants ===
Vengeance I
Vultee V-72 licence built by Northrop and ordered directly for Britain, powered by 1,600 hp (1,200 kW) R-2600-A5B engine. 200 built.
Vengeance IA
Northrop built aircraft purchased under Lend-Lease, powered by 1,600 hp (1,200 kW) R-2600-19 engine, otherwise similar to Vengeance I. USAAF designation A-31-NO. 200 built.
Vengeance II
Vultee built aircraft directly purchased by Britain. Small differences from Vengeance I. 501 built.
Vengeance III
Vultee built Lend-Lease aircraft. Similar to IA. USAAF designation A-31-VN. 200 built.
Vengeance IV
A-35B supplied under Lend-Lease to RAF and RAAF. 458 supplied to RAF and 121 to RAAF.

=== USAAF Variants ===
XA-31A
Redesignated prototype Vengeance accepted by USAAF in June 1942. Vultee designation V-88.
XA-31B
XA-31A modified as testbed for 3,000 hp (2,240 kW) Pratt & Whitney XR-4360-1 Wasp Major.
XA-31C
Vengeance III modified as testbed for 2,200 hp (1,640 kW) Wright R-3350-18 Duplex Cyclone engine. One converted.
YA-31C
Vengeance IIIs modified as testbeds for R-3350-17 engines for B-29 Superfortress. Five built.
A-35A
Redesigned version for USAAF and Lend-Lease. 4° wing incidence. Powered by 1,700 hp (1269 kW) R-2600-13 or -8 engine. Four forward-firing .50 in (12.7 mm) calibre M2 Browning machine guns and one in rear cockpit. Vultee designation V-88. 99 aircraft built.
A-35B
Modified aircraft with six forward-firing 0.50 in (12.7 mm) machine guns and additional bomb racks. 831 built.

=== Unbuilt variants ===
TBV-1 Georgia
Proposed torpedo bomber; not built.

== Operators ==
Australia

- Royal Australian Air Force
  - No. 12 Squadron RAAF
  - No. 21 Squadron RAAF
  - No. 23 Squadron RAAF
  - No. 24 Squadron RAAF
  - No. 25 Squadron RAAF
  - No. 3 Communication Unit RAAF
  - No. 4 Communication Unit RAAF
  - No. 5 Communication Unit RAAF
  - No. 6 Communication Unit RAAF
  - No. 7 Communication Unit RAAF
  - No. 9 Communication Unit RAAF

Brazil

- Brazilian Air Force
  - 1st Dive-Bombing Squadron
  - 2nd Dive-Bombing Squadron

France

- Free French Air Forces
  - GB 1/32 Bourgogne
  - GB 1/17 Picardie
  - GB 2/15 Anjou

British India

- Royal Indian Air Force
  - No. 7 Squadron IAF
  - No. 8 Squadron IAF
  - No.1 Service Flying Training School
  - No.22 Anti Aircraft Cooperation Unit
  - No.1 Target Towing Flight

United Kingdom

- Royal Air Force
  - No. 45 Squadron RAF
  - No. 82 Squadron RAF
  - No. 84 Squadron RAF
  - No. 110 Squadron RAF
  - No. 288 Squadron RAF
  - No. 289 Squadron RAF
  - No. 291 Squadron RAF
  - No. 567 Squadron RAF
  - No. 577 Squadron RAF
  - No. 587 Squadron RAF
  - No. 595 Squadron RAF
  - No. 631 Squadron RAF
  - No. 667 Squadron RAF
  - No. 679 Squadron RAF
  - No. 691 Squadron RAF
  - No. 695 Squadron RAF
- Royal Navy – Fleet Air Arm
  - 721 Naval Air Squadron
  - 733 Naval Air Squadron
  - 791 Naval Air Squadron

United States

- US Army Air Forces
  - 55th Bombardment Squadron (Dive)
  - 56th Bombardment Squadron (Dive)
  - 57th Bombardment Squadron (Dive)
  - 88th Bombardment Squadron (Dive)
  - 309th Bombardment Squadron (Dive)
  - 311th Bombardment Squadron (Dive)
  - 312th Bombardment Squadron (Dive)
  - 623rd Bombardment Squadron (Dive)
  - 628th Bombardment Squadron (Dive)
  - 629th Bombardment Squadron (Dive)
  - 630th Bombardment Squadron (Dive)
  - 631st Bombardment Squadron (Dive)

== Surviving aircraft ==
One complete Vengeance IA that did not see squadron service, serial number A27-99 (EZ999), is displayed at the Camden Museum of Aviation at Narellan, New South Wales, Australia. Components of Vengeance IIA A24-247 are held at the Historical Aircraft Restoration Society, Australia, to form the basis of a restoration project.

== Specifications (Vengeance I) ==
Vultee A-35 Vengeance 3-view drawing

Data from British Warplanes of World War II.

General characteristics

- Crew: Pilot, navigator/gunner
- Length: 39 ft 9 in (12.12 m)
- Wingspan: 48 ft 0 in (14.63 m)
- Height: 15 ft 4 in (4.67 m)
- Wing area: 332 sq ft (30.84 m^{2})
- Empty weight: 9,725 lb (4,411 kg)
- Max takeoff weight: 14,300 lb (6,486 kg)
- Powerplant: 1 × Wright R-2600-A5B-5 Twin Cyclone 14 cylinder radial air-cooled engine, 1,600 hp (1,193 kW)

Performance

- Maximum speed: 275 mph (443 km/h, 239 kn) at 11,000 ft (3,350 m)
- Cruise speed: 235 mph (378 km/h, 204 kn)
- Range: 1,400 mi (2,253 km, 1,220 nmi)
- Service ceiling: 22,500 ft (6,860 m)
- Wing loading: 43.1 lb/sq ft (210 kg/m^{2})
- Power/mass: 0.11 hp/lb (0.18 kW/kg)

Armament

- Guns: ** 4 × fixed forward-firing .30 in (7.62 mm) Browning machine guns in the wing
  - 2 × flexible mount .30 in (7.62 mm) or .303 in (7.7 mm) machine guns in rear cockpit. (Note: RAF aircraft operating over Burma replaced the .30 in (7.62 mm) Browning machine guns in the rear cockpit with British built .303 in (7.7 mm) guns owing to poor reliability of the American built guns on flexible mountings.)
- Bombs: ** 2 × internal 500 lb (230 kg) bombs
  - 2 × 250 lb (110 kg) bomb on wing racks

== See also ==
- Vultee Vengeance in Australian service

Aircraft of comparable role, configuration, and era

- Aichi D3A
- Blackburn Skua
- Breda Ba.65
- Curtiss SB2C Helldiver
- Douglas SBD Dauntless
- Junkers Ju 87
- Saab 17

Related lists

- List of aircraft of World War II
- List of aircraft of the Fleet Air Arm
- List of aircraft of the Royal Air Force

== Footnotes ==
=== Bibliography ===
- Angelucci, Enzo; Matricardi, Paolo (1978). World Aircraft: World War II. Sampson Low Guides. Vol. II. Maidenhead: Sampson Low. ISBN 0-562-00096-8.
- Carter, Kit C.; Mueller, Robert (1991). Combat Chronology 1941–1945 (PDF). US Army Air Forces in World War II (repr. ed.). Washington, DC: United States Government Printing Office. ISBN 978-0-91-279968-1. World War II anniversary edition
- Dennis, Peter; Grey, Jeffrey; Morris, Ewan; Prior, Robin; Bou, Jean (2008). The Oxford Companion to Australian Military History (2nd ed.). Melbourne: Oxford University Press. ISBN 978-0-19-551784-2.
- Donald, David, ed. (1995). American Warplanes of World War II. London: Aerospace Publishing. ISBN 1-874023-72-7.
- Freeman, Roger (1984). Mighty Eighth War Manual: Part 2, Armament and Equipment (4th ed.). London: Jane's Publishing. ISBN 0-7106-0325-8.
- Halley, James J. (1984). The Squadrons of the Royal Air Force. Tonbridge: Air Britain (Historians). ISBN 0-85130-083-9.
- Holland, James (2016). Burma '44; The Battle That Turned Britain's War In The East. London: Bantam Press. ISBN 978-0-59-307586-9.
- Lawrence, Joseph (1945). The Observer's Book Of Airplanes: Describing one hundred and eleven Types. London and New York: Frederick Warne & Co. OCLC 884470824.
- Lopes, Mario Canoniga (Spring 1994). "Talkback". Air Enthusiast. No. 53. pp. 79–80. ISSN 0143-5450.
- March, Daniel J., ed. (1998). British Warplanes of World War II. London: Aerospace Publishing. ISBN 1-874023-92-1.
- Neate, Don R. (September–October 1997). "With a Vengeance! Fighting Malaria in West Africa, Vultee-style". Air Enthusiast. No. 71. pp. 68–71. ISSN 0143-5450.
- Pelletier, Alain J. (March–April 2007). "Consumptive Vengeance: Vultee A-35s in French Service". Air Enthusiast. No. 128. Stamford: Key. pp. 75–79. ISSN 0143-5450.
- Shores, Christopher; Smith, Frank (1977). "Diving Vengeance". Air Enthusiast. No. 5. Bromley: Pilot Press. pp. 29–43. ISSN 0143-5450.
- Smith, Peter C. (1986). Vengeance! The Vultee Vengeance Dive Bomber. Shrewsbury: Airlife. ISBN 978-0-906393-65-9.
- Smith, Peter C. (1987). Jungle Dive Bombers at War. London: John Murray. ISBN 0719544254.
- Wegg, John (1990). General Dynamic Aircraft and their Predecessors. London: Putnam. ISBN 0-85177-833-X.
