= No. 24 Squadron RAAF =

Royal Australian Air Force squadron

- Crest of No. 24 Squadron
- Active: 1940–1946; 1951–current
- Allegiance: Australia
- Branch: Royal Australian Air Force
- Role: Military airbase combat support
- Part of: No. 96 Wing, Combat Support Group
- Base: RAAF Base Edinburgh
- Motto(s): "Sic Aggredere ut Defendas"
- Battle honours: Pacific 1941–1945; Darwin 1941–1944; Rabaul 1942; New Guinea 1942–1944; New Britain 1943; Markham Valley 1943–1944; Morotai; Borneo 1945

Commanders
- Notable commanders: John Lerew (1941–1942)

No. 24 Squadron is a Royal Australian Air Force squadron. The squadron was formed in 1940 and saw action as a bomber squadron during World War II serving in the Pacific theatre against the Japanese, and undertaking operations during the Battle of Rabaul, and the New Guinea, New Britain and Borneo campaigns. The squadron was disbanded in 1946 following the conclusion of hostilities, but was re-formed in 1951. From then until 2010 the squadron was an RAAF Reserve squadron located near Adelaide, South Australia; for part of this time, until 1960, the squadron continued to perform flying duties, before converting to a ground support role. In 2010, the squadron combined with Combat Support Unit Edinburgh to become a Permanent Air Force unit and it currently forms part of No. 96 Wing, Combat Support Group.

== History ==
=== World War II ===
No. 24 Squadron was formed as a general purpose squadron at RAAF Base Amberley on 17 June 1940. With an initial strength of four CAC Wirraway aircraft, it was subsequently re-equipped with Lockheed Hudsons in the second half of 1940. Tasked with patrolling Australia's northern approaches in search of German raiders and submarines, while it also undertook a range of training activities over the following months. The squadron moved to Townsville in October where it undertook coastal patrol and training flights operating a mix of Wirraway and Hudsons, as well as de Havilland Moth Minor trainers.

In early December 1941, No. 24 Squadron moved to Rabaul under the command of Wing Commander John Lerew. Following the outbreak of war in the Pacific, Rabaul came under Japanese attack on a number of occasions, but flying operations continued until 20 February 1942 when over 100 Japanese aircraft attacked Rabaul, destroying five of No. 24 Squadron's eight obsolete Wirraways (all of which had taken off to intercept the raiding force). With the squadron reduced to just three aircraft orders to attack the approaching Japanese invasion force were cancelled and the squadron was withdrawn to Townsville. The heavily outnumbered Australian Army garrison at Rabaul was later overwhelmed in the Battle of Rabaul.

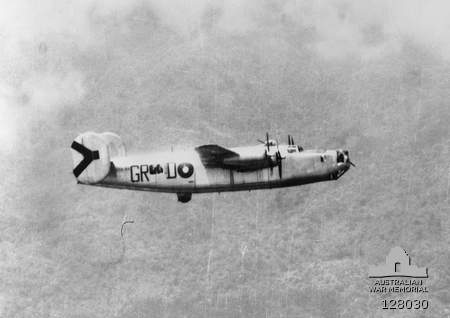
A No. 24 Squadron B-24J during a combat mission

No. 24 Squadron moved to Bankstown, New South Wales, in July 1942 where it performed training, anti-submarine and air defence patrols using a diverse assortment of aircraft. The squadron continued in this role until May 1943 when it began converting to a dive bomber squadron equipped with Vultee Vengeance aircraft. After completing its training on the Vengeance No. 24 Squadron deployed to New Guinea in August 1943 operating from Nadzab where it provided support to Australian Army and United States Marine Corps units in New Guinea and New Britain, supporting operations on the Huon Peninsula, around Shaggy Ridge and Cape Gloucester. The squadron continued in this role until March 1944, when the Vengeance was withdrawn from operational service.

In March 1944, No. 24 Squadron was withdrawn to Australia to begin preparations to convert to the heavy bomber role equipped with Consolidated B-24 Liberator aircraft. The squadron was assigned to No. 82 Wing RAAF and flew its first combat sorties with these new aircraft in September 1944. Operating from bases in the Northern Territory the squadron continued to fly bombing and anti-shipping strikes against Japanese forces in the Netherlands East Indies. A detachment deployed to Palawan, in the Philippines, and later in the war, the squadron deployed to Morotai Island and then Balikpapan to support Operation Oboe. Following the Japanese surrender No. 24 Squadron was used to ferry liberated Australian prisoners of war home before being disbanded at RAAF Station Tocumwal on 15 May 1946.

=== Post-war ===
No. 24 Squadron was re-formed at Mallala, South Australia as a Citizens Air Force (reserve) fighter squadron on 30 April 1951. The squadron was allocated a fighter role, and was equipped with P-51 Mustang fighters and Wirraway training aircraft, being the only CAF squadron to operate Mustangs for the entire post-war period with all others operating jet aircraft. The squadron later received a number of Tiger Moths and Winjeels and undertook a range of training and exercises, often on weekends, as well as training cadet pilots. During this period the squadron lost two pilots killed in separate incidents in 1957. On 1 March 1960 the squadron became an RAAF (Auxiliary) unit, with the squadron moving to a temporary base in North Adelaide. Meanwhile, in May two Vampire jet aircraft became available to the unit.

However, in June 1960 the squadron ceased operations as a flying squadron, following a reorganisation of the CAF. Since this date No. 24 Squadron has been a non-flying RAAF Reserve squadron based at RAAF Base Edinburgh near Adelaide. The squadron was affiliated with No. 1 Squadron based at Amberley, Queensland and trained on maintaining the Canberra bomber. Following the transfer of No. 11 Squadron to Edinburgh in 1968, the unit was affiliated with that unit, retraining on servicing the Lockheed P-3 Orion. In 1977 the Squadron change affiliation again, this time to No. 92 Wing and its personnel continued to work on the Orions. On 28 May 1979, the squadron received the Freedom of Entry to the City of Adelaide. The Freedom Scroll was presented at a ceremonial parade by the Lord Mayor, The Right Honourable Mr George Joseph. In 1981 No. 24 Squadron affiliated with RAAF Base Edinburgh, supporting the flying and base units posted there. In 2010, the squadron combined with Combat Support Unit Edinburgh to once again become a Permanent Air Force unit; it forms part of No. 96 Wing.

== Aircraft operated ==
No. 24 Squadron operated the following aircraft at various times:

- CAC Wirraway
- de Havilland Moth Minor
- Lockheed Hudson
- Ford Trimotor
- Bell Airacobra
- Fairey Battle
- Brewster Buffalo
- Vultee Vengeance
- Consolidated B-24 Liberator
- North American P-51 Mustang
- de Havilland Tiger Moth
- CAC Winjeel

== See also ==
- Vultee Vengeance in Australian service
