= Airfield Defence Guards =

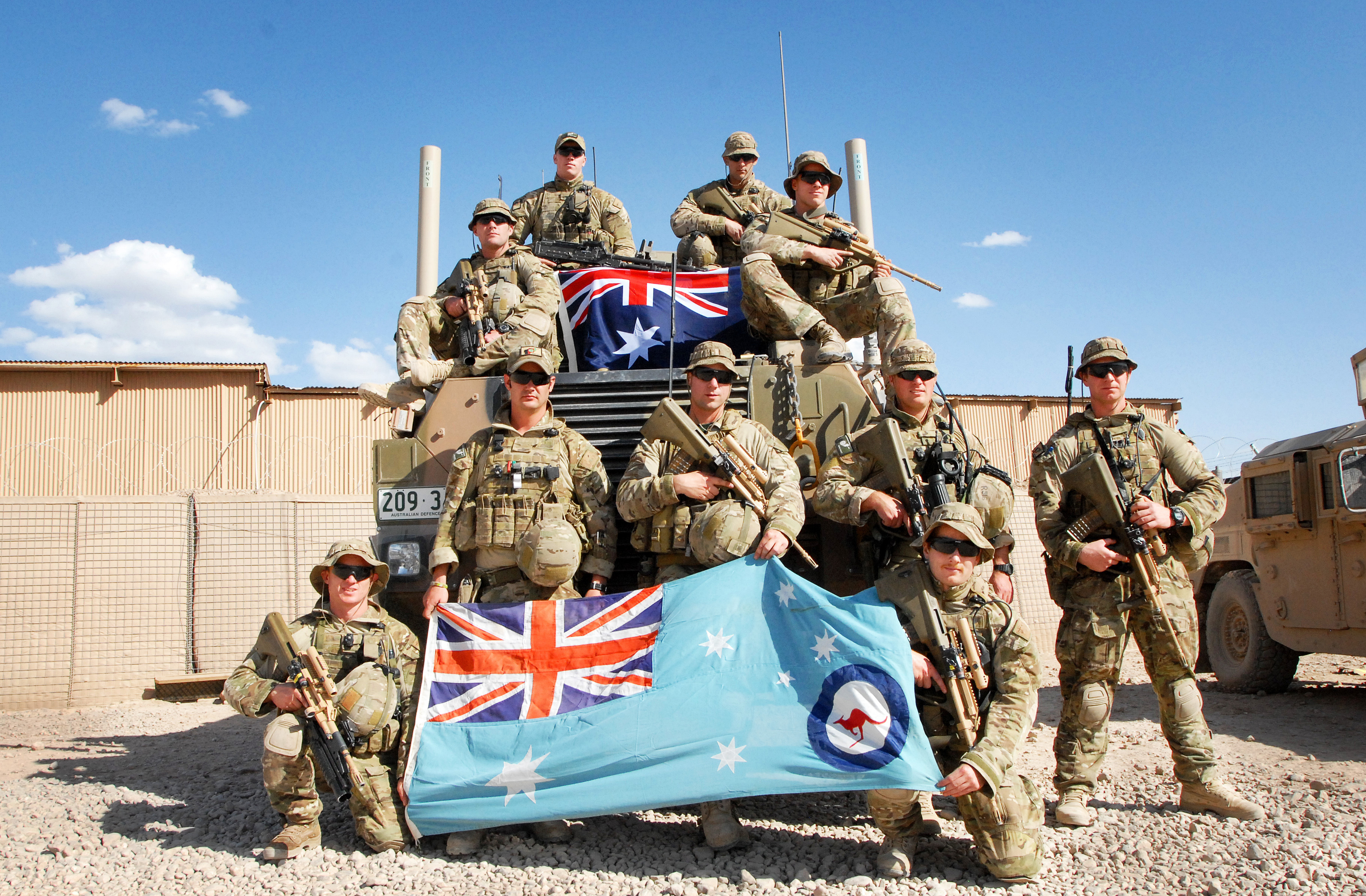
- Royal Australian Air Force security force personnel in Afghanistan during 2013
- Active: 1 October 1942 – present
- Country: Australia
- Branch: Royal Australian Air Force
- Type: Air Force Infantry
- Size: 2 Squadrons
- Part of: Combat Support Group
- Garrison/HQ: 1SECFOR – Newcastle; 2SECFOR – Ipswich
- Nickname: "Adgies"
- Motto: Protect the Force

Airfield Defence Guards (ADG) are a mustering of the Royal Australian Air Force (RAAF) that are dedicated to the security and ground defence of airbases and other military aviation assets. Other duties include instructing other RAAF personnel, in skills such as the handling of small arms and infantry tactics.

The mustering's members, commonly known as "Adgies", are mostly employed in RAAF Security Force (SECFOR) squadrons. Previously a Direct-Entry role, the ADG mustering has since become a specialist role for SECFOR members and only after serving a minimum 12 months can be applied for, where applicants are invited to a course. The role of SECFOR squadrons is the protection of RAAF equipment, personnel, assets and facilities, by countering attacks by the enemy including their special forces, infantry, local banditry, guerilla's, terrorist's and other irregular military.

ADGs are commanded by Squadron Leaders (SQNLDR) and assisted by Flight Lieutenants (FLTLT) and Flying Officers (FLGOFF) who are commissioned officers known as Ground Defence Officers (GRDEFO) they receive initial training at the Australian Army's Royal Military College (RMC), Duntroon. Following graduation from RMC, GRDEFOs undertake the Army Regimental Officer Basic Course (Infantry) prior to RAAF-specific training at the RAAF Security and Fire School (RAAFSFS), at RAAF Base Amberley.

ADG are comparable to the British Royal Air Force Regiment, and the USAF Security Forces.

== History ==
=== Pre World War II ===
From 1929 the RAAF began to establish an Aerodrome Defence Scheme (ADS), primarily utilizing aircraft personnel to provide local defence of airfields, although it was initially limited in scope. Following the acquisition of the required equipment training began in 1931, including in both anti-aircraft and ground defence roles. Between 1931 and 1939 this also included exercises with the Army, during which Aerodrome Defence Sections defended an area against attacks by Australian Army units and RAAF aircraft. In 1939 it was directed that the scheme be expanded to include all units and stations.

=== Second World War ===
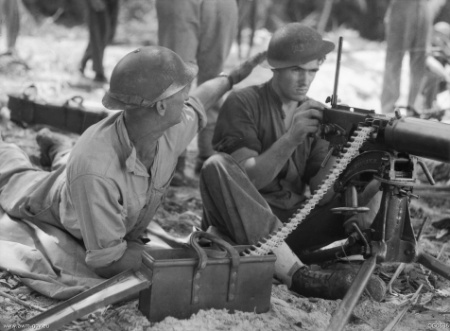
Aerodrome Defence Guards manning a Vickers Gun, 1944

While the RAAF did not face a significant ground threat in the first years of World War II, an Air Force Guard mustering was proposed in 1940. This mustering was to receive training in infantry tactics to defend RAAF bases against attack and would be modelled on the Royal Air Force Regiment. The idea never progressed and those recruited for the task were assigned to other mustering's. Following the bombing of Darwin in 1942 and ground attacks on Allied air bases, it was realised that the RAAF needed to defend its own airfields and that ground defence training was required for RAAF personnel.

Following a request to the Army, Lieutenant Colonel H.H. Carr was seconded to the RAAF from 2/22 Battalion AIF in May 1942. Further secondments of infantry officers and NCOs followed and the RAAF Defence School was established at Hamilton, Victoria in September of that year. The school commenced training Army and RAAF officers and NCOs as Aerodrome Defence Officers and Aerodrome Defence Instructors, who were then posted to RAAF units to deliver ground defence training.

In October 1942, the Security Guards Unit was formed at Livingstone Field, Northern Territory. All RAAF guards were posted to this unit, irrespective of where they were serving. The Security Guards Unit was charged with providing guards for operational bases both within Australia and overseas. Trainees were instructed in the employment of anti-aircraft guns, ground patrolling, scouting and hand-to-hand combat. At first the unit had a strength of 567 personnel, increasing to 943 by July 1943; in that year the unit moved to Darwin. The unit was renamed No. 1 Airfield Defence Squadron in April 1945.

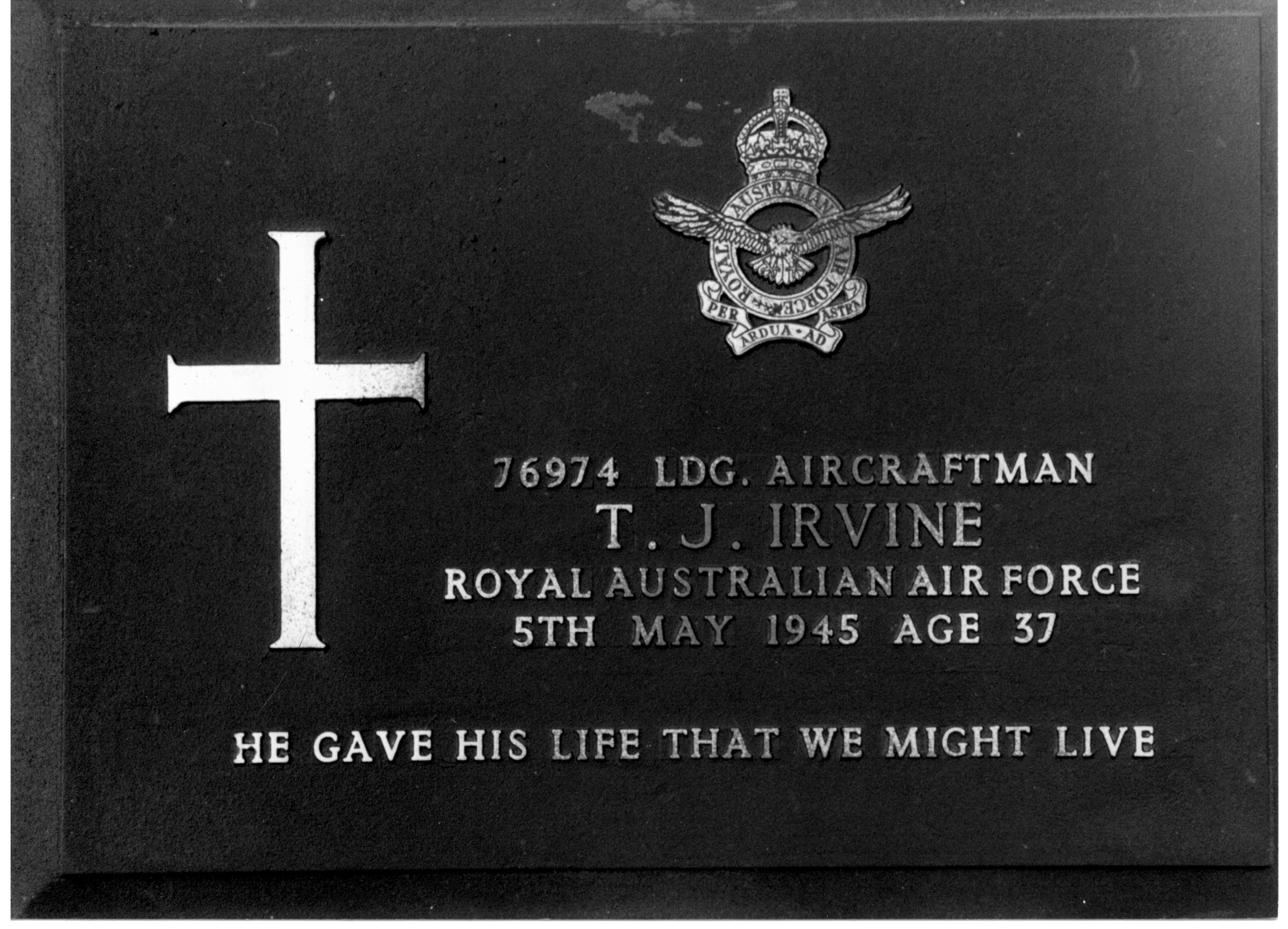
The gravestone of Leading Aircraftman Thomas Irvine, Labuan

A second unit, the Defence Pool, was established at Noemfoor in December 1944. It is believed that guards may have been trained at the Security Guards Unit and then posted to the Defence Pool for operational deployment. A detachment of the Defence Pool was deployed to Morotai island in early 1945 in order to prepare a camp for the arrival of the main party of the unit. The Defence Pool was subsequently ordered to be disbanded on 28 March 1945. A reconsideration led to the establishment of No. 2 Airfield Defence Squadron.

By May 1945, ADGs had participated in a number of operations, including the recapture of Tarakan, Brunei and Balikpapan. They suffered casualties, among them Leading Aircraftman Thomas Irvine and Corporal Clarence Tully who were killed during Japanese raids on Tarakan airfield. LAC Irvine died on 5 May 1945 and is believed to be the first ADG killed by enemy action. He is buried in the Commonwealth War Graves Cemetery on Labuan Island.

=== Cold War ===
==== Post War ====
Following the end of hostilities, both Airfield Defence Squadrons were disbanded on 19 November 1945. Aerodrome Defence Officers (ADOs) and Aerodrome Defence Instructors (ADIs) were retained to deliver basic ground defence instruction to RAAF members during initial and continuation training. A significant proportion of RAAF National Service recruits received training in ground defence techniques. This included the use of the .303 rifle, Thompson Sub-Machine Gun, Bren Light Machine Gun and hand grenades, in addition to fieldcraft skills. No. 1 Airfield Defence Squadron was re-established at Mallala, South Australia as a National Service unit in 1951, then once again disbanded in 1952. There is evidence to suggest that the RAAF considered the introduction of an armoured car capability in the 1950s, with ADIs attending training on Staghound vehicles with the Army at Puckapunyal; this project was never brought to fruition.

In June 1965 a submission to the Air Board requested the establishment of 455 positions to provide for the defence of the eleven major RAAF bases in Australia, as well as overseas bases in Malaysia, Thailand and South Vietnam. In the end, the ADG mustering was re-established in October 1965 with an authorised strength of 220 new positions in addition to the remustering of all Drill Instructors and ADGs. After the outbreak of the Vietnam War, Australia was asked to increase its level of commitment. To meet these new demands, the RAAF deployed a number of aircraft to Phan Rang Airbase, South Vietnam, in 1966. The USAF Security Police unit assigned to the base, asked the RAAF to contribute to the defence of the base.

==== Vietnam War ====
ADG Flights were deployed to South Vietnam with 2 Squadron at Phan Rang Air Base and No. 1 Operational Support Unit (1OSU) at Vung Tau. ADGs were also deployed to Ubon Air Base, Thailand to protect the RAAF detachment based there, including 79 Squadron flying Sabre jets. In Vietnam ADGs conducted both static security tasks and security patrols outside the base perimeter, disrupting the Viet Cong ability to conduct stand-off attacks against the bases. Corporal N.E. Power became the first airman to win the Military Medal (MM) since the Second World War for a night action on 11 February 1970, during which an enemy reconnaissance party was successfully ambushed near the perimeter of the Phan Rang base. Airfield Defence Guards also provided most of the door gunners on UH-1 Iroquois helicopters with No. 9 Squadron during the war.

When the government of South Vietnam collapsed in 1975, Australia ordered the evacuation of its embassy in Saigon. The final mission undertaken by ADGs in Vietnam was to provide security for the evacuation. The "last" evacuation aircraft was severely overloaded and four ADGs were left on the tarmac at Tan Son Nhut airfield, each armed with a pistol and four rounds of ammunition; a C-130 was diverted from Thailand to evacuate them later in the day. Over 350 ADGs served in Vietnam, six being killed in the conflict. In addition to the MM awarded to Powers, GRDEFOs and ADGs were awarded an MBE, eight mentions in dispatches and four Distinguished Flying Medals of the ten awarded to RAAF members.

==== 1972–1999 ====
After withdrawal from Vietnam the ADG mustering was reduced in numbers, with Rifle Flights posted to RAAF Bases Amberley, Fairbairn, Richmond and Williamtown and ADGs manning instructional posts at other establishments. Although the RAAF contemplated disbanding the mustering in the mid-1980s, the years between the Vietnam War and the 1999 deployment to East Timor were spent consolidating tactics and techniques such as reconnaissance skills and Quick Reaction Force (QRF) operations. 2AFDS was reformed on 17 March 1983 with the headquarters located at RAAF Base Richmond and the Rifle Flights remaining dispersed. The unit was eventually consolidated at RAAF Base Amberley in January 1989. It regularly deployed on RAAF and joint exercises such as those in the Kangaroo series along with occasional deployments to Malaysia and New Zealand.

New capabilities were trialled, such as scout dogs to aid in detection and tracking of enemy parties and the employment on Exercise Pitch Black 1990 of M113 Armoured Personnel Carriers from the Army's 2nd Cavalry Regiment to provide armoured mobility for the QRF. Both capabilities may be considered to have matured in recent years with the attachment of Security Police (SECPOL) Military Working Dog (MWD) teams to ADG patrols and the introduction into RAAF service of the Bushmaster Infantry Mobility Vehicles. In 1992 2AFDS became the first non-flying unit to be awarded the Duke of Gloucester Cup.

The period saw a generational change in weapons and equipment on issue to ADGs; jungle green uniforms were replaced by the Disruptive Pattern Combat Uniform (DPCU), the L1A1 Self-Loading Rifle (SLR), M16 and F1 Sub-Machine Gun were replaced by the F88 Austeyr assault rifle and Vietnam-era radios were replaced with the Raven series of VHF and HF sets. ADGs continued to deliver weapon and ground defence training to RAAF personnel and provided the majority of instructors for recruit, apprentice and initial officer training.

The scope of this role, the longest and most continuous of the ADG mustering and its predecessors, may be gauged by the delivery of conversion training from the L1A1 SLR to the F88 rifle for every member of the RAAF. At the same time the Ground Defence Training Sections, manned on each base by 3–5 ADGs and GRDEFOs, commenced delivery of additional ground defence training for all RAAF members as the service transitioned to an expeditionary role.

In 1992 1AFDS was reformed at RAAF Base Tindal, Northern Territory as a Ready Reserve unit. The Ready Reserve Scheme involved recruits enlisting for 12 months full-time service, completing identical recruit and trade training to that undertaken by regular airmen, followed by 4 years part-time service. The cadre staff of 1AFDS consisted of Permanent Air Force (PAF) GRDEFOs and ADG NCOs; while the Ready Reserve Scheme was abolished in 1996, the RAAF implemented the Ground Defence Reserve Group based upon a similar concept, although with the full-time service commitment reduced to 9 months. This scheme is still in operation.

As individuals or in small groups, ADGs and GREDFOs deployed on peacekeeping operations in the Sinai and Bougainville, were attached to Army units providing Rifle Company Butterworth rotations and deployed to the Middle East with No. 33 Squadron in 1998. 2AFDS also deployed a Rifle Flight to assist with the evacuation of civilians from Cambodia in 1997 as part of Operation Vista.

=== Current history ===
==== East Timor ====
Whilst preparing for deployment to Exercise Crocodile 99, 2AFDS, along with No. 381 Expeditionary Combat Support Squadron (381ECSS) and 382ECSS, were warned out for duty in East Timor on Operation Warden. Both 381ECSS and 382ECSS had ADGs and GRDEFOs on strength. 2AFDS and 381ECSS commenced deployment to Comoro Airfield, Dili, on 20 September 1999. 381ECSS began arriving at Cakung Airfield, Baucau on 11 October 1999.

2AFDS undertook static security, access control and reconnaissance patrol tasks, in addition to establishing observation posts and providing a Quick Reaction Force (QRF). Reinforcements arrived on 4 November 1999 comprising 37 members of 3AFDS, an integrated permanent and reserve squadron headquartered at RAAF Base Amberley, disbanded in December 2006. The additional manpower allowed the squadron to assume responsibility for the Dili heliport in December.

2AFDS was awarded a Meritorious Unit Citation and the Commanding Officer, Squadron Leader J.D. Leo, received the Distinguished Service Medal for performance during Operation Warden.

==== Solomon Islands ====
ADGs and GRDEFOs deployed to Henderson Field, Honiara as part of the RAAF component of Joint Task Force 635 on Operation Anode, the ADF contribution to the Regional Assistance Mission to Solomon Islands (RAMSI). Following severe rioting in April 2006, members of 2AFDS were deployed as part of the ADF response to support police in reestablishing law and order. A further link with the Solomon Islands exists via Protective Service Officer Adam Dunning of the Australian Federal Police, who was shot and killed in Honiara in December 2004. Although deployed to the Solomon Islands in his civilian role, Dunning was a reservist ADG and had previously served with 2AFDS in East Timor.

==== Iraq ====
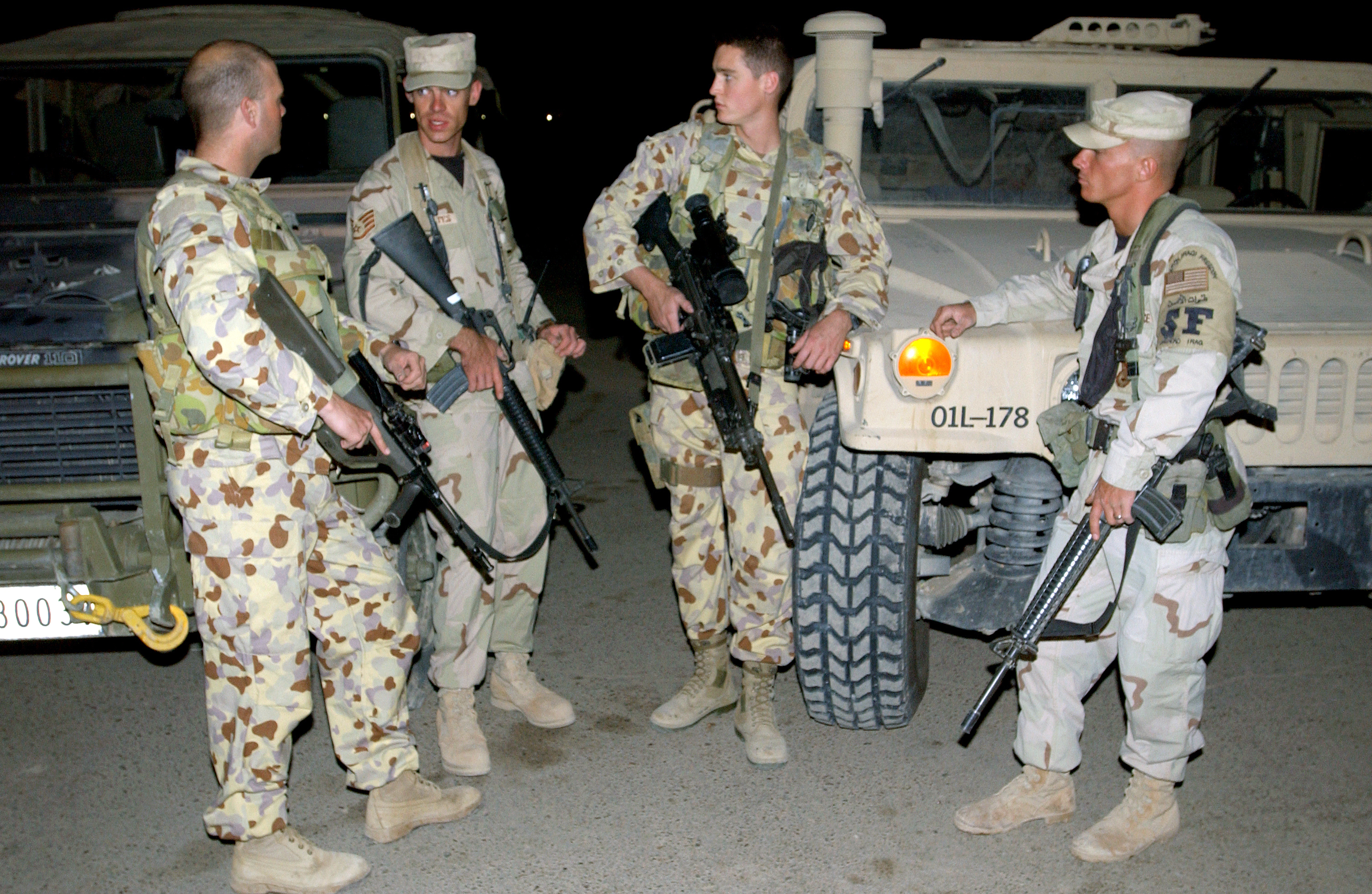
Two Airfield Defence Guards (at left and second from the right) with members of the USAF 447th Expeditionary Security Forces Squadron at Baghdad International Airport

As part of Operation Catalyst, ADGs provided force protection to the RAAF air traffic control detachment at Baghdad International Airport, during 2003–04. Thirteen ADGs from 2AFDS deployed to Baghdad with Security Detachment (SECDET) 13, the Australian combat team providing security for the Australian Embassy and close protection for officials. The ADGs were integrated within the infantry component of SECDET 13, drawn from the 7th Battalion, Royal Australian Regiment (7RAR). The Commanding Officer 7RAR, Lieutenant Colonel Shane Gabriel, commenced his military career as an RAAF GRDEFO, serving with 2AFDS and as Base Ground Defence Officer, RAAF Base Tindal; he had also served with the RAF Regiment.

==== Afghanistan ====
===== Tarin Kowt =====
A squadron minus contingent of members from both no. 1 and 2 Airfield Defence Squadrons' took responsibility for the ground defence, in and around Multinational base Tarin Kowt (MNB-TK) from October 2012. The combined effort consisted of 2 rotations (SECFOR 1 & SECFOR 2), as part of the wider Australian Task Force 1 (AFT 1). The role of SECFOR 1 & 2 included: providing force protection within MNB-TK, conducting dis-mounted and mounted ground defence patrols within the surrounding areas of MNB-TK, providing a Quick Reaction Force (QRF) for hostile ground & in-direct fire attacks and providing security for entry control points.

The second rotation (SECFOR2) continued operations until international efforts were downscaled and allied forces commenced exfiltration in early 2014. Responsibility for MNB-TK was eventually handed over to the Afghan National Army (ANA) in late 2014.

===== Kandahar =====
The RAAF Control and Reporting Centre, based at Kandahar airport, included an embedded ground defence element which provided specialist force protection advice. This deployment formed part of Operation Slipper, the ADF contribution to the International Security Assistance Force (ISAF). ADGs continue to be deployed to the Middle East Area of Operations (MEAO) in small numbers to provide specialist support to operations.

==== Other operations ====
In addition to the major campaigns listed above, in recent years ADGs have been involved in a range of smaller scale operations. These have included Operation Gold, the provision of ADF support to the Sydney Olympic Games in 2000; Operation Deluge, the provision of security to the 2007 Asia-Pacific Economic Co-operation Forum meetings in Sydney; and Operation Ramp, the evacuation of Australian and foreign nationals from Lebanon in 2006 during the conflict between Israeli forces and Hezbollah.

2AFDS was presented with a squadron standard by the Governor-General of Australia, Her Excellency Dame Quentin Bryce, at RAAF Base Amberley on 19 May 2011

Members are enlisted as ADGs in the Permanent Air Force for an initial period of service of four years; those joining the Ground Defence Reserve Group are employed on full-time service for 11 months, followed by 4 years part-time service. Once a candidate has successfully completed RAAF recruit training they attend the 15-week ADG Basic course at the RAAF Security and Fire School (RAAFSFS) RAAF Amberley, Queensland. Upon completion of trade training ADGs may wear the blue-grey beret which identifies them as a ground defence specialist.

Airmen graduate from ADG Basic course with the rank of Aircraftman (AC) and are posted to one of the 2 Security Forces Squadrons. Following a further 12 months service and favorable reporting, ADGs are reclassified to the rank of Leading Aircraftman (LAC). Post-graduate training may be undertaken to qualify in communications, field engineering/assault pioneer, direct fire support weapons, close personal protection and sniping; the majority of these courses being undertaken at Army training establishments.

Further promotion is based upon minimum periods in rank, successful completion of appropriate trade and promotion courses, performance reporting and availability of positions. All ADGs must qualify as weapon instructors prior to promotion to NCO rank. Out of mustering postings may be available, with ADGs having served within Australia's Federation Guard, as career advisers within a Defence Recruiting Centre and as Military Skills Instructors (MSIs) at No. 1 Recruit Training Unit (1RTU), RAAF Base Wagga Wagga and Officer Training School (OTS), RAAF Base East Sale.

== Current structure ==
Formerly, graduates from the RAAF Security & Fire School were placed into either 1AFDS or 2AFDS. However, in late 2013, with the procurement of new aircraft, such as the F-35 Lightning II, both Airfield Defence Squadrons were merged with the RAAF Security Police, Airbase Protection and RAAF Military Working Dog Handlers to form Numbers 1 and 2 Security Forces Squadrons (SECFOR), boosting the strength and capability of protecting the new assets. Along with these changes, 1SECFOR was relocated to RAAF Base Williamtown, The ADG mustering may be broadly divided into those positions contained within a Security Forces Squadron and those within other units. Within Combat Support Group, No. 95 Wing commands the two Security Forces Squadrons.

- No. 1 Security Forces Squadron (1SECFOR)—RAAF Base Williamtown
- No. 2 Security Forces Squadron (2SECFOR)— RAAF Base Amberley

=== Former ===
- No. 3 Security Forces Squadron (3 SECFOR)—RAAF Base Edinburgh – Disbanded in October 2022.

Security Forces Squadrons structure

Security Forces Squadrons are commanded by a SQNLDR with a FLTLT as 2IC and comprising a number Force Elements;

Up to five Rifle Flights each comprising a Flight HQ of FLTOFF, SGT and two CPL/LAC and 3 Rifle Sections of ten personnel each, which can be further divided down to two Patrols of five Personnel (commanded by Ground Defence Officers and manned by Airfield Defence Guards),

Up to five Security Flights/Detachments of varying size's (generally manned by Air Force Security Flight personnel, Security Police Officers and Military Working Dog Handlers ) at the bases within the unit's area of responsibility.

All Flights/Detachments contribute to the security of air and space power within Australia and overseas. Rifle Flights are capable of security tasks in low to high threat environments, while Security Flights/Detachments normally conduct security tasks in low threat environments. Generally, Security Forces Squadrons conduct the wide range of security tasks using an integrated workforce approach. Ground Defence Officers, Airfield Defence Guards, Air Force Security personnel and Security Police Officers often work in mixed teams, tailored to the task, threat and environment.

Permanent Air Force Airfield Defence Guards NCOs may be posted to a Ground Defence Training Section (GDTS) at any major RAAF base in Australia or to certain training units within Air Force Training Group. GDTS staff undertake both a training role and provide specialist advice to unit commanders. Reserve NCOs may be posted to a SECFOR Squadron, or to an instructional post or Reserve Airbase Protection Flight within one of the RAAF's 'City' Squadrons (Nos. 13, 21, 22, 23, 24, 25, 26, 27, 28, 29, 30 & 31 SQNs). ADG Warrant Officers (WOFFs) may be posted to staff or policy positions within a higher headquarters.

In addition to their operational role ADG instructors provide essential training to the remainder of the RAAF. This includes the following:

- Weapon handling, ground defence and security tactics at a Ground Defence Training Section at any RAAF Base in Australia,
- Chemical, Biological, Radiologican and Nuclear - Defence.(CBRN-D),
- 1RTU and OTS at the Australian Defence Force Academy (ADFA), Canberra;
- Combat Survival Training School (CSTS, also known as COMSURV), RAAF Base Townsville; or
- RAAF Security & Fire School, RAAF Base Amberley.

== Duties and mission roles ==
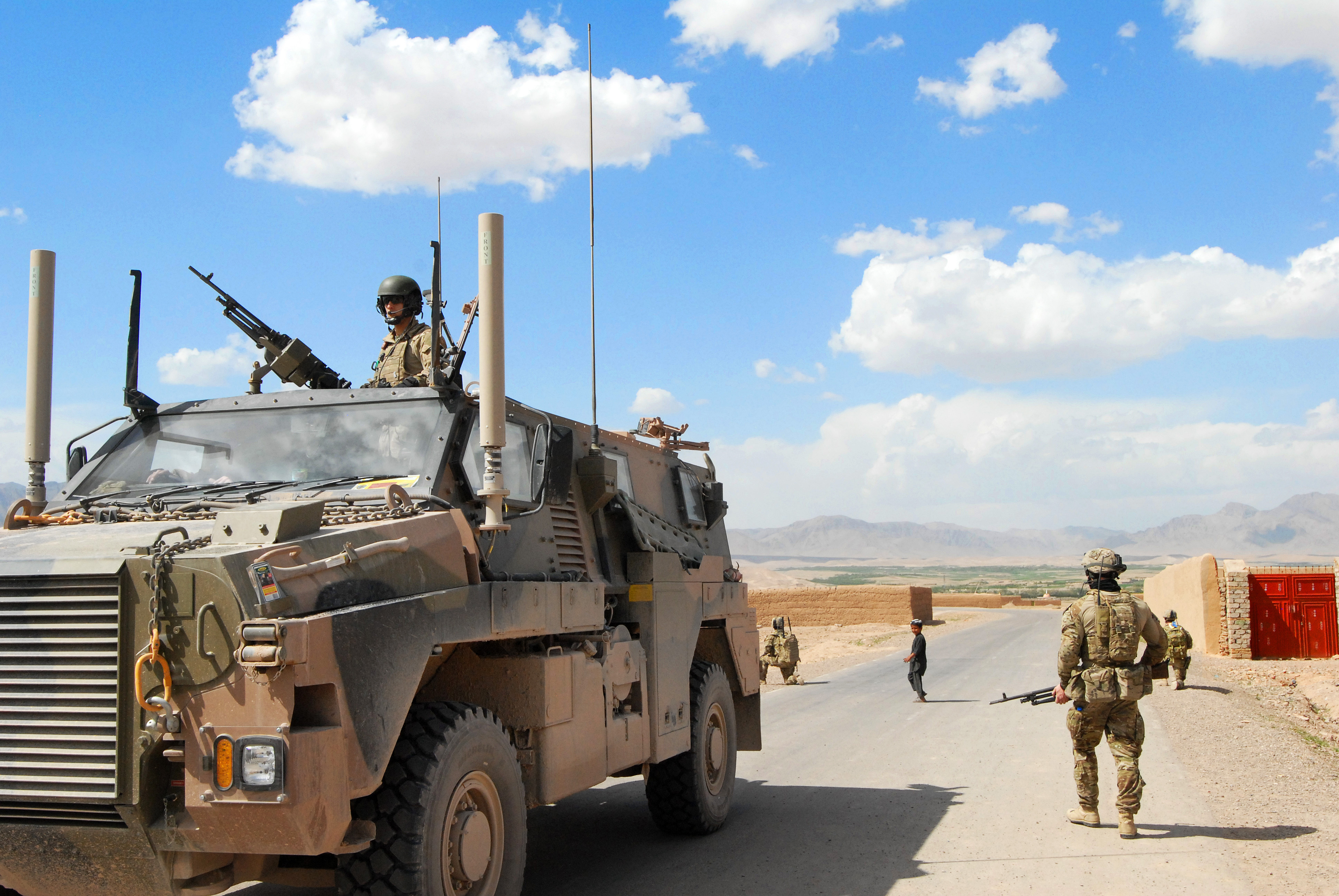
RAAF security force personnel patrolling through Tarin Kowt in Afghanistan, 2013

ADGs form the basis of the Air Force's ground combat force, protecting Base assets, infrastructure and personnel against attack by enemy ground forces. For planning purposes, a nominal Area of Operations (AO) for RAAF ground defence is usually extends to five kilometres from the airfield perimeter fence. In practice, the AO assigned to ADGs is determined by variables such as available forces, terrain, vegetation etc. ADGs are trained and equipped to locate, fix and destroy enemy ground forces, ideally during the reconnaissance phase of any intended attack on RAAF assets.

This is achieved by the deployment of multiple patrol teams, usually consisting of 4-5 members, undertaking reconnaissance patrols, observation and listening posts. These teams are supported by specialist elements including snipers operating in a counter-sniper role. Once the enemy are located, forces are concentrated to engage and destroy their capability to complete their task. ADGs also provide a Base Commander with a Quick Reaction Force (QRF) mounted in wheeled vehicles. QRF teams are heavily armed and act as a mobile reserve to provide a counter-attack or counter-penetration capability should an enemy evade the patrol screen.

=== Tasks performed by ADGs ===
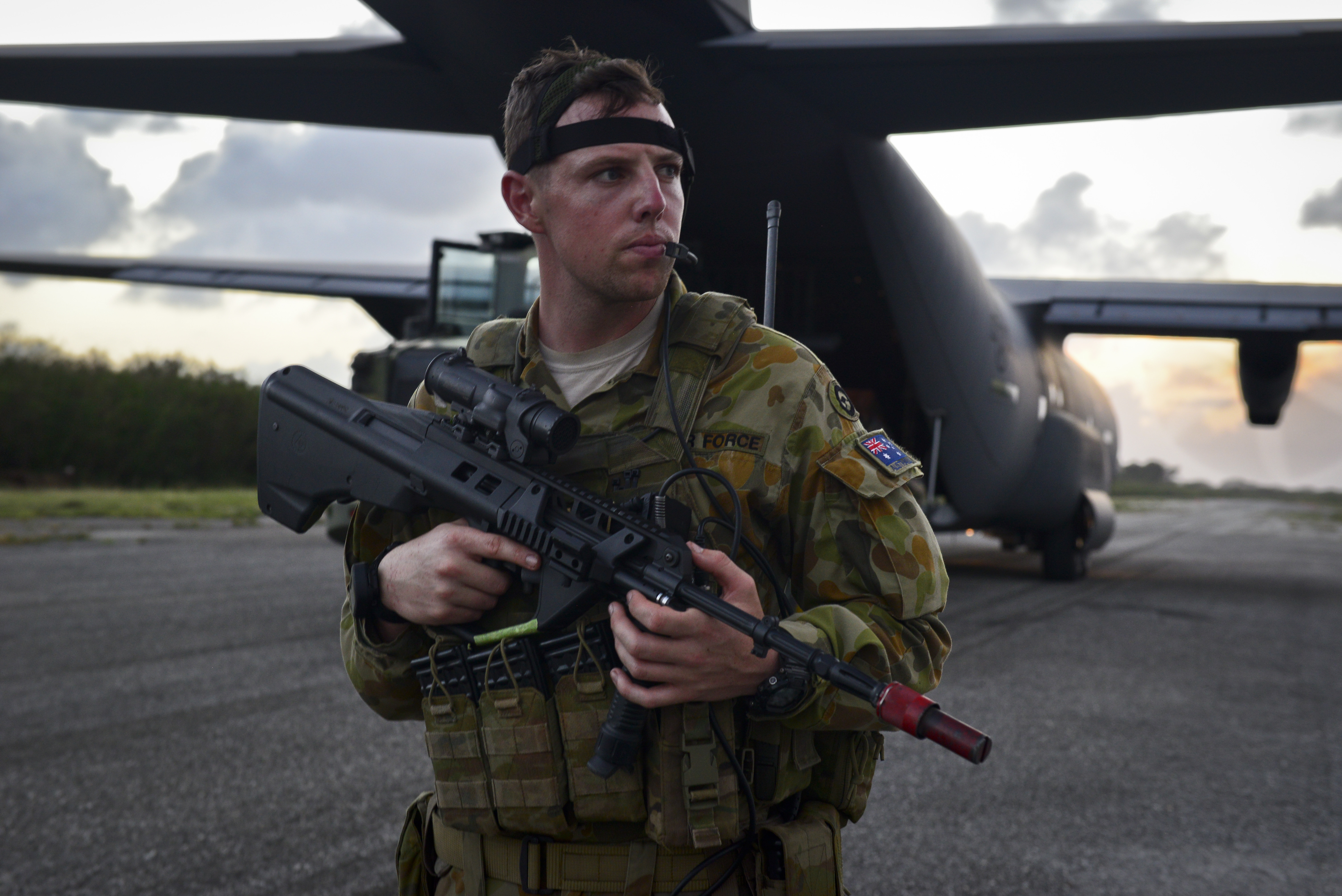
A RAAF security forces member with a C-130J Hercules aircraft during an exercise in 2018

- patrolling over extended periods over arduous terrain and in extreme climatic conditions carrying a specified load necessary to accomplish the mission;
- foot and vehicle patrolling by day and by night in and around both established and bare base airfields and through vegetated or urban environments in all extremities of weather conditions and locations within or outside of Australia;
- manning of Observation Posts (OPs), Listening Posts (LPs) and standing patrols to detect and interdict enemy movement
- Quick Reaction Force (QRF) duties in response to identified threats;
- Aircraft Security Operations providing protection to both aircraft and infrastructure;
- construction of field defences and obstacles such as weapon pits and bunkers, fences and vehicle check points (VCPs);
- search and clearance operations;
- manning of crew served weapons such as machine guns and anti-armour weapons;
- security for special events;
- executive protection
- Disposal of Malfunction Explosive Ordnance (DMEO)
- instruction on small arms including pistols, rifles, shotguns and Light Support Weapons (LSWs);
- instruction in Chemical, Biological, Radiological and Nuclear -Defence (CBRN-D); and
- instruction in individual and unit ground defence tactics and techniques.

== Equipment ==
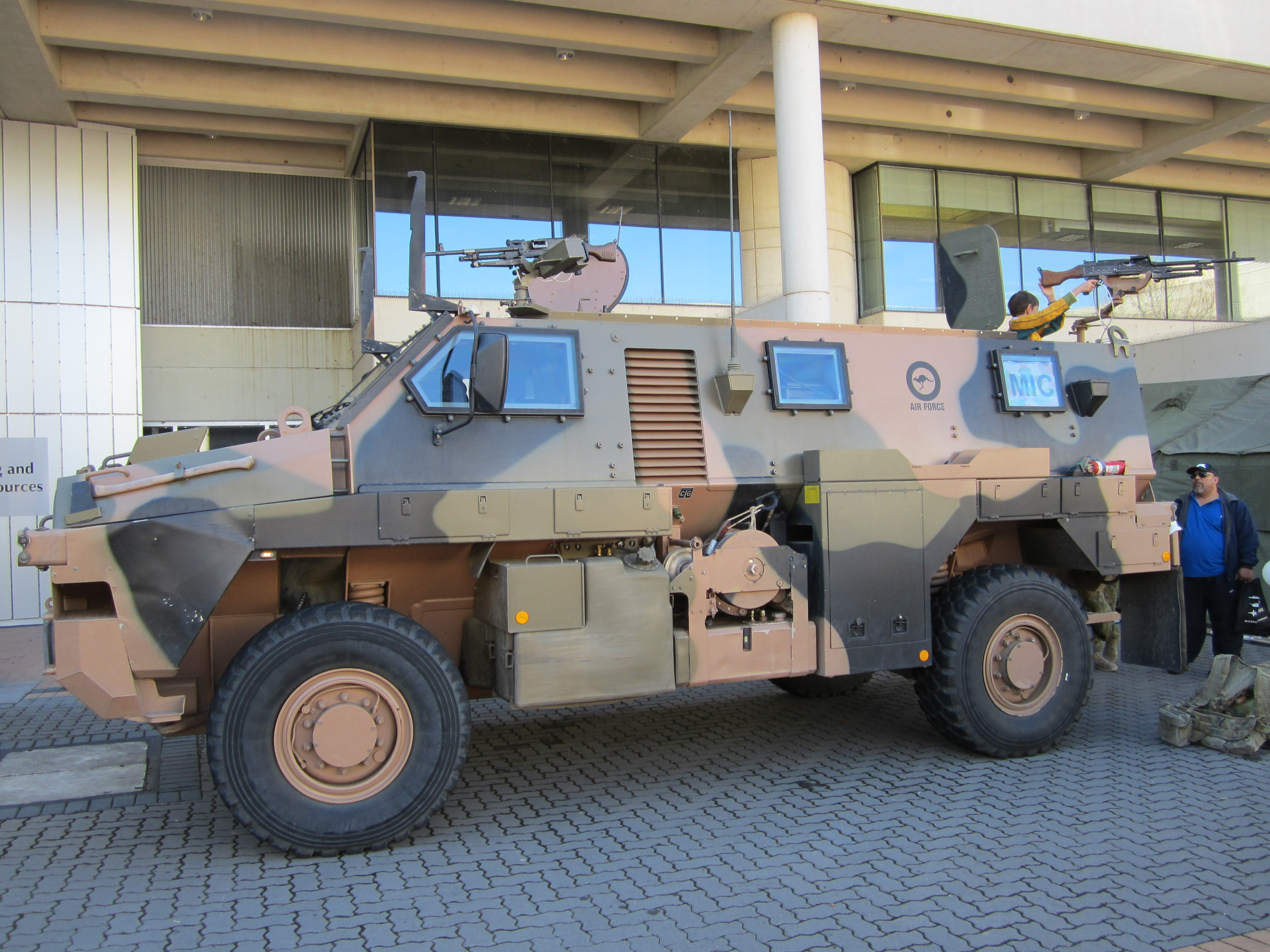
An RAAF Bushmaster

The weapons and equipment issued to ADGs are similar to standard Australian infantry equipment.

=== Weapons ===
- L9A1/L9A3 Self-loading Pistol (Browning Hi-Power)
- EF88 Enhanced F88 Rifle
- Heckler & Koch MP5 sub-machine gun
- Remington Model 870 12-gauge shotgun
- SR25 Marksman Rifle
- Accuracy International SR-98 sniper rifle
- F89 Light Support Weapon (Minimi)
- MAG58 General-Purpose Machine Gun
- Mk 47 Striker LWAGL
- Carl Gustav recoilless rifle
- SL 40 Grenade launcher (as part of the EF88 Enhanced F88 Rifle)
- M72 Light Anti-armour Weapon
- F1 Fragmentation Grenade
- F2 Blast Grenade
- M18A1 Claymore Antipersonnel Mine

The primary weaponry used by ADGs consists of the EF88 Austeyr (with or without the SL40 Grenade Launcher Attachment), F89 Minimi, and the Browning Hi-Power Self Loading Pistol. While the other weapons are occasionally used, they are more dependent on the specific role of the operator.

=== Vehicles ===
- Land Rover 110 4WD; utility (Truck, utility, lightweight, MC2 (soft-top)) and Fitted For Radio (Truck, utility, lightweight, FFR, MC2 (soft-top))
- Land Rover 6x6
- Mercedes Benz Unimog medium truck
- Honda XR250 motorcycle
- Polaris Industries 4WD and 6WD All Terrain Vehicles (ATVs)
- Bushmaster Protected Mobility Vehicle (RAAF Variant with 3 weapon mounts)

== See also ==
- Royal Air Force Regiment
- RNZAF Security Forces
- German Air Force Regiment
- USAF Security Forces
