= Air Training Wing RAAF =

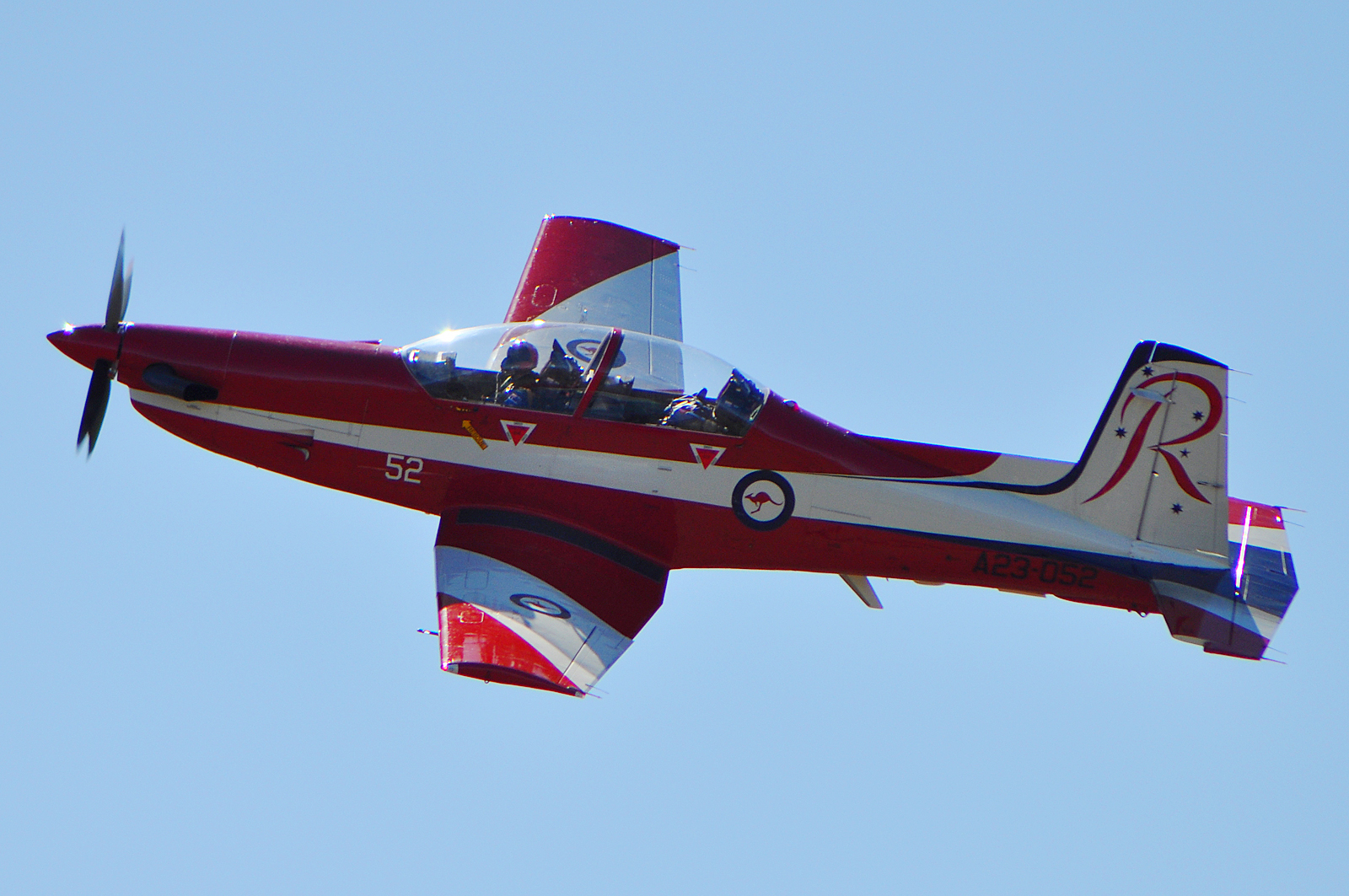
- One of the Pilatus PC-9s operated by the Central Flying School and No. 2 Flying Training School within Air Training Wing
- Country: Australia
- Role: Aircrew and instructor training
- Part of: Air Force Training Group
- Headquarters location: RAAF East Sale

Air Training Wing is the Royal Australian Air Force (RAAF) unit responsible for providing basic training for the force's pilots and aircrew, and training instructors. It also oversees the RAAF Museum.

== Structure ==
Air Training Wing forms part of the Air Force Training Group, alongside the Ground Training Wing, Reserve Training Wing, and RAAF College. Its headquarters is located at RAAF Base East Sale in Gippsland, Victoria.

As of 2015, the wing comprised the following units:

- No. 2 Flying Training School at RAAF Base Pearce, Western Australia
- No. 32 Squadron at RAAF Base East Sale
- Australian Defence Force Basic Flying Training School at Tamworth, New South Wales
- Central Flying School at RAAF Base East Sale
- Combat Survival Training School at RAAF Base Townsville
- School of Air Warfare at RAAF Base East Sale
- School of Air Traffic Control at RAAF Base East Sale
- RAAF Museum at RAAF Williams (Point Cook base)
