= Air Force Training Group RAAF =

Force element group of the Royal Australian Air Force

- Air Force Training Group's crest
- Active: 1953–1959, 1990–2006 (Training Command); 2006–current (Air Force Training Group)
- Country: Australia
- Branch: Royal Australian Air Force
- Part of: Air Command
- Garrison/HQ: RAAF Williams
- Motto: "Train to defend"

Commanders
- Current commander: Air Commodore David Strong

Air Force Training Group is the Royal Australian Air Force (RAAF) group responsible for training personnel. It is headquartered at RAAF Williams, Victoria. The group was established as Training Command in 1953. It formed part of Support Command between from 1959 to 1990, when it was re-established as Training Command. In July 2006, Training Command was re-formed as Air Force Training Group under Air Command. Air Force Training Group consists of a headquarters and two Academies: RAAF Air Academy and RAAF Ground Academy.

== Establishment and evolution ==
Air Force Training Group was established as Training Command at Albert Park, Victoria, on 1 September 1953. It was formed from Southern Area Command, which was the hub of RAAF training services at the time. Training Command merged with Maintenance Command to form Support Command on 7 September 1959. On 7 February 1990, Training Command was re-established as a discrete organisation, headquartered at RAAF Base Point Cook, Victoria. The headquarters re-located to RAAF Williams (Laverton Base) on 1 January 1999. On 1 July 2006, Training Command was re-formed as Air Force Training Group under Air Command.

== Responsibilities and bases ==
Air Force Training Group is responsible for the provision of training to members of the RAAF, as well as some personnel from the Royal Australian Navy (RAN), the Australian Army, and overseas defence forces. It also develops training policy and procedures, and supports Air Force public relations activities through the Roulettes aerobatic team, the RAAF Balloon, RAAF Museum, and the Air Force Band. Its units are located at bases in every Australian state and mainland territory.

== Structure ==
Air Force Training Group consists of a headquarters and two Academies: Air Academy and Ground Academy. These components oversee several flying units, ground schools, reserve squadrons, and the Air Force Band.

=== Commander ===
As of 16 December 2022, Air Force Training Group's commander was Air Commodore David Strong.

=== Components ===
==== Headquarters Air Force Training Group ====
Headquarters Air Force Training Group (HQ AFTG) is located at RAAF Williams (Laverton Base), Victoria. HQ AFTG is responsible for the management of RAAF training through the development of policy and plans, design and review of training programs, evaluation of relevant technology, and the issuing of awards recognising staff qualifications and achievements.

==== Air Academy ====
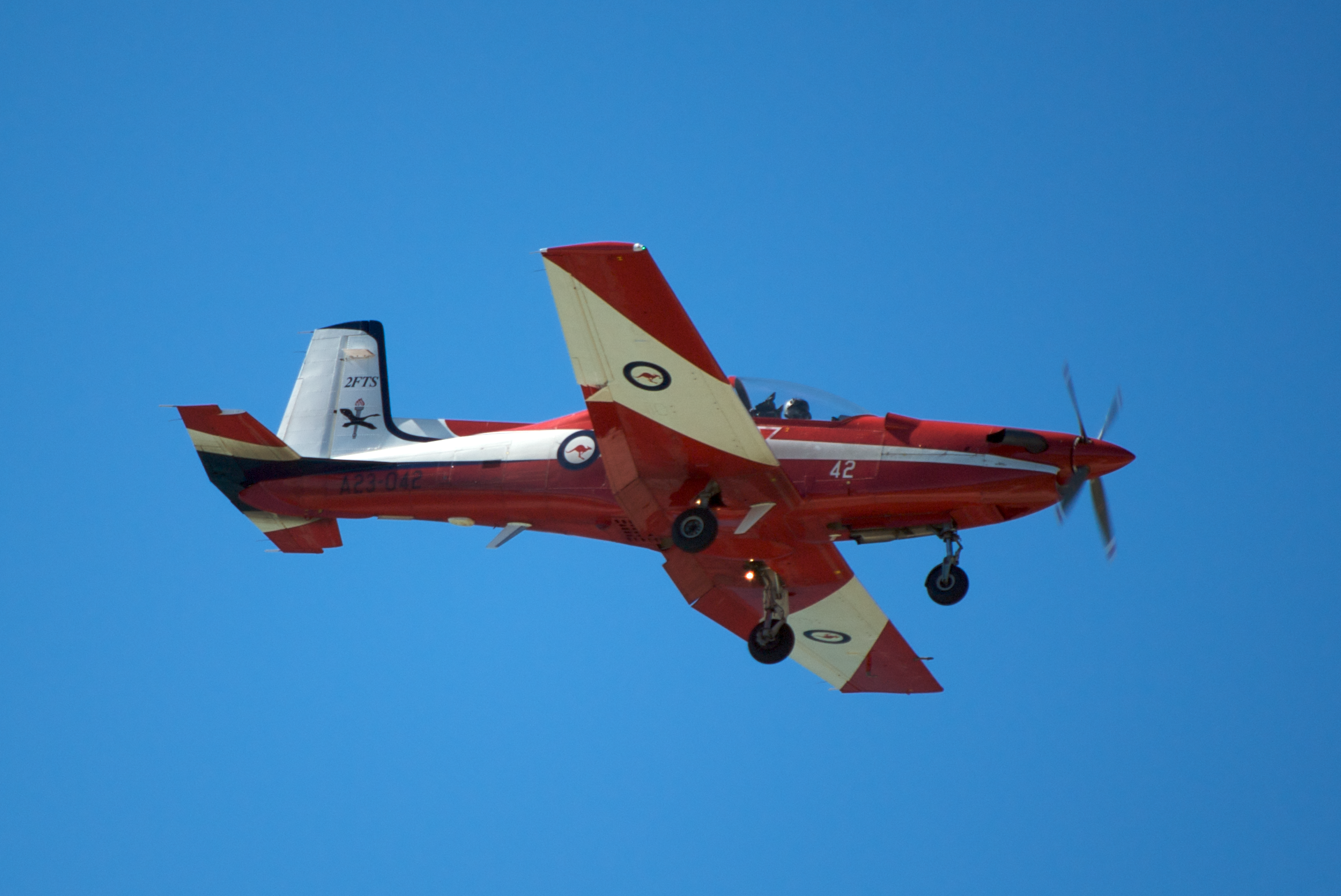
Pilatus PC-9 of No. 2 Flying Training School in 2008

Air Academy (AirA), headquartered at RAAF Base East Sale, Victoria, oversees flying instruction for RAAF and other Australian Defence Force personnel, training for air combat officers and air traffic controllers, and public flying displays. It controls several units across Australia:

- No. 1 Flying Training School at RAAF Base East Sale
- No. 2 Flying Training School at RAAF Base Pearce, Western Australia
- Central Flying School at RAAF Base East Sale
- No. 32 Squadron at RAAF Base East Sale
- No. 100 Squadron at RAAF Williams (Point Cook base) and Temora Aviation Museum
- Air Mission Training School at RAAF Base East Sale
- School of Air Traffic Control at RAAF Base East Sale
- Combat Survival Training School at RAAF Base Townsville, Queensland
- RAAF Museum at RAAF Williams (Point Cook base)
- Air Force Heritage Squadron at RAAF Williams (Point Cook base) and Temora Aviation Museum

No. 1 FTS was re-formed in January 2019 at RAAF Base East Sale to conduct basic flying training on the Pilatus PC-21. No. 2 Flying Training School is responsible for advanced flying instruction for both the RAAF and RAN, and operates Pilatus PC-21 aircraft. Central Flying School also operates PC-21s, and is responsible for training flight instructors and maintaining flying standards across the RAAF; it controls the Roulettes aerobatic team and the RAAF Balloon. No. 32 Squadron operates Beechcraft King Air B350 aircraft, which support the School of Air Warfare. RAAF Museum operates several types of heritage aircraft for flying displays.

==== Ground Academy ====
Ground Academy (GA), headquartered at RAAF Base Wagga, New South Wales, is responsible for providing technical and other non-flying training to Air Force personnel. Part of AFTG when the group was formed in 2006, Ground Training Wing merged with RAAF College on 1 January 2008, before being re-raised as a separate wing on 1 December 2009. Ground Training Wing merged with RAAF College again in late 2019 to form Ground Academy. GA controls several schools across Australia:

- No. 1 Recruit Training Unit at RAAF Base Wagga
- School of Postgraduate Studies at RAAF Base Wagga
- Officers' Training School at RAAF Base East Sale
- RAAF School of Administration and Logistics Training at RAAF Base Wagga
- RAAF School of Technical Training at RAAF Base Wagga
- Defence Explosive Ordnance Training School at Defence Establishment Orchard Hills, New South Wales
- RAAF Security and Fire School at RAAF Base Amberley, Queensland
- Air Force Band at RAAF Williams
