= Defence Establishment Orchard Hills =

Place in western Sydney, Australia

- Orchard Hills, Sydney, New South Wales in Australia

Site information
- Type: Munitions storage; Training school
- Owner: Department of Defence
- Operator: Royal Australian Air Force

Location
- Location in Greater Sydney
- Coordinates: 33°48′44″S 150°41′31″E
- Area: 1,740 hectares (4,300 acres)

Site history
- In use: 1940s – present

Garrison information
- Occupants: Defence Explosive Ordnance Training School

Defence Establishment Orchard Hills (abbreviated as DEOH) is a tri-service munitions storage base of particular importance to the Royal Australian Air Force (RAAF). Located in Orchard Hills, in the western suburbs of Sydney, New South Wales, Australia, the main role of the establishment is for storage, maintenance and distribution of Explosive Ordnance such as Bombs, Bullets, Missiles, and other military explosives. The base is also home to the RAAF-run Defence Explosive Ordnance Training School, which provides training in handling explosives to all branches of the Australian Defence Force, public servants and contractor personnel.

As well as the storage of munitions, other activities carried out on the 1,740-hectare (4,300-acre) site include the use of weapon ranges, firing ranges, fire training areas, and fuel storage and distribution from above ground and underground storage tanks. The site also contains a sewerage treatment plant, and two landfills for waste disposal from both site operations and general non-putrescible refuse, including building rubble.

Also located on site is the privately owned Thales Ordnance Training Centre, an accredited registered training organisation that provides qualifications specific to explosives, and covering the disciplines of storage, transport, manufacture and proofing of explosive ordnance.

== Environmental Offset for Western Sydney Airport ==
Defence Establishment Orchard Hills encompasses a significant area of critically endangered and protected Cumberland Plain Woodland, which is endemic to the Western Sydney region.

During siting and construction of the Western Sydney (Nancy Bird-Walton) Airport, it was announced that Defence Establishment Orchard Hills would serve as an environmental offset to compensate for destruction of the woodland associated with clearing of the airport; over 900-hectares of Defence Establishment Orchard Hills was set aside for this purpose.

=== Concerns ===
Part of the area established as the environmental offset has since been cleared to allow construction of a carpark for a new facility within the establishment.

Other groups have raised concerns that because the property is owned by the Federal Government and was already listed for protection and conservation, it does not serve as an effective offset for the new construction.

== Base Redevelopment ==
From 2019 the base saw a significant investment in infrastructure, particularly as a result of the 2020 Defence Strategic Update and Force Structure Plan. In 2019, a $95m AUD Naval Guided Weapons Maintenance Facilities Project was announced, and the facility was due to be completed by July 2021 but officially opened by the then Minister for Defence Peter Dutton on 5 April 2022.

The scope presented to the Public Works Committee in 2024 includes:

- upgrade and remediation of site infrastructure and engineering services, including potable and fire-water networks and electrical, ICT, and wastewater systems
- new and upgraded administration and working accommodation, and multi-purpose logistics facilities
- new and upgraded instructional and working facilities for the Defence Explosive Ordnance Training School
- new Living-In Accommodation
- new working accommodation for Defence and Contractor personnel currently accommodated in disaggregated facilities at DEOH and in leased accommodation in Penrith
- new and upgraded health and wellbeing facilities, including a small gymnasium and a multi-use sports court
- upgraded base entry and security, including reconfiguration of the base entry, perimeter fencing, lighting and closed circuit television
- a new multi-user Cadet facility to support existing Army and Navy Cadet Units displaced by other work elements, and to relocate an existing Air Force Cadet Unit from off-base to on-base
- demolition of surplus/obsolete facilities that have reached their end-of-life.

The project is valued at $AUD359.3 million with construction expected to commence in 2025.

== See also ==
- List of Royal Australian Air Force installations
