= Dutson Bombing Range =

- Near Sale, Victoria in Australia

Site information
- Type: Bombing range
- Owner: Department of Defence
- Operator: Royal Australian Air Force

Location
- Location in Victoria
- Coordinates: 38.181667°S 147.269444°E

Dutson Bombing Range is a bombing range operated by the Royal Australian Air Force (RAAF), located near the town of Sale and RAAF Base East Sale in Victoria.

On 15 August 1962, four Vampire aircraft of the Red Sales display team crashed in the vicinity of the range while doing aerobatics practice. All six men aboard the aircraft were killed instantly.

The site ceased to be used as an active bombing range in 2000.

It has been used as a live firing site for the Australian Army as late as 2010.

In 2018, it was announced that the company DefendTex would construct a facility to manufacture and test propellants and explosives at the range.

== See also ==
- List of Royal Australian Air Force installations
