= No. 27 Squadron RAAF =

Royal Australian Air Force squadron

- Active: 1981–current
- Country: Australia
- Branch: Royal Australian Air Force
- Role: Air base support, reserve recruitment and training
- Base: RAAF Base Townsville
- Motto(s): "In Readiness"

No. 27 (City of Townsville) Squadron is a Royal Australian Air Force (RAAF) reserve and ground support squadron located at RAAF Base Townsville, Queensland. The squadron was formed on 1 July 1981 to recruit and train RAAF reservists in the Townsville area and in July 2010 took on the additional role of providing support services to RAAF Base Townsville.

== Squadron history ==
No. 27 Squadron was formed at RAAF Base Townsville on 1 July 1981, initially as an Auxiliary unit of the Citizen Air Force before being redesignated as an Active Reserve squadron. Upon establishment, the unit had a strength of three Permanent Air Force personnel tasked with recruiting RAAF reservists. During its first year 60 reservists joined the squadron and it eventually reached a strength of over 100 permanent and reserve personnel. The squadron received its crest in 1988 and in 1991 was granted the Freedom of the City of Townsville. In May 1988, the squadron began operating the RAAF Townsville Museum. During its period as a reserve squadron its personnel worked alongside members of the Permanent Air Force during exercises, operations and day-to-day activities. These duties included a focus on maintaining RAAF aircraft based at Townsville and the squadron also maintained a radio network to support participants in the RAAF's Combat Survival Training School.

On 1 July 2010, No. 27 Squadron's role expanded to include the provision of support services to RAAF Base Townsville when it was merged with No. 323 Expeditionary Combat Support Squadron. This formed part of a reform across the RAAF in which the reserve squadrons were merged with local combat support units or expeditionary combat support squadrons with the goal of improving the provision of air base support services. Under the new arrangements the commander of No. 27 Squadron has also received the responsibilities of the senior Australian Defence Force officer at RAAF Base Townsville.

The squadron forms part of No. 96 Wing.
