= Officers' Training School RAAF =

RAAF Officer Training School
- RAAF Officer Training School emblem
- Active: 1950–present
- Branch: Royal Australian Air Force
- Part of: Air Force Training Group; RAAF College
- Garrison/HQ: RAAF Base East Sale
- Motto: Accept Responsibility

Commanders
- Notable commanders: William Brill (1953–56)

Officers' Training School (OTS) is the unit responsible for preparing recruits, senior airmen and Warrant Officers for careers as commissioned officers in the Royal Australian Air Force (RAAF). Between 200 and 300 students graduate from the School each year, which is located at RAAF Base East Sale, Victoria.

== History ==
Officers' Training School was formed at RAAF Base Rathmines, New South Wales, on 12 April 1950. It was reformed in 1956 as Officers Training Squadron. In 1961, following the closure of the base at Rathmines, the Squadron relocated to RAAF Base Point Cook, Victoria, under its original name of Officers' Training School. In 1986, OTS was absorbed into RAAF College. It was re-established as a separate unit in 1998 under RAAF Training Command, which was reorganised as Air Force Training Group in 2006. In January 2008 the first course commenced at the School's new location at RAAF Base East Sale.
