= RAAF Base East Sale =

Airport in Victoria, Australia

- Sale, Victoria in Australia
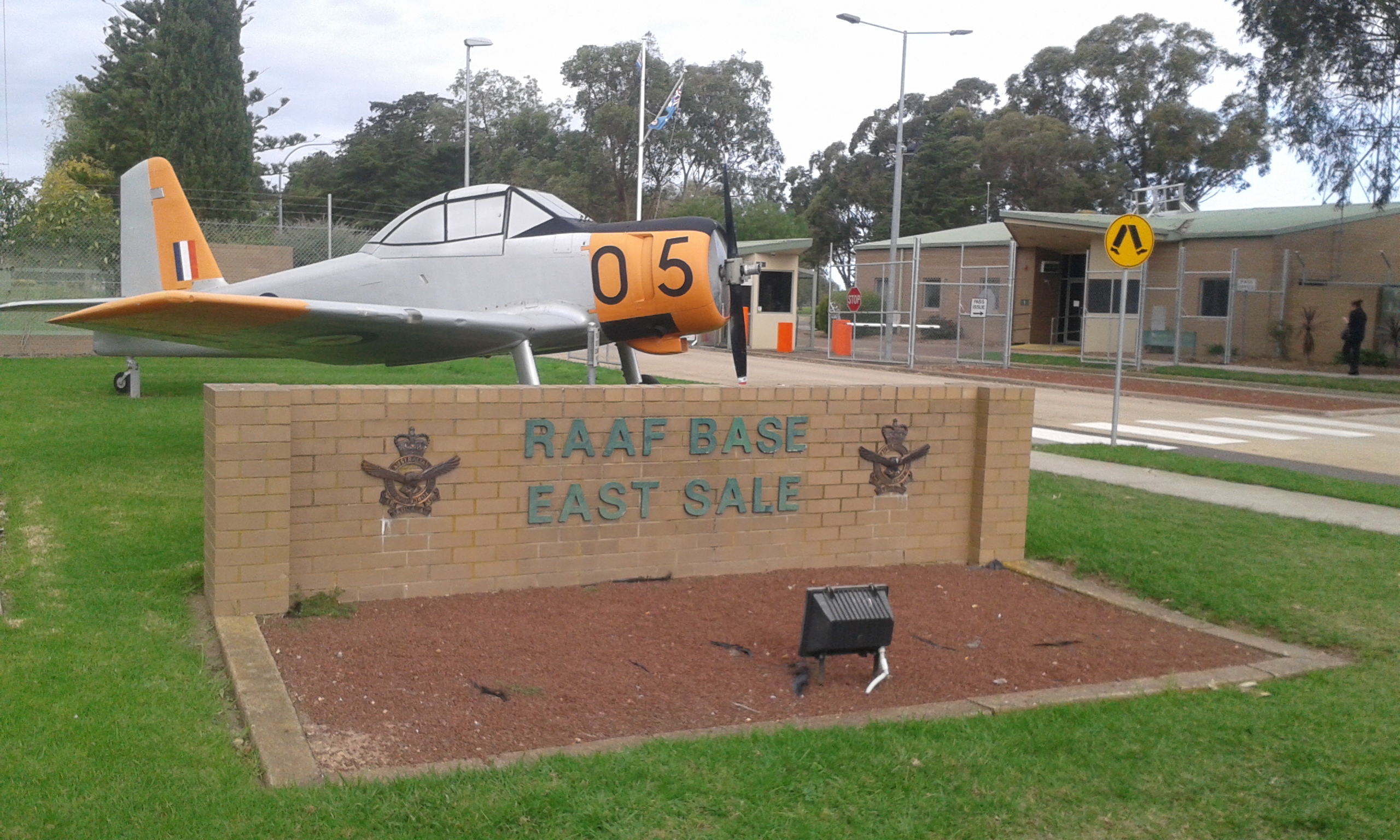
- RAAF Base East Sale Winjeel Gate Guardian, 2016

Site information
- Type: Military airfield and training school
- Owner: Department of Defence
- Operator: Royal Australian Air Force
- Website: RAAF Base East Sale

Location
- Location in Victoria
- Coordinates: 38°05′56″S 147°08′58″E

Site history
- In use: 22 April 1943 – present

Garrison information
- Occupants: Headquarters Air Training Wing; Officers' Training School RAAF; No 453 East Sale Flight; No. 32 Squadron; No. 30 (City of Sale) Squadron; Central Flying School, incorporating the Roulettes; School of Air Traffic Control; No.1 Flying Training School; No.2 Flying Training School; Aviation Candidate Management Centre; Training Aircraft Systems Program Office; No 1 Expeditionary Health Squadron Detachment; 4/19th Prince of Wales's Light Horse Regiment; Defence Support and Reform Group; No. 409 Squadron Australian Air Force Cadets

Airfield information
- Identifiers: ICAO: YMES
- Elevation: 7 metres (23 ft) AMSL
Runways
Direction	Length and surface
04/22	2,437 metres (7,995 ft) Asphalt
09/27	2,230 metres (7,316 ft) Asphalt
- Sources: Australian AIP and aerodrome chart

RAAF Base East Sale (ICAO: YMES) is a Royal Australian Air Force (RAAF) military air base and training school, located in Sale, Victoria, Australia. The base is one of the main training establishments of the RAAF, and is where Australian Air Force Cadets from 4 Wing (Victoria) have their biannual General Service Training.

It is the home of the RAAF's Officers' Training School (OTS) following its relocation from RAAF Base Point Cook, the Air Mission Training School (AMTS), and the School of Air Traffic Control. East Sale was upgraded to house the new OTS, which had its first intake of students in January 2008. The base houses approximately 700 air force personnel. As well as being home to No. 409 Squadron Australian Air Force Cadets, it is home to the Roulettes aerobatic display team.

== History ==
RAAF Base East Sale opened as a training base on 22 April 1943. Initially, the base was home to No.1 Operational Training Unit (1 OTU), equipped with Bristol Beaufort light bomber aircraft, relocated from airfields at West Sale and Bairnsdale. The base was primarily responsible for training air crew, but units from East Sale also operated in some convoy protection and maritime surveillance roles.

Over 3,000 aircrew were trained at the base between its opening and the end of World War II. In addition to the Beauforts, a variety of aircraft types were operated from the base during that time, including the Lockheed Hudson on which future Prime Minister of Australia Gough Whitlam undertook training as a navigator. Other types used by 1 OTU included Airspeed Oxfords and Fairey Battles.

In 1947, the RAAF Central Flying School was relocated from RAAF Base Point Cook to East Sale . By 1953, the school had received its first De Havilland Vampire jet aircraft. In 1962, four Vampire jets from CFS at East Sale formed "The Red Sales" aerobatic display team. However while practising aerobatic routines on 15 August, all four Red Sales crashed in formation after failing to recover from a manoeuvre, killing six Central Flying School staff. Six months later, a second display team, "The Telstars", was formed, also flying Vampires and later Aermacchi MB-326 (Macchi) jets. The display team was disbanded in May 1968, due to budget constraints and a shortage of available Macchi airframes. In 1970, to celebrate the 50th anniversary of the Royal Australian Air Force, the current Roulettes aerobatic display team was formed, initially operating Macchi MB-326s.

On 24 November 1987, the first two of 67 Pilatus PC-9/A aircraft for the RAAF arrived at East Sale. It would become the primary aircraft used by the Central Flying School until 12 December 2019.

On 1 July 1989, 32 Squadron – formerly a bomber and reconnaissance unit during World War II – was reactivated at East Sale and equipped with Hawker Siddeley HS 748s. Those aircraft were operated on general transport and training duties, including RAAF Navigator and Airborne Electronics Analyst training, as well as Royal Australian Navy Observer training. By June 2004, the squadron had completed conversion to new Beechcraft King Air 350 equipment.

In 1992, the RAAF restructured its flight training programs, handing responsibility for ab-initio training and screening to civilian contractors and retiring its fleet of CT-4 aircraft. The successful bidder to operate the Basic Flight Training School was the Ansett/BAe Systems Flight Training College at Tamworth in New South Wales, using new-build and ex-Australian and New Zealand Air Force CT-4s. Central Flying School operates four BAE-owned CT-4s for training military flight instructors.

In 2000, the nearby Dutson Bombing Range ceased to be used for bombing practice.

In 2015, the RAAF announced that Basic Flight Training would be returning to East Sale in 2019, with Lockheed Martin selected to provide support for the new program using Pilatus PC-21 aircraft, replacing the current PC-9/A fleet. Until that time, BAE continued to provide support to the existing training program in Tamworth.

On 21 July 2016, the first RAAF Pilatus PC-21 flew at Stans, Switzerland.

In August 2017, 6 PC-21 aircraft arrived at East Sale. The last of 49 PC-21 aircraft were delivered at East Sale in December 2019, and are utilised as the RAAF's basic and advanced trainer aircraft.

Today it remains the RAAF's primary training base, operating continuously in a training role since 1943. Near the entrance to the base are static, historic aircraft displays of a CAC CA-25 Winjeel, Aermacchi MB-326H and Pilatus PC-9/A, as well as a former operations facility visible, and current and historical informative display boards.

During the 2019–2020 Australian bushfire season, the base was being used to assist with firefighting and relief operations. Many aircraft deployed to the base, including Australian Army S-70 Blackhawk, MRH-90 Taipan and CH-47 Chinook helicopters, RSAF CH-47s, New Zealand NH-90s and RAAF C-27J Spartans.

During 2024, the No. 2 Flying Training School course commenced operating out of East Sale, alongside RAAF Base Pearce.

== Units ==
Unit name	Force Element Group	Aircraft
No. 44 Wing Detachment East Sale	Surveillance and Response Group	
No. 32 Squadron	Air Force Training Group	King Air 350
Headquarters Air Training Wing	Air Force Training Group	
Air Mission Training School	Air Force Training Group	
Central Flying School	Air Force Training Group	Pilatus PC-21
No. 30 (City of Sale) Squadron	Combat Support Group	
Officers' Training School	Air Force Training Group	
No. 1 Flying Training School	Air Force Training Group	Pilatus PC-21
No. 2 Flying Training School	Air Force Training Group	Pilatus PC-21
School of Air Traffic Control	Air Force Training Group	
No. 409 Squadron Australian Air Force Cadets	Australian Air Force Cadets	
Training Aircraft Systems Program Office	Capability Acquisition and Sustainment Group	

== Accidents and incidents ==
On 27 December 1943, Fairey Battle L5789 of Air Gunnery School West Sale, piloted by Flight Sergeant Lindsay Pynor White, was involved in some air-to-air gunnery drogue training. The aircraft was flying low along the Seaspray Beach section of Ninety Mile Beach, with the target drogue attached, when the drogue hit a fisherman's rod which was implanted in the sand. The drogue and lead weight became detached from the drogue cable. The Fairey Battle then proceeded along the beach some 400 yards with the cable snaking along the sand. The cable struck and injured a number of civilians on the beach at Seaspray.

The injured civilians were: 16 year old Miss Noreen Cullen of Sale had both feet severed above the ankles. Sixty year old Hector Ernest Luxford of Sale had his right foot above the ankle and his left foot severely gashed and practically severed. Miss Annette Plant of Sale received an injured left leg. Miss Doreen McFadyen of Sale received an injured left toe. 13 year old Percy Orchard of Sale received injuries to his hand and cuts and abrasions to his legs. Mr. Rowland care of Leslies, Sale, suffered slight abrasions to his left leg.

Noreen Cullen and Hector Luxford were taken to Nicholls Cottage at Seaspray, waiting the completion of Blood Serum transfusion before their transfer to the Gippsland District Hospital for further blood transfusions and admission.

In 1962, four Vampire jets from CFS at East Sale formed "The Red Sales" aerobatic display team. However while practising aerobatic routines on 15 August, all four Red Sales crashed in formation after failing to recover from a manoeuvre, killing six Central Flying School staff.

On 29 October 1991, a Boeing 707 of No. 33 Squadron crashed into the sea 43 km (27 mi) south of RAAF Base East Sale while on a training flight. The aircraft stalled after an asymmetric flight condition was mishandled, causing an unrecoverable loss of control. All five RAAF crew were killed in the accident.

== See also ==
- List of airports in Victoria
- List of Royal Australian Air Force installations
