= No. 32 Squadron RAAF =

Royal Australian Air Force squadron

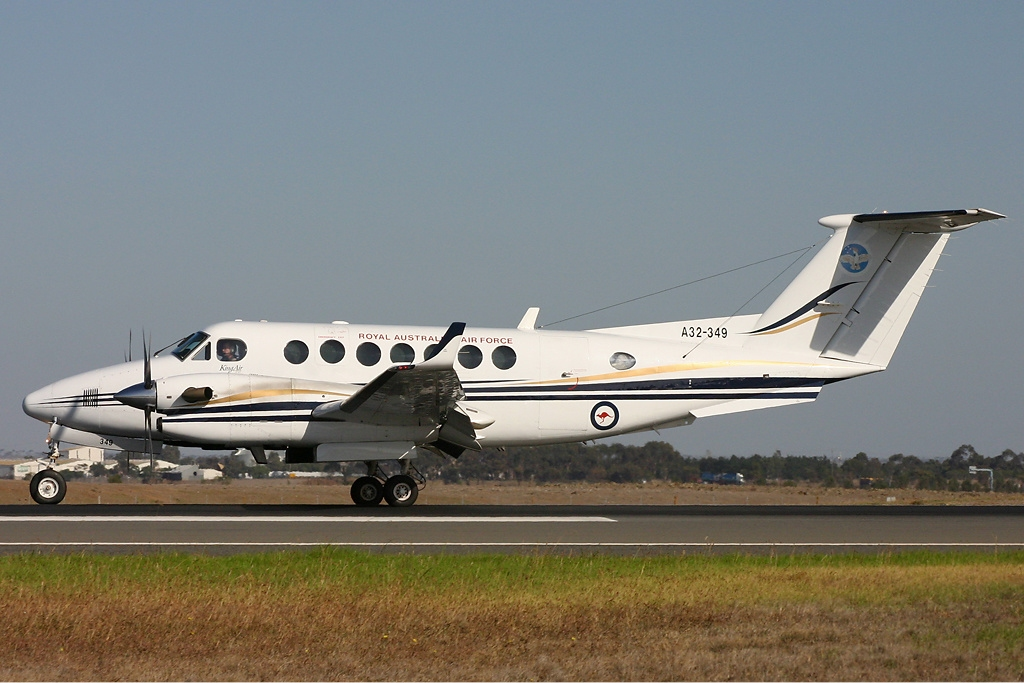
- No. 32 Squadron Beechcraft King Air 350 A32-348
- Active: February 1942 – November 1945; July 1989 – current
- Branch: Royal Australian Air Force
- Role: Training and light transport
- Part of: Air Training Wing
- Garrison/HQ: RAAF Base East Sale
- Motto: Adaptable
- Aircraft: King Air 350

Commanders
- Notable commanders: Deryck Kingwell (1942); John Lerew (1942)

No. 32 Squadron is a Royal Australian Air Force unit based at RAAF East Sale in Victoria. It currently flies training and transport operations. The squadron was raised in February 1942 for service during World War II. Equipped with Lockheed Hudsons, the squadron was tasked with anti-submarine, anti-shipping operations, bombing and reconnaissance missions in New Guinea. In late 1942, it was withdrawn to Sydney and re-equipped with Bristol Beauforts, which it operated along the east coast of Australia until the war ended. The squadron was disbanded in November 1945, but was re-formed in 1989 with Hawker Siddeley HS 748s. It currently operates Beechcraft King Air 350s.

== History ==
=== World War II ===
The squadron was established as a reconnaissance and bomber unit, equipped with Lockheed Hudson aircraft, at Port Moresby on 21 February 1942. It was formed from elements of other RAAF Hudson squadrons deployed from their home bases for combat operations against Japanese forces. No. 32 Squadron played an important role during the early stages of the New Guinea campaign, conducting anti-submarine and anti-shipping patrols, flying bombing sorties against enemy airfields and flying boat bases, as well as conducting reconnaissance and supply missions.

No. 32 Squadron's first mission took place the day it was formed, when aircraft were launched to search for a reported enemy submarine. A few days later, the squadron undertook the first of many bombing raids on the Japanese air base at Gasmata. After only a few weeks of operations, due to enemy raids on Port Moresby's Seven Mile airfield, the squadron was withdrawn to Horn Island, Queensland, but continued to stage out of Seven Mile on its missions, its aircraft refuelling there en route to their targets. In March 1942, one of the squadron's Hudsons was the first to spot the Japanese convoy transporting the forces for the invasion of the New Guinea mainland. Later the same month, the squadron engaged Japanese forces landing at Lae and Salamaua. In July 1942, No. 32 Squadron was active in the Gona area and during the lead-up to the Battle of Milne Bay.

The skill and fighting spirit of a lone, outnumbered crew from No. 32 Squadron impressed Saburō Sakai, who would become among the highest-scoring Japanese aces of the war. Pilot Officer Warren Cowan, Pilot Officer David Taylor, Sergeant Russell Polack and Sergeant Lauri Sheard, in Hudson Mk IIIA A16–201 (bu. no. 41-36979), were killed in action after being shot down by Sakai on 22 July 1942. A16–201 was intercepted over Buna, New Guinea by nine Mitsubishi A6M "Zeroes" of the Tainan Kaigun Kōkūtai, led by Sakai. The Hudson's crew surprised the Zero pilots by taking the initiative in a turning dogfight and were apparently unscathed for at least 10 minutes. Sakai observed that after he killed or wounded the Hudson's rear/upper gunner, the pilot became less able to evade his rounds. The Hudson caught fire and crashed in jungle near the coastal village of Popogo. So impressed were the Japanese pilots by their opponents that, many years after the war's end, Sakai asked Australian researchers to help him identify the pilot. In 1997, Sakai took the unusual step of writing to the Australian government, recommending that Cowan be "posthumously awarded your country's highest military decoration". The suggestion was rejected on the grounds that all such recommendations had been closed at the war's end.

Redeployed to Sydney in September 1942, No. 32 Squadron conducted anti-submarine patrols, initially from RAAF Base Richmond and then from Camden. In March 1943, the Hudsons were replaced by DAP-built versions of the Bristol Beaufort, which it used until the end of the war. On 17 June 1943 three Bristol Beauforts from No. 32 Squadron RAAF attacked a Japanese submarine—possibly I-178—off Coffs Harbour, and may have sunk it. The squadron was disbanded in November 1945.

=== Reactivation ===
No. 32 Squadron was reformed on 1 July 1989 at RAAF Base East Sale as a training and transport squadron equipped with Hawker Siddeley HS 748 aircraft. In 1997, leased Beechcraft B200 Super King Airs joined the squadron, although it continued to operate some of the HS 748s as well. No. 32 Squadron was re-equipped with leased Beechcraft King Air 350 aircraft commencing in 2003 and the remaining HS 748s were retired on 30 June 2004. There are eight King Air 350s in service.

The King Air 350s have been heavily modified and are used in three main roles: for Air Combat Officer and Maritime Aviation Warfare Officer; for low-level tactical and maritime operations training under the auspices of the School of Aviation Warfare; and as light transport aircraft. Typical low-level training missions are conducted at 200 to 500 feet (61 to 153 metres) above sea or ground level, while transport missions may be undertaken at altitudes as high as 35,000 ft (10,675 m). The current squadron motif is a sulphur-crested cockatoo with the Southern Cross depicted on a blue background.

In May 2018, a King Air belonging to No. 32 Squadron deployed to the South Pacific for a two week rotation as part of the RAAF's support to Operation Solania. The operation is focused upon detecting illegal fishing and policing economic exclusion zones, and involves air and naval forces from Australia, New Zealand, the United States and France.

== Aircraft operated ==
- Lockheed Hudson February 1942 – March 1943
- DAP Beaufort March 1943 – November 1945
- Hawker Siddeley HS 748 July 1989 – June 2004
- Beechcraft B200 Super King Air June 1997 – March 2003
- Beechcraft B300 King Air 350 April 2003 – current
