= RAAF Museum =

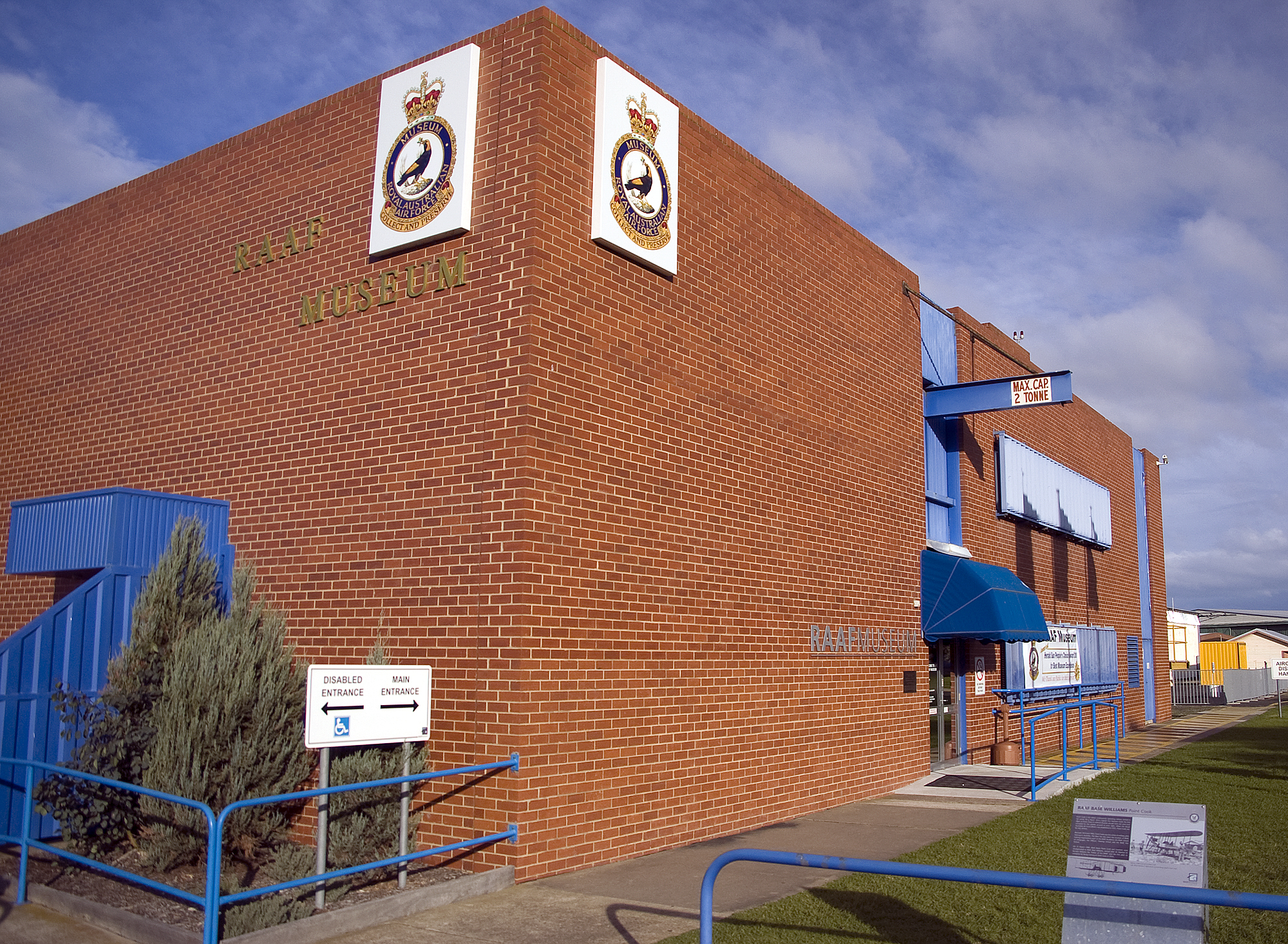
- Museum building

- Location within Victoria
- Established: 1952
- Location: RAAF Williams Point Cook
- Coordinates: 37.930464°S 144.749073°E
- Type: Military museum
- Founder: Air Marshal Sir George Jones
- Director: David Gardner
- Website: https://www.airforce.gov.au/community/visit-and-learn/raaf-museum

RAAF Museum is the official museum of the Royal Australian Air Force located at RAAF Williams Point Cook, Victoria, Australia. The museum displays aircraft of significance to the RAAF from its inception as the Australian Flying Corps to the present.

== History ==
At the direction of Air Marshal Sir George Jones, the RAAF Museum was formed in 1952 and fell under the administration of Headquarters Point Cook until 1988 when it became a separate unit of the RAAF. It is currently overseen by the force's Air Training Wing.

== Collection ==
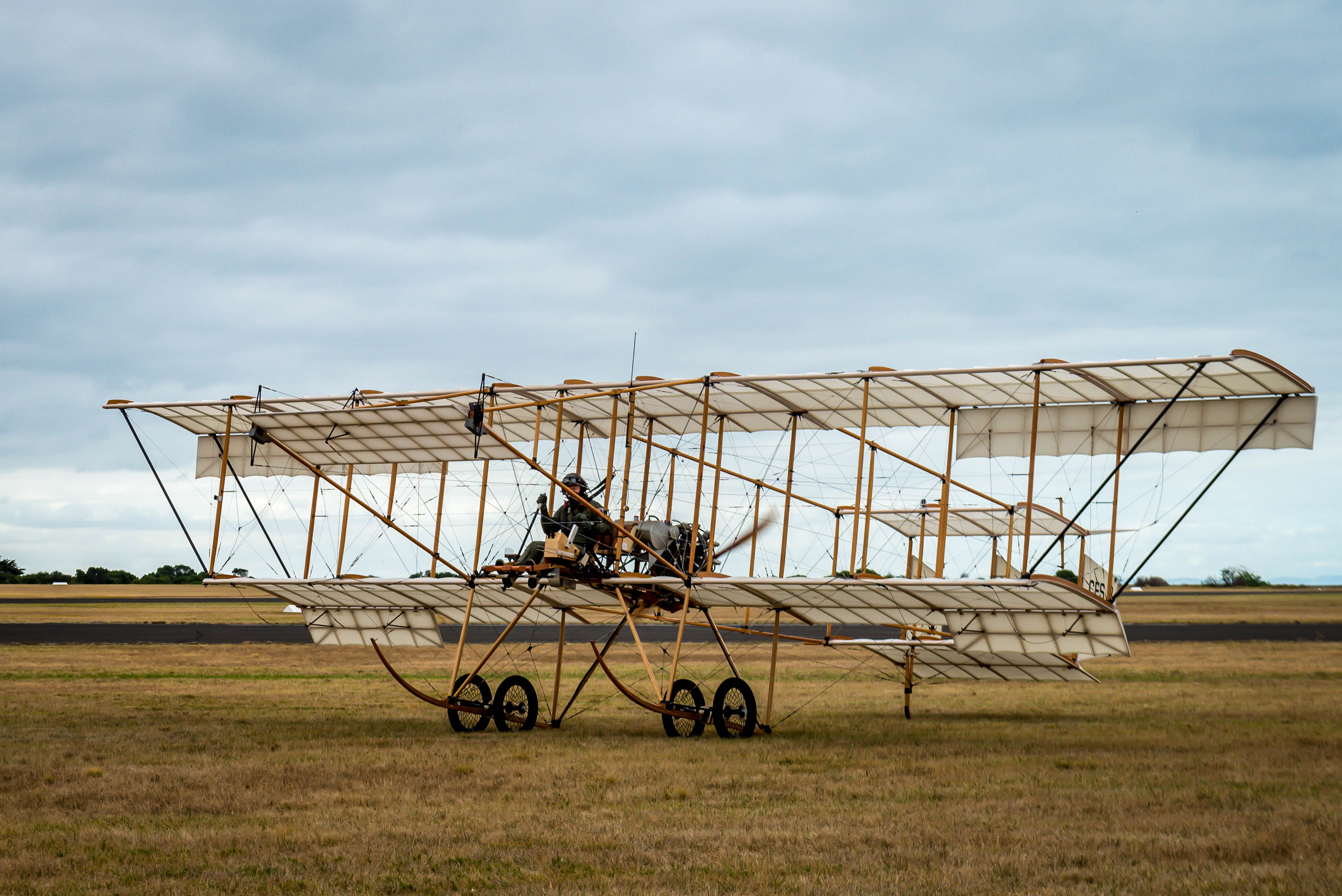
A Bristol Boxkite replica at the Centenary of Military Aviation

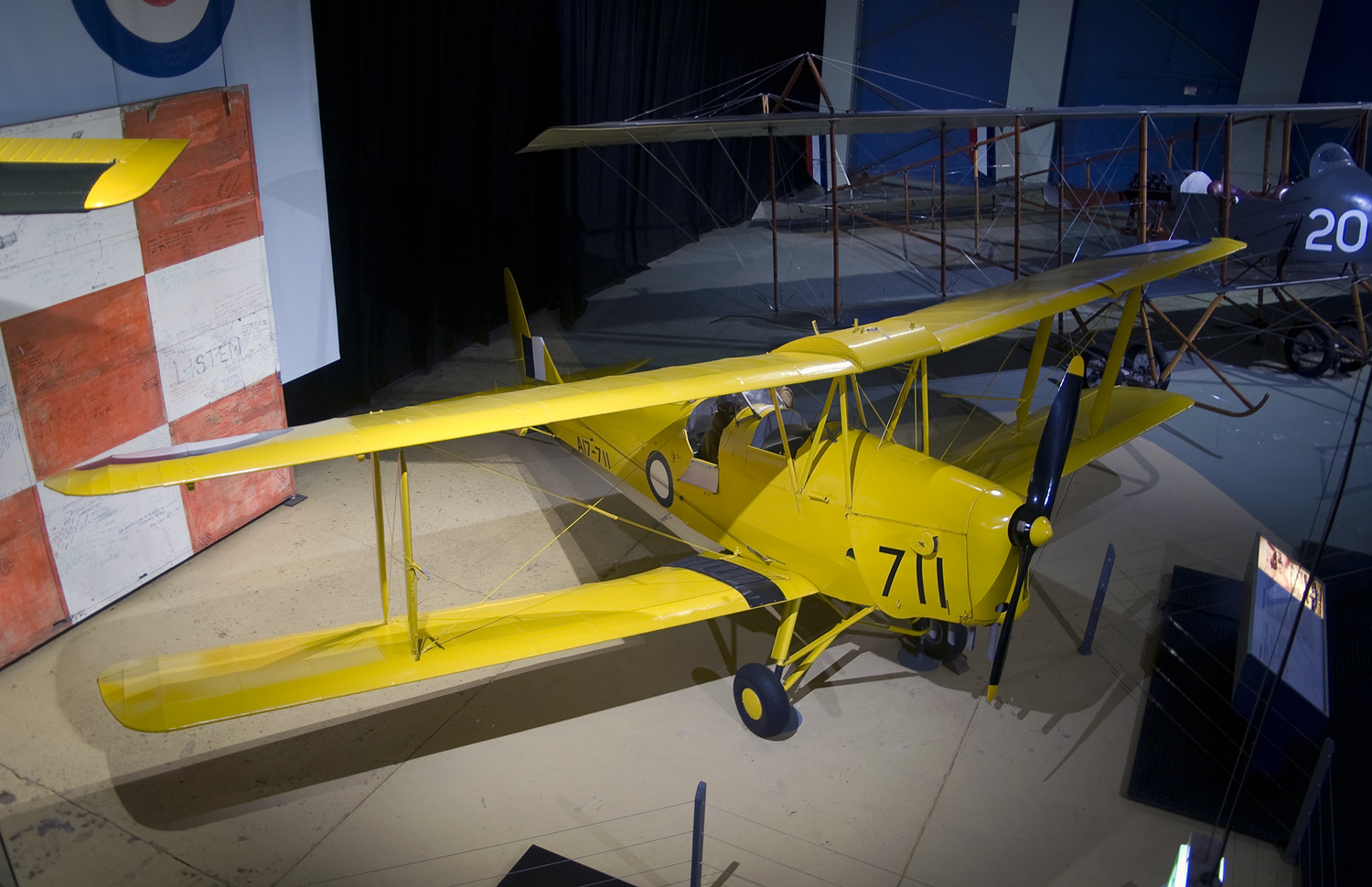
de Havilland Tiger Moth (A17-711)

=== Static display ===
==== Aircraft ====
- Aermacchi MB-326H
- Avro 504K
- Avro 643 Cadet
- Bell UH-1B Iroquois
- Bell UH-1B Iroquois
- Bristol Boxkite – replica
- Bristol Freighter
- CAC Boomerang
- CAC Sabre
- CAC Winjeel
- Cessna O-1 Bird Dog
- Dassault Mirage III
- de Havilland DH.84 Dragon
- de Havilland Tiger Moth
- de Havilland Vampire F.30
- de Havilland Vampire T.35
- de Havilland Canada DHC-4 Caribou
- Deperdussin 1910 monoplane – replica
- Douglas Boston
- Farman MF.11 Shorthorn
- GAF Canberra
- GAF Jindivik
- GAF Pika
- General Dynamics F-111G
- Hawker Demon
- Hawker Siddeley HS 748
- Lockheed C-130E Hercules
- Lockheed C-130H Hercules
- Lockheed P-3C Orion
- McDonnell Douglas F/A-18A Hornet
- McDonnell Douglas F-4E Phantom
- Pacific Aerospace Corporation CT/4A
- Royal Aircraft Factory B.E.2 – replica
- Royal Aircraft Factory S.E.5
- Sikorsky S-51
- Supermarine Walrus
- Vickers PBV-1A Canso

==== Missiles ====
- Bristol Bloodhound
- Bristol Bloodhound

=== Aircraft in storage ===
- Avro 707A
- CAC Winjeel
- CAC Wirraway
- de Havilland Mosquito
- de Havilland Vampire T.35
- Douglas C-47 Dakota
- General Dynamics F-111C
- Gloster Meteor F.8
- Gloster Meteor T.7
- Lockheed SP-2H Neptune
- Lockheed Ventura
- North American Harvard IIA

=== Flying display ===
The Air Force Heritage Squadron, No. 100 Squadron, operates Air Force’s fleet of heritage aircraft out of two locations: RAAF Base Point Cook and Temora Aviation Museum.

== See also ==
- Aviation Heritage Museum (Western Australia)
- Fighter World
- RAAF Wagga Heritage Centre
- List of aerospace museums
