= RAAF Base Townsville =

Royal Australian Air Force base in Townsville, Australia

- Townsville, Queensland in Australia
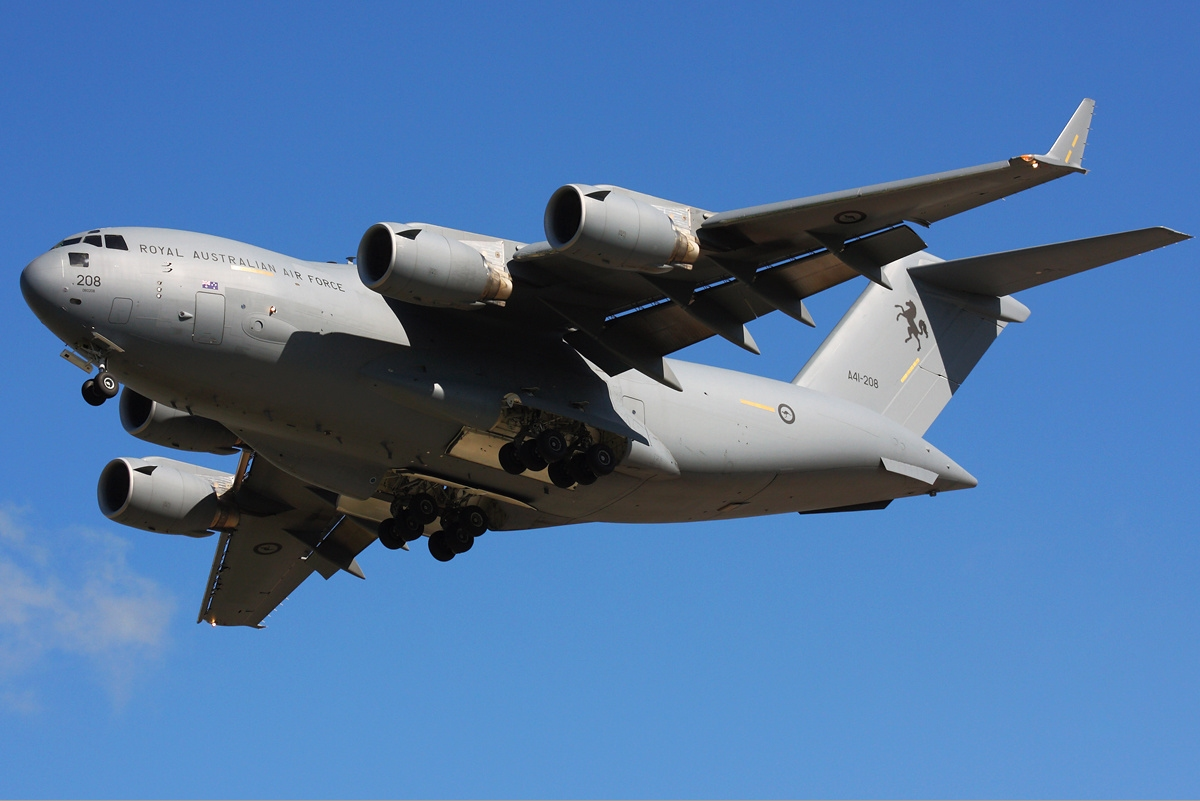
- RAAF Boeing C-17 Globemaster III at Townsville airport in 2010.

Site information
- Type: Military air base
- Owner: Department of Defence
- Operator: Royal Australian Air Force
- Website: RAAF Base Townsville

Location
- Location of the base in Queensland
- Coordinates: 19°15′12″S 146°45′54″E
- Area: 900 hectares (2,200 acres)

Site history
- In use: 15 October 1940 – present

Garrison information
- Occupants: No. 383 Squadron; No. 452 Squadron Townsville Flight; No. 27 (City of Townsville) Squadron; Combat Survival Training School; Army's No. 5 Aviation Regiment; 1 Expeditionary Health Squadron Detachment Townsville; No 2 Security Squadron detachment Townsville

Airfield information
- Identifiers: IATA: TSV, ICAO: YBTL
- Elevation: 5 metres (18 ft) AMSL
Runways
| Direction | Length and surface |
|---|---|
| 01/19 | 2,438 metres (7,999 ft) Asphalt |
| 07/25 | 1,100 metres (3,609 ft) Asphalt |
- Source: Enroute Supplement Australia from Airservices Australia

RAAF Base Townsville (IATA: TSV, ICAO: YBTL) (formerly RAAF Base Garbutt) is a Royal Australian Air Force (RAAF) air base located in Garbutt, 2 nautical miles (3.7 km; 2.3 mi) west of Townsville in Queensland, Australia. It is the headquarters for No. 1 Wing Australian Air Force Cadets and, along with Lavarack Barracks, establishes Townsville as a key military centre. The base uses the Townsville Airport.

== Arms ==
The RAAF Base Townsville symbol is that of a brolga, superimposed upon a castle; surrounded by the words Royal Australian Air Force; surmounted by a crown; with the motto "Guarding the North" on parchment below it.

== History ==
An airport on the location now known as RAAF Base Townsville was first established in the late 1930s for civil aviation, and was then further developed as part of Australia's military preparations for the coming war. Plans were being drawn up for the RAAF base well before the commencement of hostilities in Europe, and the field was fully operational with a squadron of fighter aircraft in service fourteen months before Japan entered the war. The base still functions with many of its early buildings performing their original purpose nearly 70 years after their plans were first drawn up.

=== Early use of the land ===
The municipality of Townsville was created in 1866, but it took in only a small area encircling Castle Hill. The land which now comprises RAAF Base Townsville became part of the new Thuringowa Division (later Shire) in 1879, and was first surveyed in an extension of the Townsville urban survey in 1884. In 1918 the local government boundary changed, and the land was incorporated into the City of Townsville.

The RAAF site was never privately owned, but remained vacant Crown land until taken up by the Commonwealth in 1940. The site was considered too low-lying and swampy for residential or other development, and was proposed in 1868 to be set aside as Town Common under the trusteeship of Townsville City Council for public grazing. Local people cut firewood in the scrub. As late as 1939 when the RAAF first investigated acquiring the site, much of the land was still thick forest.

=== Civil aviation ===
The beginning of aviation on the land was also an initiative of Townsville City Council. The first airfield established in Townsville was an east–west strip in the Thuringowa Shire, on the floodplain south of the Ross River in what is now the Townsville suburb of Murray. In use from the 1920s, it was licensed by the Department of Civil Aviation in 1930. The Garbutt site was adopted a few years later because it was better drained than the Ross River site, and it provided space for runways orientated into the prevailing winds to the north-east and south-east. Townsville City Council carried out construction work on two 730-metre (800 yd) gravel runways on the new site, and the new airport was licensed on 26 January 1939. Civil aviation operations commenced on 1 February when a Stinson airliner of Airlines of Australia landed in front of a mayoral reception, although there were as yet no hangars or fuelling facilities, and not even a formed road to the airfield.

=== RAAF Base Townsville ===
Almost immediately, there were moves to base military aircraft on the site. In 1938, the Department of Defence, realising the likelihood of war between Japan and the US, had begun planning to improve Queensland's northern defences, and in late January 1939 while the runways were under construction an RAAF officer was sent to Townsville to select the best site for a military airfield. The proposal to establish an air force base at Townsville arose as part of a general move in 1938–39 to improve defence preparedness by establishing or upgrading military establishments across northern Australia, particularly at Darwin and Townsville. The principal function of the base was to provide for the fighter defence of Townsville, and an early plan of the base layout shows three hangars, apparently to house three fighter squadrons. This was revised by late 1939, and scaled back to a one squadron base, staffed by 140 Citizen Air Force and 132 RAAF personnel. This was a substantial base for the time, with an establishment of nearly 10% of the RAAF's total strength. Darwin was planned to be about twice that size.

The Commonwealth approached Townsville City Council to negotiate for the acquisition of the new airport land in April 1939. Defence had hoped the State would donate the land, but negotiations with the State and Council over the purchase price and compensation for improvements dragged on for some time, and the land was compulsorily acquired by the Commonwealth in December 1940 in exchange for a payment of £2,500 to the Queensland Government. The Commonwealth entered into an agreement with Townsville City Council whereby Council would supply water, sewerage and electricity to the base. Under the agreement between Commonwealth and Council, civil aviation activities were to continue on the site.

=== War in Europe ===
The impact of World War II on Australia occurred in two phases. Australia was automatically drawn into the war against Germany in September 1939 as the dominion's foreign policy was dictated by Britain's, and for the next two years Australian forces fought in the European Theatre, and the Mediterranean and Middle East Theatre in circumstances very similar to those of World War I. It was during this phase that RAAF Townsville was constructed.

Plans for the buildings at RAAF Townsville were drawn up by the Chief Architects Office of the Department of Works during the second half of 1939. The hangars and workshops were to be welded steel-framed buildings, based on contemporary RAF designs for fighter airfields. In early 1940, while the land negotiations were still proceeding, construction commenced on two gravelled runways, hangars, workshops, accommodation blocks and messes. Construction of the runways and basic facilities was completed before the end of 1940. The base was officially formed on 15 October 1940, when the Townsville Daily Bulletin described the excitement in Townsville the previous day when an advance party of RAAF personnel arrived by train, and marched down Flinders Street, led by the municipal brass band.: "The main body of the Royal Australian Air Force squadron to be based on the Townsville aerodrome at Garbutt, arrived on Monday morning, and are now quartered in the fine new buildings on the aerodrome site." The Battle of Britain was still winding down, and for months the news had been full of the exploits of fighter pilots.

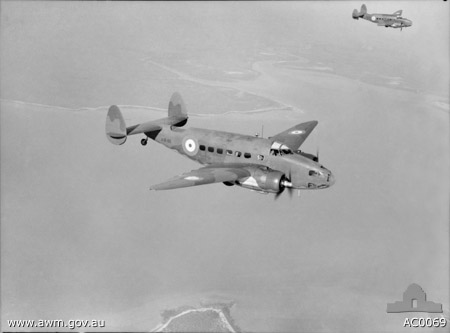
Two Australian Lockheed Hudsons in 1940

Within the next few days the CA-25 Wirraway fighters of No.24 Squadron were flown in to the Townsville field, and later supplemented by Hudson light bomber and reconnaissance aircraft. Newly built at the Commonwealth Aircraft Corporation's Maribyrnong factory, the Wirraways were the state of the art in the RAAF's fighter arsenal, but were heavy, under-powered and poorly armed by international standards. The physical form of the base in late 1940 consisted of the two earth runways, accommodation blocks, messes, gymnasium, workshops and one hangar with a control tower, all recently completed or still under construction. In May 1941 RAAF Townsville became Northern Area Headquarters RAAF.

In the first twelve months there were changes to the base layout. There were doubts about Townsville City Council's ability to keep up electricity supply in an emergency, so in 1941 a powerhouse with its own diesel-powered generator was built on the base. Australia agreed to train pilots under the Empire Air Training Scheme, and a second Officers Accommodation Block was built at RAAF Townsville to house trainees.

Bigger changes were coming. As events moved inexorably toward war in the Pacific, the United States Army Air Forces (USAAF) became concerned about securing air routes to re-supply their forces at Clark Field and elsewhere in the Philippines. By September 1941, the USAAF was reinforcing its air bases in the Philippines with B-17 heavy bombers, and the Australian War Cabinet agreed secretly to an American request for space at the Townsville and Darwin air bases to develop their own ferrying facilities. USAAF officers arrived in Townsville in October 1941 to plan the expansion of the new airfield to take larger aircraft and heavier traffic than it had been originally designed for. The existing two gravelled runways were expanded into three sealed runways, and the south-east orientated runway was extended to 5,000 ft (1,500 m) long to take heavy bombers and transport aircraft. The expansion was undertaken in six weeks of round-the-clock effort, and was completed on 15 December 1941. Japan had entered the war a week earlier.

=== War in the Pacific ===
==== Defensive phase ====
In the face of the Japanese threat, the development of Townsville's new RAAF base during the previous two years was now overtaken by even faster expansion, as Australian and American forces poured into Townsville from January 1942 onward. In recent years much has been made of the now-notorious "Brisbane Line" doctrine, based on the realisation that in the event of Japanese invasion, Australia had only the military resources to defend the industrial south-east of the continent between Brisbane and Melbourne. While the Australian government adopted this as a loose principle, it was always intended to hold Townsville as a military base north of this line. In January 1942 the command structure was re-organised, and RAAF Townsville became North-Eastern Area Headquarters RAAF. In April, General Blamey, commanding Allied Land Forces in the South-West Pacific Area, stationed two Australian infantry brigades in a defensive ring around Townsville, but one of these was sent on to Port Moresby a month later.

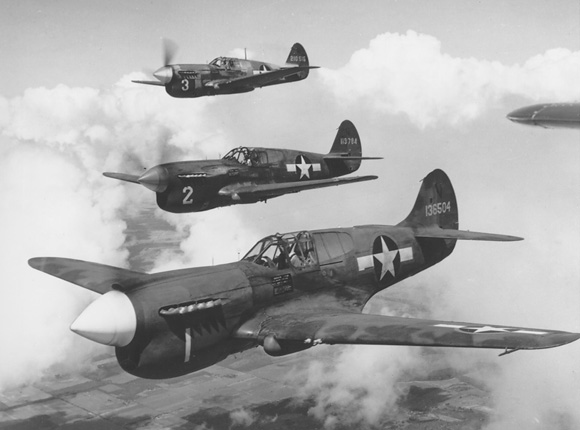
Curtiss P-40 Warhawks USAF

Air defences were strengthened simultaneously. The Wirraway fighters which had proved inadequate at Rabaul and Darwin were replaced by Bell P-39 Airacobras, and Townsville's aerial defence was supplemented by RAAF and USAAF Curtiss P-40 Warhawks. In the surrounding district, strips for dispersal, ferrying, supply and maintenance were built at Bohle River (or Mount St John), Woodstock, Antill Plains, Reid River and Macrossan. Ross River was occupied by the RAAF, and a USAAF heavy bombardment field was established at Breddan, north of the city of Charters Towers. It was planned to base a second fighter squadron, No.32, at Townsville, but the airstrip did not have sufficient space for two operational squadrons, and the second one was located first at Macrossan, then at Charters Towers. Although early plans of the Townsville base show three fighter hangars, only one was ever built, presumably because to base more than one squadron of aircraft there would have made the base both too crowded to operate efficiently, and extremely vulnerable to attack.

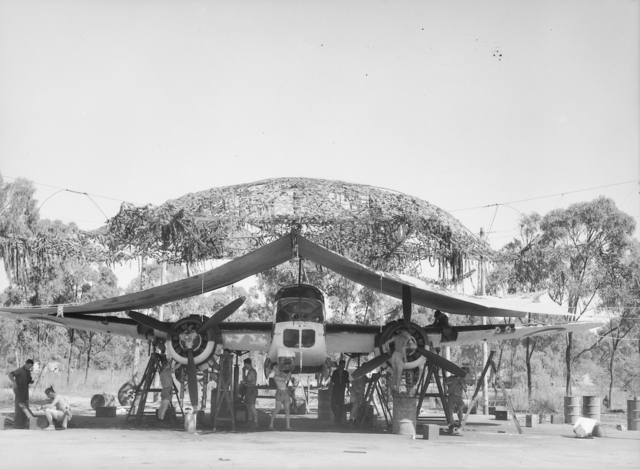
Servicing party working on a DAP Beaufort bomber aircraft of No. 7 Squadron RAAF

The role of the airfield now diversified well beyond the fighter defence of Townsville. North-eastern Australia became the operational theatre of the US Fifth Air Force, its headquarters in Brisbane, with the headquarters of its V Bomber Command in Townsville. The USAAF 435th Aerial Bombardment Squadron and 8th Photo Squadron carried out aerial reconnaissance missions from Townsville over the whole theatre of war from New Guinea to the Solomon Islands. Ground-based bombers and reconnaissance aircraft from Townsville played a part in the Battle of the Coral Sea, fought a few hundred kilometres to the north-east in May 1942. In the confusion that characterised the aerial engagement, B-17 bombers of the USAAF 435th Squadron from Townsville bombed an allied naval force including the Australian cruisers HMAS Australia and HMAS Hobart, fortunately without inflicting damage.

The USAAF IV Air Corps Depot was also established in Townsville, its principal functions being the assembly, repair and servicing of USAAF aircraft operating throughout the South-West Pacific theatre of war. Large maintenance hangars were built alongside the runway north of the original RAAF base. In an ingenious attempt to conceal the air base from aerial observation, a pattern of streets and houses resembling the neighbouring suburb was painted over the southern end of the runways, but this camouflage either looked unconvincing or was thought unnecessary, for it was abandoned within a few months.

The facilities required for aircraft assembly and repair work soon extended far beyond the perimeter of the original Townsville airfield, and during 1942, new airstrips were built at Aitkenvale (or Weir) and Stockroute, with a huge complex of hangars, workshops and dispersal taxiways extending across what are now the suburbs of Vincent, Heatley, Mount Louisa, Kirwan and Condon. This growing complex of airfields brought about a change of name; the base had originally been known as RAAF Townsville in 1939, but the construction of Aitkenvale and Stockroute in 1942 made this designation potentially confusing. The original base was now renamed RAAF Garbutt, the name of the local railway station, to distinguish it from the other airfields in the near vicinity. (Garbutt railway siding had a cattle ramp and yards and was named after its biggest customer, Garbutt Brothers, wholesale butchers.)

In the course of the later war years 1942–45, a large number of RAAF units passed through the Garbutt-Stockroute complex: No. 33 Squadron (Empire flying boats) in 1942, No. 40 Squadron (Sunderlands and Catalinas) in 1944, No. 41 Squadron (Mariners) in 1942–44, No. 75 Squadron (Kittyhawks) in 1942, and No. 86 Squadron (Kittyhawks) in 1943. Many USAAF units were also based at the complex. In the surrounding area, No. 7 Squadron (Beauforts) was based at Ross River in 1942–44, No. 8 Squadron (Beauforts) was based at Bohle River in 1943, No. 30 Squadron (Beaufighters) was based at Bohle River in 1942, No. 76 Squadron (Kittyhawks) was based at Weir in 1942, No. 80 Squadron (Kittyhawks) was based at Weir in 1943–44, No. 82 and No. 84 Squadrons (Kittyhawks) were based at Weir in 1944, No. 86 Squadron (Kittyhawks) was based at Bohle River in 1944, and No. 5 Repair and Service Unit was based at Bohle River in 1944.

RAAF Townsville was a dry, dusty place for much of the time. Wartime aerial photographs show not a single tree or patch of lawn on the base. The storm drains on the flat ground were often inadequate for runoff, and the runways sometimes flooded during tropical downpours. Engineering contractors were constantly at work improving the base's drainage. Even at the height of the wartime emergency, civilian access to the base seems to have been relatively unrestricted. A 1944 plan of RAAF Garbutt shows that, although there was a main entrance past the guardhouse, there were also other driveways off Ingham Road into the Officers' Mess, and the unfenced road to the civil aviation area ran past the Sergeants Accommodation Blocks. Contractors and suppliers came and went every day. Local people continued to collect firewood and swim in the waterholes on the Town Common. Civilians were often invited to mess nights and regularly attended movies and dances in the base Gymnasium.

Garbutt's fighter aircraft briefly played a role in the defence of Australian territory. On three occasions in late July 1942, Townsville was bombed late at night by long-range Japanese flying boats based in Rabaul. These attacks accompanied a general increase in Japanese submarine attacks on shipping along the east coast of Australia, and were probably diversionary in purpose, for they coincided with the Japanese infantry landings at Gona on the north coast of Papua. All three events were minor nuisance raids and completely ineffectual, with no injuries or significant damage. In the early morning of 28 July a stick of bombs, possibly aimed from high altitude at the general vicinity of the airfield, landed at the northern end of the Town Common near the Many Peaks Range, over 4 km (2.5 mi) from the nearest buildings at RAAF Garbutt. The heavy anti-aircraft battery on Mount St John, west of Garbutt airfield, went into action, and on the second and third occasions, USAAF P-39 Airacobra fighters from Garbutt base also pursued the bombers. On 29 July a P-39 inflicted damage on the departing Japanese aircraft. Perhaps because of this increasingly spirited opposition, that was the last bombing raid on Townsville.

==== Offensive phase ====
The threat to northern Australia had diminished by the second half of 1942, because the strategic initiative in the Pacific had been regained by the Allied side. The Japanese navy had experienced two decisive defeats, first in the Coral Sea in May, and then at the Midway Islands in June, seriously damaging Japan's naval air power, which had been the key to its early victories. From mid-1942 onward, the role of the Townsville bases was no longer the defence of Australia, but logistical support for the Allied offensive into Japanese-held territory.

An event in September 1942, eight weeks after the last bombing raid on Townsville, showed that the threat had diminished. Tunnels were being dug under the Garbutt runways so that demolition charges could be laid to prevent an invading enemy capturing the airfield in a usable condition. On 22 September the Allied Works Council ordered work on the demolition tunnels to stop, signalling that there was no longer considered to be a threat of invasion of the Australian mainland.

As the war advanced, and operations moved progressively northwards into the Pacific, so Townsville's complex of airfields were gradually turned into a huge rear echelon workshop. The fighter defence function ceased in 1942, and the bomber function lessened during 1943 as the Japanese were progressively defeated in New Guinea and the Solomons. By January 1944 the bomber squadrons had moved on to Rabaul and other bases, and Townsville became the headquarters of USAAF V Air Service Command and RAAF No. 15 Aircraft Repair Depot. The official history of the USAAF gives an indication of the range of technical work carried out there during the last two years of the war:

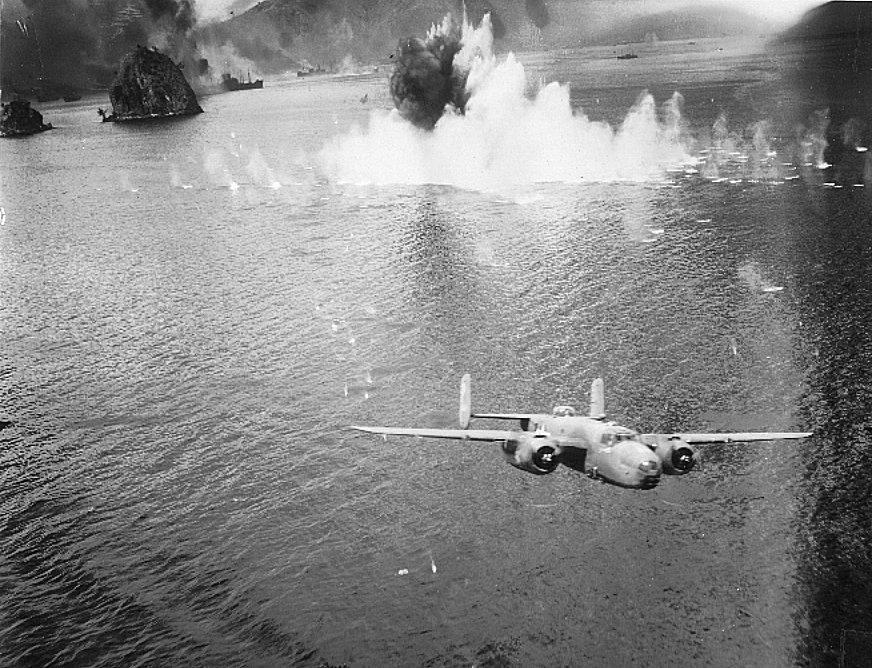
B-25s attacking Japanese shipping over Rabaul's Simpson Harbor.

The depots at Brisbane, Townsville and Port Moresby continued to be marked by the variety of their activities. They not only had to overhaul engines, inspect and repair parachutes, paint aircraft, fill oxygen cylinders, and install armament but they were expected to find all sorts of short cuts and to make odd pieces of equipment from material on hand. The machine shop at Townsville produced, among other things, special propeller tools, a jig-filing machine, an indicating apparatus for hollow-steel propellers, and an electric arc welder for high-melting point soldering on armatures. ... By September 1943, the Townsville depot had converted some 175 B-25C's and D's for low-level strafing, and then turned to the B-25G. Between November and the following April, it would add on eighty-two planes two additional .50-cal. machine guns in the nose, two more in the gun tunnel, and a stinger of twin .30s in the tail – modifications requiring 234 man-hours per plane.

In a rationalisation of the joint Australian-American command structure, control of the Garbutt base was taken over by the USAAF in June 1943. Construction and maintenance were handed back to the RAAF in October 1943, but the USAAF remained in control of operations until April 1945. At the close of the war, Garbutt's RAAF fighter squadron (No. 84) was in the course of conversion to P-51 Mustang fighters. For some time after the war ended, 84 and 86 squadrons were based in the Townsville area before joining the British Commonwealth Occupation Force in Japan.

=== Post-war era ===
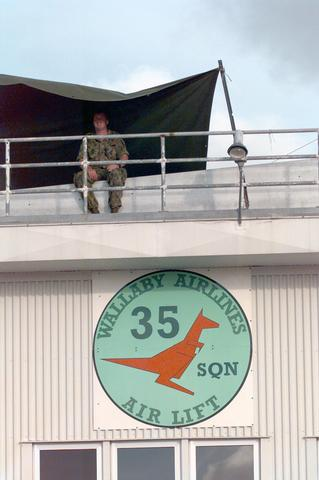
No. 35 Squadron sign at RAAF Base Townsville in 1997.

When hostilities ceased in August 1945, operations rapidly wound down throughout the Townsville military aviation complex, and buildings were being dismantled and sold at auction in the following months. RAAF Garbutt had always been intended as a permanent base, and after the war it shrank back to the size of the base originally planned in 1939 and constructed by late 1940. Some wartime hangars remained in service, and at least one Butler hangar was relocated to the eastern perimeter of Garbutt after Stockroute closed. A large "igloo" or vaulted hangar was erected beside it. No. 11 Squadron briefly operated Catalinas from Townsville in 1948–49, then in 1949 Garbutt became the base for No.10 Reconnaissance Squadron, which operated Avro Lincolns from the field on long-range maritime reconnaissance patrols, with one aircraft usually detached to Darwin.

With the other airfields in the Townsville suburbs closed, the name of the base reverted to its early form of RAAF Townsville in 1951. The Lincolns required a longer runway, and in 1952 further land to the north was acquired from the Town Common to extend the north–south runway. In March 1956 Cyclone Agnes struck Townsville, damaging buildings at the RAAF base. The Lincoln aircraft were hangared in the two large wartime hangars during the storm, but this was not adequate: the vaulted hangar was damaged, and subsequently had to be demolished. A Lincoln was destroyed and another severely damaged in the hangar failure. Since this experience, aircraft have been flown out of Townsville during tropical cyclones. In 1962, the Lincolns were replaced by Lockheed P-2 Neptunes.

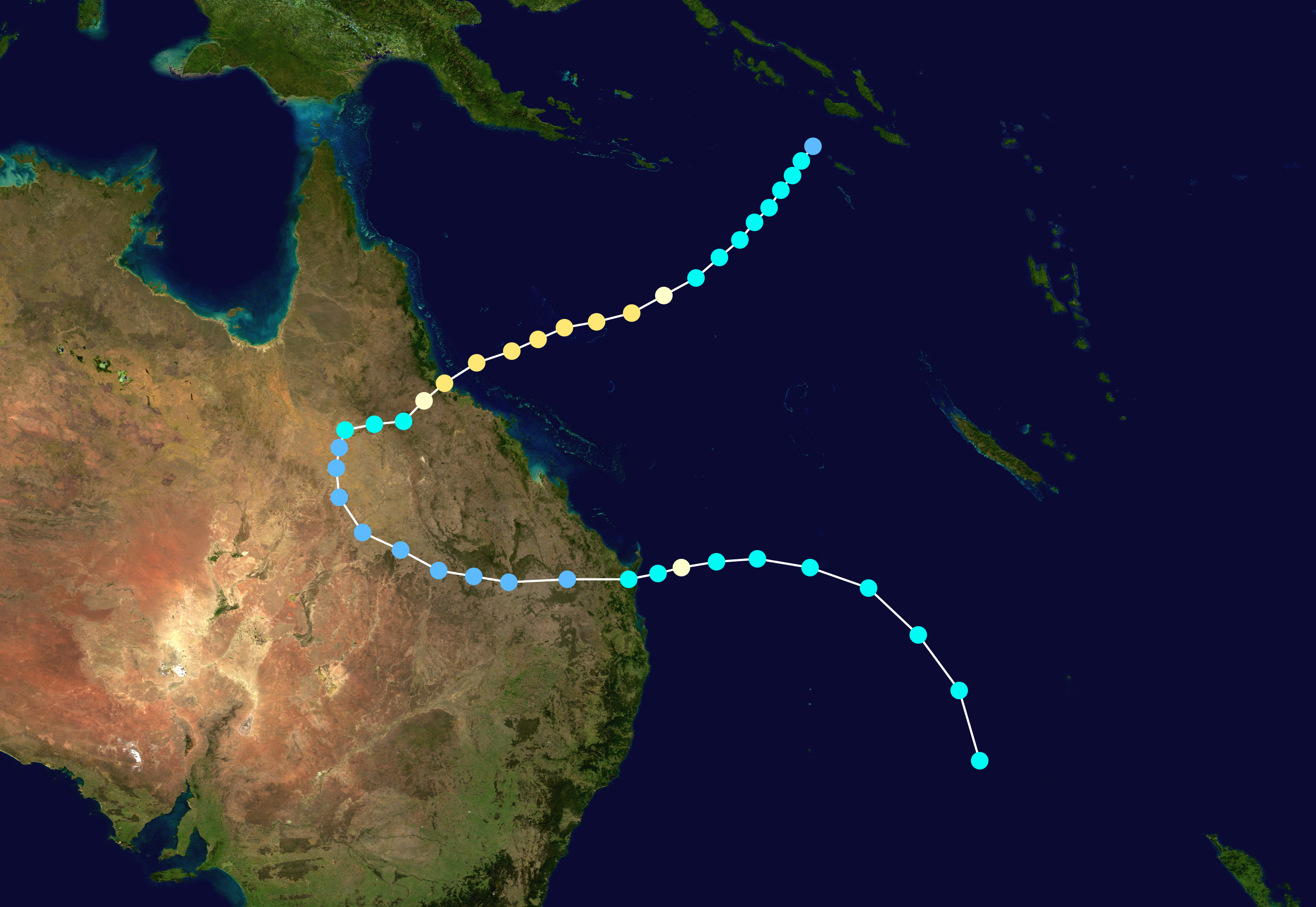
Storm path of Cyclone Althea (1971)

The civil airport, which had operated limited services throughout the war, expanded after 1945, and the airlines moved their operations into some of the wartime hangars relocated from the Stockroute complex. Several of these buildings remained in service for more than twenty years. The 1940 control tower on Hangar 75 functioned until 1960, when it was replaced by the present brick control tower. Major damage was done to the civil terminal by the even more severe Cyclone Althea in 1971, and there was also some damage to the RAAF base. Learning from the 1956 experience, the Neptune aircraft had been flown out. An international terminal was built in 1981, and in 1987 a new domestic terminal replaced the last of the 1942 hangars. In 1990 the Federal Airports Corporation acquired the piece of RAAF land occupied by the domestic and international terminals.

The role of RAAF Base Townsville changed in the 1960s and 1970s with the general northward shift of Australia's defence bases. In 1960, the majority of Australia's armed forces were still based near the southern capital cities, as they had been since the 1880s, but experience in Malaya, Sarawak and Vietnam changed the emphasis of defence policy to preparedness for limited regional conflicts. The level of military aviation activity at Townsville began to increase after the establishment in 1966 of Lavarack Barracks, which steadily grew to become Australia's largest Army base, and the Headquarters of the Third Task Force. In 1976, No. 35 Squadron was based at Townsville in support of Army operations. However, the following year No. 10 Squadron was relocated to RAAF Base Edinburgh in South Australia, and over thirty years of maritime reconnaissance operations from Townsville ceased.

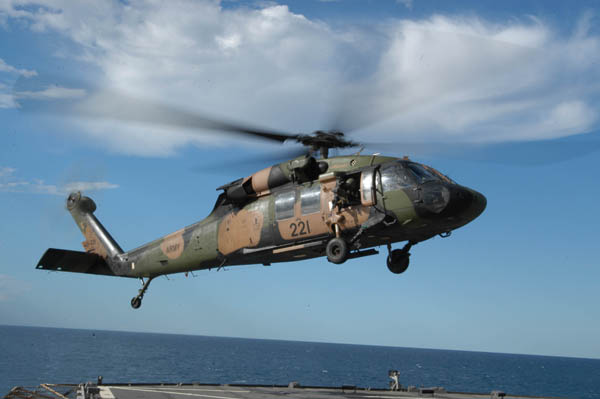
An Australian S-70A-9 Black Hawk helicopter

For the next twenty years No. 35 Squadron operated Caribou transports and Iroquois helicopters in support of the Australian Army, but has now been disbanded and incorporated into No. 38 Squadron, performing the same role. In 1989, No. 9 Squadron with Black Hawk helicopters was briefly based at RAAF Townsville, before handing over its aircraft to the Australian Army and disbanding, as part of a new policy of placing battlefield helicopters under Army command. The Army occupied dedicated facilities at RAAF Base Townsville, and the 5th Aviation Regiment now operates Black Hawk and Chinook helicopters from a complex in the south-west corner of the base.

Changes in operational requirements from the 1960s to the 1990s and improvements in technologies such as telecommunications, have greatly expanded the physical requirements of RAAF Townsville. New administrative buildings, workshops and accommodation blocks have been added in a series of changes over the last three decades.

=== 21st century ===
The most recent developments in 2000–2001 have seen the expansion of operational infrastructure with the provision of fighter/strike and maritime patrol ordnance loading aprons, new taxiways and a fighter/strike operational and technical support facility. While fighter, strike and maritime patrol aircraft are not currently based at Townsville, these facilities are in keeping with current Defence of Australia policy practice of creating "bare bases" which are ready to receive operational aircraft at short notice. The Aviation Heritage Centre (RTAHC) located at the base reopened in August 2025 after a major five-year refurbishment.

With the announced increases in military spending in 2023, RAAF Townsville is expected to share in $2 billion to be spent across RAAF bases Learmonth, Scherger and Townsville to improve ADF readiness. The money will be allocated to improve runways, fuel storage and supply, accommodation and security. Furthermore, Army announced the relocation of the 1st Aviation Regiment to RAAF Townsville, with the acquisition of AH-64E Apache Guardian attack helicopters.

== Military units ==
The following units are located at RAAF Base Townsville:

| Unit | Unit name | Force Element Group | Aircraft | Notes |
|---|---|---|---|---|
| 383SQN | No. 383 Squadron | | | Contingency Response |
| 452SQN | No. 452 Squadron Townsville Flight | | | Air traffic control |
| 27SQN | No. 27 (City of Townsville) Squadron | Combat Support Group | | Airbase Operations |
| CSTS | Combat Survival Training School | Training Command | | |
| 5AV RAR | 5th Aviation Regiment | Australian Army | CH-47F Chinook; UH-60M Black Hawk | |
| | 1 Expeditionary Health Squadron Detachment Townsville | | —N/a | |
| | No. 2 Security Squadron detachment Townsville | | —N/a | |

RAAF Townsville houses a significant selection of other military units, including:

- Mechanical Equipment Operations and Maintenance Section (referred to as MEOMS, part of 27SQN).
- Headquarters, No. 1 Wing Australian Air Force Cadets (HQ1WGAAFC)
- No. 101 Squadron AAFC

== See also ==
- United States Army Air Forces in Australia (World War II)
- List of airports in Queensland
- List of Royal Australian Air Force installations
