= Combat Survival Training School RAAF =

Combat Survival Training School
- Branch: RAAF
- Part of: Air Training Wing
- Garrison/HQ: RAAF Base Townsville
- Mottos: Adapt and Return

Combat Survival Training School is a survive, evade, resist, escape (SERE) school for the Royal Australian Air Force. Its base is at RAAF Base Townsville. Its motto is "Adapt and Return".

All Australian Defence Force aircrew are required to complete a 15-day SERE course delivered by the Combat Survival Training School. As well as teaching survival skills, including how to evade enemy personnel, students are instructed in techniques to resist interrogation and escape captivity. In 2014, it was reported that the course was "one of the hardest things that any air force flyer will do".
