= List of Royal Australian Air Force air marshals =

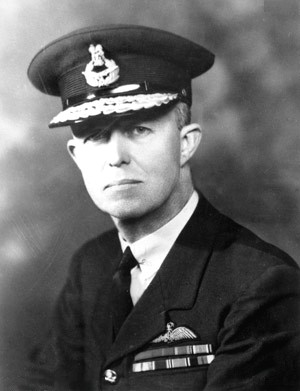
Sir Richard Williams, the first officer of the Royal Australian Air Force to attain air marshal rank

The following is a list of Australians who have attained air marshal rank within the Royal Australian Air Force (RAAF); that is, service personnel who have held the rank of air chief marshal (four-star rank), air marshal (three-star rank) or air vice-marshal (two-star rank). The Royal Australian Air Force was established in 1921 as a separate branch of the Australian military forces. The service was modelled after the Royal Air Force—formed three years earlier—and adopted the same ranking system. Richard Williams, regarded as the "father" of the Royal Australian Air Force, was the service's first member to obtain air-officer rank on being promoted to air commodore (one-star rank) in 1927; he went on to become the first air vice-marshal (1935) and air marshal (1940). In 1965, Sir Frederick Scherger became the first officer to be advanced to air chief marshal, one of only four members of the Royal Australian Air Force to obtain this rank as of February 2024. A further twenty-six individuals have reached air marshal in the RAAF and 147 air vice-marshal; seven officers have retired with the honorary rank of air vice-marshal.

== Air chief marshals ==
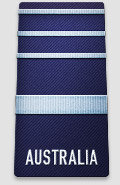
Australian air chief marshal's rank insignia

This along with the * (asterisk) indicates that the air chief marshal is still a serving member of the RAAF.

A dash (—) in the "Died" column indicates that the person is still living.

The rank of air chief marshal is the most senior rank within the Royal Australian Air Force to which, excluding ceremonial appointments, any officer has ever been promoted. Only the five-star rank of Marshal of the Royal Australian Air Force is higher, but it has been held in only a ceremonial capacity. As there are currently no appointments in the Australian Defence Force (ADF) at the five-star level, there is no prospect of a RAAF officer achieving the rank in a professional (i.e. non-ceremonial) capacity. Additionally, Marshal of the Royal Australian Air Force is generally considered to be a marshal rank as opposed to an air marshal rank and so the only two individuals ever to hold the rank, King George VI and Prince Philip, Duke of Edinburgh, are not listed in a separate section. With the current structure of the ADF, the rank of air chief marshal is held only when an officer of the RAAF is appointed as Chief of the Defence Force. As of June 2018, only four officers have obtained the rank of air chief marshal in the RAAF, the first being Sir Frederick Scherger in 1965 who was also the first non-Army officer in the Australian military to reach four-star rank. Mark Binskin is the most-recently promoted of the four, having been advanced to air chief marshal in June 2014.

Air chief marshals of the Royal Australian Air Force are as follows:

Name	Born	Died	Senior command(s) and notes
Mark Binskin	1960	—	Chief of the Defence Force (2014–18), Vice Chief of the Defence Force (2011–14), Chief of Air Force (2008–11), Air Commander Australia (2007–08)
Sir Angus Houston	1947	—	Chief of the Defence Force (2005–11), Chief of Air Force (2001–05)
Sir Neville McNamara	1923	2014	Chief of the Defence Force Staff (1982–84), Chief of the Air Staff (1979–82), Commander, RAAF Forces Vietnam (1971–72)
Sir Frederick Scherger	1904	1984	Chairman, Chiefs of Staff Committee (1961–66), Chief of the Air Staff (1957–61)

== Air marshals ==
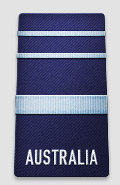
Australian air marshal's rank insignia

This along with the * (asterisk) indicates that the air marshal is still a serving member of the RAAF.

A dash (—) in the "Died" column indicates that the person is still living.

Air marshal is the highest permanent rank in the Royal Australian Air Force. The rank of air marshal is always held by the Chief of Air Force, though is also held when a RAAF officer is appointed as Vice Chief of the Defence Force, Chief of Joint Operations, Chief of Joint Capabilities or equivalent positions. Richard Williams was the first officer to attain the rank of air marshal in the RAAF on promotion in 1940. Regarded as the 'father' of the Royal Australian Air Force, Williams was its first and longest serving chief, being appointed to the post during three different periods and serving for a total of thirteen years. Glen Braz is the most recent officer to obtain the rank of air marshal, having been promoted to the rank in July 2026.

Air marshals of the Royal Australian Air Force are as follows:

Name	Born	Died	Senior command(s) and notes
Glen Braz*	1969	—	Chief of Joint Capabilities (2026–), Air Commander Australia (2023–26), Deputy Chief of Air Force (2023), First Assistant Director-General Expeditionary and Transnational Intelligence Division (2020–22)
Geoff Brown	1958	—	Chief of Air Force (2011–15), Deputy Chief of Air Force (2008–11)
Stephen Chappell*	1975	—	Chief of Air Force (2024–), Head Military Strategic Commitments (2022–24)
Robert Chipman*	1971	—	Vice Chief of the Defence Force (2024–), Chief of Air Force (2022–24)
Leo Davies	1960	—	Chief of Air Force (2015–19), Deputy Chief of Air Force (2012–15)
David Evans	1925	2020	Chief of the Air Staff (1982–85), Chief of Joint Operations and Plans (1980–82)
Les Fisher	1941	—	Chief of Air Force (1997–98), Chief of the Air Staff (1994–97)
Ray Funnell	1935	—	Chief of the Air Staff (1987–92), Vice Chief of the Defence Force (1986–87)
Darren Goldie	1975	—	National Cyber Security Coordinator (2023), Air Commander Australia (2022–23)
Barry Gration	1936	—	Chief of Air Force (1992–94), Air Commander Australia (1990–92). Brother of General Peter Gration
Sir Valston Hancock	1907	1998	Chief of the Air Staff (1961–65), Air Officer Commanding Operational Command (1959–61)
Sir Colin Hannah	1914	1978	Governor of Queensland (1972–77), Chief of the Air Staff (1970–72), Air Officer Commanding Operational Command (1965–67)
John Harvey	1954	—	Chief of Capability Development Group (2010–12), Program Manager, New Air Combat Capability (2006–10)
Mel Hupfeld	1962	—	Chief of Air Force (2019–22), Chief of Joint Operations (2018–19), Head Force Design (2016–18), Head Capability Systems (2014–15), Air Commander Australia (2012–14)
Sir George Jones	1896	1992	Director of Coordination, Commonwealth Aircraft Corporation (1952–57), Chief of the Air Staff (1942–52)
Sir John McCauley	1899	1989	Chief of the Air Staff (1954–57), Air Officer Commanding Home Command (1949–54)
Warren McDonald	1963	—	Chief of Joint Capabilities (2017–20), Deputy Chief of Air Force (2015–17)
Errol McCormack	1941	2024	Chief of Air Force (1998–01), Deputy Chief of Air Force (1997–98)
Sir Alister Murdoch	1912	1984	Chief of the Air Staff (1965–69), Air Officer Commanding Operational Command (1962–65)
John Newham	1930	2022	Chief of the Air Staff (1985–87), Deputy Chief of the Air Staff (1984–85)
Leon Phillips	1969	—	Chief of Guided Weapons and Explosive Ordnance (2023–26), Head Aerospace Systems Division (2022–23)
Sir Charles Read	1918	2014	Chief of the Air Staff (1972–75), Deputy Chief of the Air Staff (1970–72)
Douglas Riding	1943	—	Vice Chief of the Defence Force (1998–00)
Sir James Rowland	1922	1999	Governor of New South Wales (1981–89), Chief of the Air Staff (1975–79)
Geoff Shepherd	1952	—	Chief of Air Force (2005–08), Air Commander Australia (2003–05)
Sir Richard Williams	1890	1980	Director-General of Civil Aviation (1946–55), Air Officer Commanding Overseas Headquarters (1941–42), Chief of the Air Staff (1922; 1925–32; 1934–39)

== Air vice-marshals ==
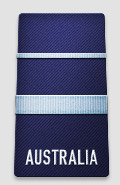
Australian air vice-marshal's rank insignia

This along with the * (asterisk) indicates that the air vice-marshal is still a serving member of the RAAF.
This along with the + (plus) indicates that the officer retired with the honorary rank of air vice-marshal.

A dash (—) in the "Died" column indicates that the person is still living.

The first Royal Australian Air Force air vice-marshal was Richard Williams in 1935; he was followed by Stanley Goble—Williams' successor all three times he held the position of Chief of the Air Staff—two years later. The list of RAAF air vice-marshals includes Frank McNamara, the first Australian aviator to be decorated with the Victoria Cross (VC). McNamara was awarded the VC in 1917 while serving with the Australian Flying Corps, the Australian Army's air branch and predecessor of the RAAF, in the First World War; he was promoted air vice-marshal in 1942. As of January 2023, six women have reached air vice-marshal rank. On promotion to air vice-marshal in 2003, Julie Hammer became the first woman to achieve two-star rank in the ADF. Hammer has since been joined by Margaret Staib (2010), Tracy Smart (2015), Cath Roberts (2016), Barbara Courtney (2021), Wendy Blyth (2022), and Dianne Turton (2024).

Air vice-marshals of the Royal Australian Air Force are as follows:

Name	Born	Died	Senior command(s) and notes
Henry Acton	1902	1971	Air Member for Supply and Equipment (1956–60)
John Adams	1922	1990	Air Officer Commanding Operational Command (1978–80)
William Anderson+	1891	1975	Air Officer Commanding Eastern Area (1942–43), Air Officer Commanding Central Area (1940–41), Chief of the Air Staff (1940)
Tony Austin	1953	—	Head Defence Health Services (2005–08), Director-General Defence Health Services (2002–05)
Frederick Barnes	1924	2018	Deputy Chief of the Air Staff (1979–81)
Hugh Bartholomeusz	1953	—	Surgeon General Australian Defence Force Reserves (2011–19)
Gary Beck	1942	—	Commandant, Australian Defence Force Academy (1996–97), Air Commander Australia (1992–96)
John Blackburn	1956	—	Deputy Chief of the Air Staff (2005–08)
Frank Bladin	1898	1978	Air Officer Commanding Eastern Area (1947–48), Deputy Chief of the Air Staff (1944–46), Air Officer Commanding North-Western Area (1942–43)
Wendy Blyth*	1974	—	Head Force Design (2025–), Head of Air Force Capability (2023–24)
Richard Bomball	1937	—	Commandant, Australian Defence Force Academy (1990–93)
William Bostock	1892	1968	Federal Member for Indi (1949–58), Air Officer Commanding RAAF Command (1942–45), Deputy Chief of the Air Staff (1939–42)
Richard Bradford	1936	2001	Deputy Chief of the Air Staff (1987–90)
Douglas Cameron	1930	—	Director-General Policy and Plans (1981–84)
Douglas Candy	1912	1985	Air Officer Commanding Home Command (1958–59), Deputy Chief of the Air Staff (1956–58)
Ernest Carroll	1925	2010	Chief of Supply (1980–82)
Alan Charlesworth+	1903	1978	Air Officer Commanding Overseas Headquarters (1954–55), Air Officer Commanding North-Western Area (1944–46), Air Officer Commanding Eastern Area (1943–44)
Nathan Christie*	1972	—	Commander Integrated Area Defence System, Malaysia (2024–)
Kerry Clarke	1948	—	Head Capability Systems (2002–05), Commander Five Power Defence Arrangements (2000–02)
Colin Cleary	1913	1995	Air Member for Supply and Equipment (1968–73)
Alan Clements	1963	—	Head of Australian Defence Staff, Washington, D.C. (2017–20)
Adrian Cole+	1895	1966	Air Member for Personnel (1944–45), Air Officer Commanding North-Western Area (1943–44), Air Officer Commanding Southern Area (1940–41)
Billie Collings	1932	—	Deputy Chief of the Air Staff (1985–87)
William Collins	1939	—	Air Officer Commanding Logistics Command (1990–93)
Lyndon Crompton	1922	2004	Chief of Air Force Technical Services (1975–1979)
Raymond Conroy	1947	—	Head Aerospace Systems Division (1990–91)
John Cornish	1922	2018	Chief of Air Force Materiel (1975–79)
Barbara Courtney*	1963	—	Head Royal Commission Defence and Veteran Suicide Taskforce (2021–)
Franklin Cox	1941	—	Assistant Chief of the Defence Force (Personnel) (1994–97)
Denis Creal	1903	1993	Air Member for Supply and Equipment (1960–64)
Peter Criss	1949	—	Air Commander Australia (1999–00)
Edward Daley	1901	1985	Director-General RAAF Medical Services (1945–61), Director Medical Services (1943–45)
Chris Deeble	1957	—	Program Manager for the Joint Strike Fighter Division (2014–16), Program Manager, Airborne Early Warning and Control (2006–14)
Robert Denney	1972	—	Head Force Integration (2023–24), Head of Air Force Capability (2021–23)
Joseph Dietz	1929	1985	Chief of Air Force Technical Services (1981–85)
Desmond Douglas	1917	1980	Australian Defence Representative in Washington D.C. (1970–74)
Andrew Dowse	1963	—	Head of ICT Operations and Strategic J6 (2014–17)
David Dunlop	1949	—	Director-General Defence Force Cadets (2003–05), Director-General Reserves (2002–03)
Brian Eaton	1916	1982	Air Officer Commanding Operational Command (1973), Deputy Chief of the Air Staff (1966–67)
Stephen Edgeley*	1970	—	Assistant to the Chief of the Defence Force (2023–), Commander Australian Defence College (2022–23)
Graham Edwards	1965	—	Head Aerospace Systems Division (2023–26)
Brenton Espeland	1948	2017	Advisor to Sydney 2000 Summer Olympics Coordination Task Force (1999–01), Deputy Chief of Air Force (1998–99), Air Officer Commanding Training Command (1995–98)
Greg Evans	1957	—	Deputy Chief of Joint Operations (2008–09), Commander Joint Task Force 633 (2004–05)
James Flemming	1926	2015	Director, Australian War Memorial (1982–87)
Roy Frost	1930	2001	Chief of Air Force Materiel (1982–83)
William Gibson+	1915	1982	Senior Air Staff Officer Operational Command (1963–64, 1966–67), Senior Air Staff Officer Far East Air Force (1964–66)
Stanley Goble	1891	1948	Chief of the Air Staff (1922–25; 1932–34; 1939–40)
Leigh Gordon	1961	—	Head Joint Strike Fighter Division (2016–20), Head Aerospace Systems Division (2013–16)
Brian Graf	1937	—	Director-General Technical Plans (1987–88)
Norman Gray	1952	—	Chief Executive Officer, Defence Materiel Organisation (2004–05)
Julie Hammer	1955	—	National President, Engineers Australia (2007–08), Commandant, Australian Defence Force Academy (2001–03). First female to be promoted air commodore and air vice-marshal in RAAF; first female promoted to two-star rank in ADF.
Neil Hart	1963	—	Head One Defence Implementation (2015–17), Head Force Structure Review (2014–16), Head Joint Capability Coordination (2012–13), Deputy Chief of Air Force (2011)
Geoffrey Harland	1966	—	Commander Integrated Area Defence System, Malaysia (2020–24)
Geoffrey Hartnell	1916	1981	Director Joint Service Plans (1966–68)
Frank Headlam	1914	1976	Deputy Chief of the Air Staff (1965–66)
Alan Heggen	1932	—	Chief of Logistics Development (1988–89)
Michael Helsham	1921	2002	Judge Advocate-General RAAF (1969–84)
John Hely*	—	—	Head Military Strategic Planning (2025–)
William Hely	1909	1970	Air Officer Commanding Training Command (1956–57), Deputy Chief of the Air Staff (1953–55), Air Officer Commanding Western Area (1951–53)
William Henman	1959	—	Commander Integrated Area Defence System, Malaysia (2014–17)
Keith Hennock	1918	1999	Air Officer Commanding Operational Command (1967–69)
Joe Hewitt	1901	1985	No. 9 Operational Group RAAF (1943)
Ernest Hey	1912	2006	Air Member for Technical Services (1960–72)
Colin Hingston	1949	—	Head Business Information Systems (2000–02)
Gregory Hoffmann	1967	—	Head Aerospace Systems Division and Head Air Domain (2019–22)
Nicholas Hogan*	—	—	Head of Air Force Capability (2024–)
Leslie Holten	1916	2006	Air Member for Supply and Equipment (1973–75)
Henry Hughes	1928	2005	Deputy Chief of the Air Staff (1981–83)
Douglas Hurditch	1921	2018	Deputy Chief of the Air Staff (1974–75)
Sir Victor Hurley	1888	1958	Director-General Medical Services RAAF (1942–45)
Tim Innes	1960	—	Commander Integrated Area Defence System (2017–20), Commander Joint Task Force 633 (2016–17)
Joe Iervasi	1967	—	Air Commander Australia (2019–22), Commander Joint Task Force 633 (2019)
John Jordan	1923	2018	Air Member for Personnel (1975–76)
John Kindler	1946	—	Air Commander Australia (2000–03)
Michael Kitcher	1965	—	Deputy Chief of Joint Operations (2021–24)
Russell Law	1928	2021	Air Officer Commanding Operational Command (1981–84)
Gerry van Leeuwen*	1970	—	Head Aerospace Systems Division (2026–), Head Guided Weapons & Explosive Ordnance (2022–25)
John Lessels	1930	1999	Director-General Natural Disasters Organisation (1984–87)
Warren Ludwig	1960	—	Commander Integrated Area Defence System, Malaysia (2010–14)
John Lush+	1915	1977	Air Officer Commanding Support Command (1969–70), Commander, RAAF Forces Vietnam (1967–68)
George Mackinolty	1895	1951	Air Member for Supply and Equipment (1942–51)
Ian McLachlan	1911	1991	Deputy Chief of the Air Staff (1959–61), Air Officer Commanding Training Command (1957–59)
Roxley McLennan	1950	—	Deputy Chief of Air Force (2004–05), Commander Integrated Area Defence System, Malaysia (2002–04), Commander Air Lift Group (1998–00)
Frank McNamara+	1894	1961	Air Officer Commanding British Forces Aden (1942–45), Air Officer Commanding Overseas Headquarters (1942). First Australian aviator to receive the Victoria Cross.
Anthony Marsh	1915	1994	Director-General Medical Services RAAF (1967–71)
Stephen Meredith	1967	—	Deputy Chief of Air Force (2019–23), Head Force Integration (2017–19), Commander Air Warfare Centre (2016–17)
Michael Miller	1935	2016	Surgeon-General Australian Defence Force (1990–92), Director General Air Force Health Services (1987–90)
Graeme Moller	1943	—	Surgeon-General Australian Defence Force (1996–98), Director General Air Force Health Services (1990–93)
John Monaghan	1954	—	Head Aerospace Systems Division (2002–04)
David Morgan	1920	1995	Director-General RAAF Medical Services (1971–80)
Graham Neil	1937	—	Assistant Chief of the Defence Force (Personnel) (1990–92), Assistant Chief of the Air Staff (Personnel) (1989–90)
Carl Newman*	1971	—	Head of Australian Defence Staff, Washington, D.C. (2026–), Deputy Commander, United States Pacific Air Forces (2023–25)
Geoffrey Newstead	1920	2004	Air Officer Commanding Support Command (1973–77), Deputy Chief of the Air Staff (1972–73), Commander, RAAF Forces Vietnam (1968–69)
Alastair Nicholson	1938	—	Judge Advocate-General Australian Defence Force (1987–92), Judge Advocate General RAAF (1983–85)
Peter Nicholson	1946	—	Air Commander Australia (1996–98)
Rodney Noble	1921	1995	Chief of Air Force Technical Services (1979–81)
Martin Nussio*	—	—	Head Air Defence and Space Systems (2026–)
Thomas O'Brien	1939	—	Deputy Chief of the Air Staff (1990–93)
Brendan O'Loghlin	1944	—	Air Officer Commanding Training Command (1994–95)
Stephen Osborne	1963	—	Commander Operation Sovereign Borders (2017–18)
Kym Osley	1959	—	Program Manager, New Air Combat Capability (2011–14), Head of Australian Defence Staff, Washington D.C. (2008–11), Commander Air Combat Group (2007–08)
Harold Parker	1924	2006	Director-General Air Force Operations and Plans (1976–77)
Ian Parker	1923	1985	Chief of Air Force Personnel (1976–79)
John Paule	1932	—	Director-General Air Force Manpower (1985–87)
Kevin Paule	1959	—	Head of Military Strategic Commitments (2010–13), Commander Air Force Training Group (2006–07)
Steve Pesce*	—	—	Deputy Chief of Air Force (2026–)
Jack Plenty	1956	—	Head Capability Systems (2008–12), Commander Air Lift Group (2007–08)
John Quaife	1955	—	Head Capability Systems (2007–08), Air Commander Australia (2005–07), Commander Air Combat Group (2002–04)
Edward Radford	1935	—	Deputy Chief of the Air Staff (1990), Air Commander Australia (1985–1990)
Alan Reed	1933	2021	Air Officer Commanding Logistics Command (1987–90)
Glen (Bill) Reed	1937	2016	Director-General Air Force Health Services (1984–87)
Bernard Reynolds	1931	1986	Air Officer Commanding Operational Command (1984–85)
Harvey Reynolds*	—	—	Air Commander Australia (2026–), Deputy Chief of Air Force (2023–26)
Robert Richardson	1941	—	Deputy Chief of Air Force (1997), Air Officer Commanding Training Command (1992–93)
Trevor Richardson	1938	—	Commander Tactical Fighter Group (1988–90)
Michael Ridgway	1928	2011	Air Officer Commanding Operational Command (1980–81)
Steve Roberton	1968	—	Head Force Design (2019–22), Air Commander Australia (2017–19)
Catherine Roberts	1965	—	Head of Space Division (2022–23), Head of Air Force Capability (2019–21), Head Aerospace Systems Division (2016–19)
Frederick Robey	1921	1995	Air Officer Commanding Operational Command (1974–78), Deputy Chief of the Air Staff (1973–74), Commander, RAAF Forces Vietnam (1969–70)
David Rogers	1943	—	Head of Capability Development (1997–98), Deputy Chief of the Air Staff (1994–97)
Hansjorg Roser	1937	2020	Director-General RAAF Tactical Fighter Project (1992–96)
Clive Rossiter	1955	—	Head Aerospace Systems Division (2005–08)
David Scheul	1969	—	Head Air Defence and Space Systems (2022–26)
Peter Scully	1934	—	Air Officer Commanding Support Command (1983–86)
Bruce Short	1942	—	Surgeon-General Australian Defence Force (2001–05)
William Simmonds	1930	2023	Chief of Air Force Operations and Plans (1985–87)
Mark Skidmore	1959	—	Air Commander Australia (2008–12)
Benjamin Sleeman*	—	—	Deputy Chief of Joint Capabilities (2025–), Head of Air Force Capability (2024)
Tracy Smart	1963	—	Commander Joint Health (2015–19)
Neil Smith	1945	—	Air Officer Commanding Support Command (1997–00)
Ian Smith	1953	—	Deputy Head Strategic Reform and Governance (2010–13)
Christopher Spence	1951	—	Commander Joint Logistics (2004–06), Deputy Chief of Air Force (2001–04)
Margaret Staib	1962	—	CEO of Airservices Australia (2012–2015), Commander Joint Logistics (2010–12), Commandant, Australian Defence Force Academy (2009)
Eric Stephenson	1922	2017	Director-General Air Force Health Services (1980–84)
Ronald Susans	1917	1992	Director-General Operational Requirements (1966–69)
Ian Sutherland	1931	—	Chief of Air Force Technical Services (1985–89)
Philip Tammen	1968	—	Head Virginia Acquisition and Commercial Division, Australian Submarine Agency (2023–24)
Colin Thorne	1963	—	Head Aerospace Systems Division (2008–13)
Donald Tidd	1939	—	Assistant Chief of the Defence Force (Logistics) (1993–95)
Alan Titheridge	1946	—	Deputy Chief of Air Force (1999–01), Air Commander Australia (1998–99)
William Townsend	1916	1987	Air Officer Commanding Operational Command (1969–73), Deputy Chief of the Air Staff (1967–69)
Raymond Trebilco	1926	1998	Air Officer Commanding Support Command (1979–80)
Robert Treloar	1946	—	Commander Australian Theatre (1999–01)
Lawrence Trudinger	1915	1985	Director-General Medical Services RAAF (1963–67)
Kenneth Tuckwell	1935	—	Director-General Air Force Operations (1981–82; 1987–88)
Gavin Turnbull	1964	—	Deputy Chief of Air Force (2017–19), Air Commander Australia (2014–17)
Dianne Turton*	—	—	Australian Military Representative to NATO and the European Union (2024–)
Ellis Wackett	1901	1984	Air Member for Technical Services (1942–59)
Allan Walters	1905	1968	Air Officer Commanding Support Command (1959–62), Air Officer Commanding Home Command (1954–57)
Kenneth Watson	1960	—	Commander Northern Command (2011–13)
Elliott Weller	1941	—	Air Officer Commanding Logistics Command (1995–97)
Brian Weston	1945	—	Assistant Chief of the Defence Force (Operations) (1995–97)
Robert White	1926	1998	Chief of Supply (1975–80)
Henry Wrigley+	1892	1987	Air Officer Commanding Overseas Headquarters (1942–46)
Peter Yates	1964	—	Program Manager Enterprise Resource and Planning Project (2016–18)

== See also ==
- List of Australian Army generals
- List of Royal Air Force air chief marshals
