= Stephen Meredith =

Australian air force officer

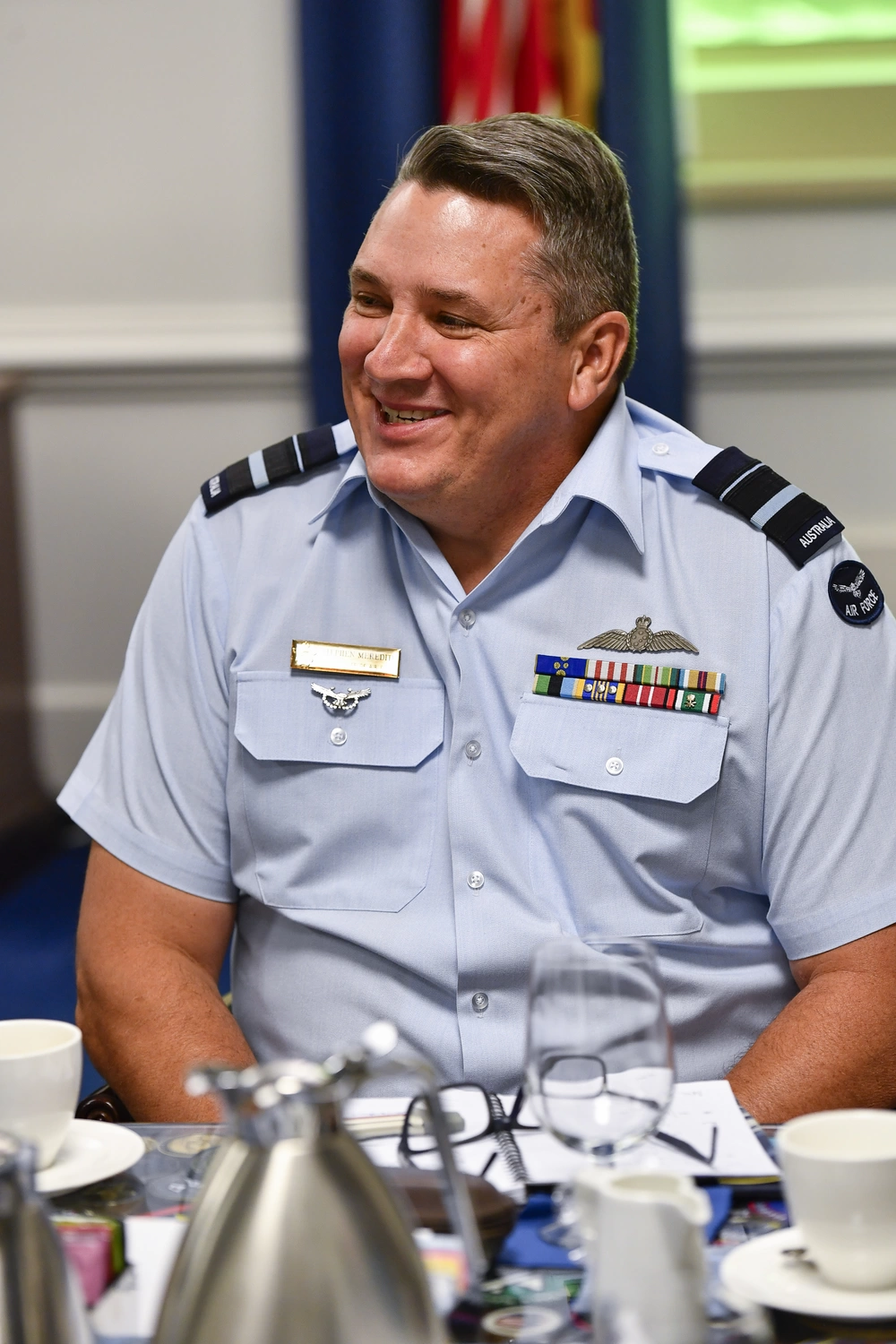
- Meredith in February 2020
- Military career
- Allegiance: Australia
- Branch: Royal Australian Air Force
- Service years: 1986–2023
- Rank: Air Vice Marshal
- Service number: O131100
- Commands: Deputy Chief of Air Force (2019–23); Head Force Integration (2017–19); Combined Air Operations Centre (2017); Air Warfare Centre RAAF (2016); Aerospace Operational Support Group RAAF (2014–16); No. 42 Wing RAAF (2008–10); No. 6 Squadron RAAF (2006–08)
- Conflicts: Gulf War; War in Afghanistan; War against the Islamic State
- Awards: Officer of the Order of Australia; Distinguished Service Medal

Air Vice Marshal Stephen Leslie Meredith, AO, DSM is a retired senior officer of the Royal Australian Air Force (RAAF). He joined the RAAF as a navigator in 1986. He has commanded No. 6 Squadron RAAF (2006–08), No. 42 Wing RAAF (2008–10), the Aerospace Operational Support Group RAAF (2014–16) and the Combined Air Operations Centre (2017), and has served on operations in the Gulf War, War in Afghanistan and in the International military intervention against ISIL. He served as Head Force Integration from 2017 to 2019, before being appointed Deputy Chief of Air Force from July 2019 to January 2023.

== RAAF career ==
Meredith joined the Royal Australian Air Force (RAAF) as an officer cadet in 1986 and trained as a navigator. On the completion of his training, he was posted to No. 37 Squadron RAAF at RAAF Base Richmond, serving aboard Lockheed C-130 Hercules transport aircraft. In December 1990, Meredith was among a detachment from No. 37 Squadron deployed in support of Australia's contribution to the Gulf War. Following his return to Australia in 1991, he completed a conversion course on the General Dynamics F-111 Aardvark and was posted to No. 1 Squadron RAAF at RAAF Base Amberley.

Meredith was posted as an instructor navigator in No. 6 Squadron RAAF from 1995 and, on promotion to squadron leader, was assigned to the Defence Material Organisation in 1998. He returned to No. 6 Squadron as executive officer in 1999, graduated from the Australian Command and Staff College in 2002, and was posted as staff officer to the Deputy Chief of Air Force. Promoted wing commander, he was made deputy director of Combat Enablers in the Capability Development Group in 2003. He was next appointed executive officer of No. 82 Wing RAAF in January 2006, before assuming command of No. 6 Squadron from December that year. While in command of No. 6 Squadron, Meredith oversaw the retirement of the F-111G.

Promoted group captain in 2008, Meredith was appointed Officer Commanding No. 42 Wing RAAF. In this role, he was part of the team that introduced the Boeing E-7A Wedgetail into Australian service. Following wing command, Meredith deployed to the Middle East as a Battle Director in the Combined Air Operations Centre as part of Operation Slipper, Australia's contribution to the War in Afghanistan. He returned to Australia as chief of staff to the Chief of the Defence Force, completed the Defence and Strategic Studies Course at the Australian Defence College in 2013 and, promoted air commodore, was appointed Deputy Air Commander. He was then posted as Commander Aerospace Operational Support Group RAAF in December 2014 and as the first commander of the Air Warfare Centre RAAF from January 2016. In recognition of his "inspirational leadership, remarkable managerial skill, and extraordinary systems thinking" in these roles, Meredith was appointed a Member of the Order of Australia in the 2016 Australia Day Honours.

In January 2017, Meredith redeployed to the Middle East as Director of the Combined Air Operations Centre. His "distinguished leadership" during the six-month posting was recognised with the award of the Distinguished Service Medal in the 2018 Queen's Birthday Honours. Following his return to Australia, Meredith was promoted air vice marshal and appointed Head Force Integration in the Vice Chief of the Defence Force Group in December 2017. After eighteen months in this joint service role, he succeeded Air Vice Marshal Gavin Turnbull as Deputy Chief of Air Force on 1 July 2019. Meredith relinquished the position in January 2023 and, for his "distinguished service" in this and previous posts, he was promoted to Officer of the Order of Australia in the 2023 King's Birthday Honours. The citation for the award described Meredith as "an Aviator of rare skill and ability" who had "been masterful at managing governance across the Royal Australian Air Force".

== Personal life ==
Meredith is married to Sue and has two children. He is an enthusiastic fisherman and a fan of the Brumbies rugby team.

Military offices
Preceded by Air Vice Marshal Gavin Turnbull	Deputy Chief of Air Force; 2019–2023	Succeeded by Air Vice Marshal Glen Braz
Preceded by Rear Admiral Pete Quinn	Head Force Integration; 2017–2019	Succeeded by Major General Kathryn Toohey
