= HQAC =

HQAC may refer to:

- Headquarters Air Command of the following air forces:
  - RAF Air Command (Royal Air Force)
  - RAAF Air Command (Royal Australian Air Force)
- Headquarters Air Cadets, a British youth organisation sponsored by the Ministry of Defence and the Royal Air Force
