= Joe Iervasi =

Royal Australian Air Force officer

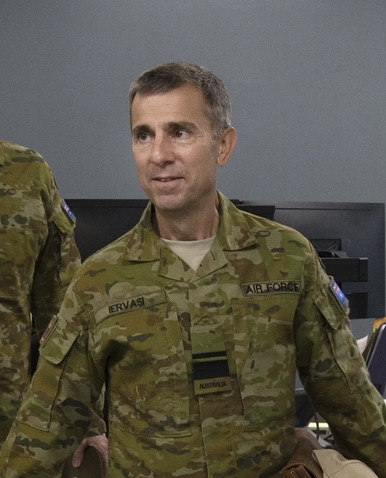
- Iervasi in May 2019
- Born: 1967 (age 58–59); Sydney, New South Wales
- Military career
- Allegiance: Australia
- Branch: Royal Australian Air Force
- Service years: 1985–2023
- Rank: Air Vice-Marshal
- Nickname: "Vinny"
- Commands: Air Command (2019–22); Joint Task Force 633 (2019); Air Warfare Centre (2017–18); 609th Combined Air Operations Centre (2014); No. 81 Wing RAAF (2011–12); No. 3 Squadron RAAF (2005–08)
- Conflicts: Bosnian War; Operation Deny Flight; War in Afghanistan; War against the Islamic State
- Awards: Member of the Order of Australia; Conspicuous Service Cross

Air Vice-Marshal Vincent Joseph Iervasi, AM, CSC (born 1967) is a retired senior officer of the Royal Australian Air Force (RAAF). He joined the RAAF in 1985 and gained his pilot's wings in 1989. He deployed to Bosnia and Herzegovina on Operation Deny Flight in 1995, Qatar in support of Operation Slipper in 2014, and to Al Minhad Air Base in support of Operations Okra and Highroad in 2019. He commanded No. 3 Squadron RAAF (2005–08), No. 81 Wing RAAF (2011–12), the 609th Combined Air Operations Centre (2014) and the Air Warfare Centre (2017–18). He was Commander Joint Task Force 633 from January to June 2019 and served as Air Commander Australia from 2019 to 2022.

== Early and personal life ==
Iervasi was born in Sydney, New South Wales. He has a lifelong interest in flying and aviation – as an adolescent, he would build Airfix aircraft models and affix them to his bedroom ceiling. He did not consider a career in the Royal Australian Air Force (RAAF), however, until a high school friend suggested they visit a recruiting office. Iervasi was accepted and joined the RAAF as an officer cadet in 1985.

Iervasi is married to Donna Allen, with whom he has twin daughters.

== RAAF career ==
Following his initial officer training, Iervasi graduated from the University of New South Wales with a Bachelor of Science and was then posted for flying training. He gained his pilot's wings in 1989 and, following conversion to the McDonnell Douglas F/A-18 Hornet in 1991, he was posted to No. 3 Squadron RAAF at RAAF Base Williamtown. This was followed by an exchange posting to the Royal Air Force's No. 5 (Army Cooperation) Squadron in the United Kingdom. In 1995, as part of the exchange, Iervasi flew the Panavia Tornado F3 in support of Operation Deny Flight, helping to enforce the no-fly zone over Bosnia and Herzegovina.

Following his return to Australia, Iervasi served as a flight commander in No. 77 Squadron RAAF and then in No. 75 Squadron RAAF. He was part of the inaugural Australian Command and Staff College course at Weston Creek in 2001, graduating with a Masters of Management in Defence Studies from the affiliated University of Canberra, and was posted to the Capability Systems office in RAAF Headquarters as Deputy Director Firepower. Iervasi was involved in a number of major capital equipment projects in this role, which included significant systems and armament upgrades to the F/A-18 Hornet as part of the Hornet Upgrade Program. He returned to RAAF Base Williamtown in 2005 as Senior Operations Officer in No. 81 Wing RAAF and, that December, assumed command of No. 3 Squadron. In September 2006, Iervasi flew Federal Treasurer Peter Costello on a combat training exercise to demonstrate the upgrades to the F/A-18 Hornet; the pair reached speeds of 850 kilometres per hour (530 mph) and six times the force of gravity, and Costello was left with a bloodied right ear (ostensibly from a helmet injury). Iervasi relinquished command of the squadron in December 2008 and, in the 2009 Queen's Birthday Honours, was awarded a Medal of the Order of Australia for his command of No. 3 Squadron and "meritorious service in the development of Australia's air combat capability".

Promoted to group captain in January 2009, Iervasi was appointed chief of staff of Air Combat Group RAAF. He completed the Defence and Strategic Studies Course in 2010, graduating with a Graduate Diploma of Strategic Studies and the Field Marshal Sir Thomas Blamey Award, and was appointed Officer Commanding No. 81 Wing RAAF from that December. As Task Unit 664.2.1, Iervasi commanded surveillance and fighter aircraft from the wing as part of the security and counter-terrorism measures for the 2011 Commonwealth Heads of Government Meeting in Perth. He relinquished command of the wing in December 2012, was appointed chief of staff to the Vice Chief of the Defence Force in January 2013 and, promoted to air commodore, was deployed to Al Udeid Air Base in Qatar as director of the 609th Combined Air Operations Centre in January 2014. Iervasi returned to Australia in July 2014 as Director General Air and, in the 2016 Queen's Birthday Honours, was appointed a Member of the Order of Australia for his "exceptional service in air combat capability development and military operations". He was next appointed commander of the nascent Air Warfare Centre from December 2016. The centre had been established earlier that year, succeeding the Aerospace Operational Support Group RAAF in providing operational support to RAAF operations and to foster joint integration.

Iervasi was promoted to air vice-marshal in December 2018 and, the following month, deployed to Al Minhad Air Base in the United Arab Emirates as Commander Joint Task Force 633. Iervasi held command responsibility for all Australian forces in the Middle East Area of Operations and, in particular, Operations Okra and Highroad. He remained in the Middle East until June 2019 and, for his "outstanding achievement... exceptional operational oversight, [and] critical leadership" as Commander Joint Task Force 633, was awarded the Conspicuous Service Cross in the 2020 Queen's Birthday Honours. On his return to Australia, Iervasi succeeded Air Vice-Marshal Steve Roberton as Air Commander Australia, with responsibility for more than 10,000 personnel and the operational capability of the RAAF. After almost three years in the role, Iervasi handed over Air Command to Air Vice-Marshal Darren Goldie in April 2022 and subsequently retired from the RAAF. By the time of his retirement, Iervasi had logged more than 3,000 hours flying.

== Post-military career ==
Iervasi was briefly, in February 2024, appointed an Assistant Inspector-General of the Australian Defence Force to support an independent inquiry into the fatal crash of an MRH-90 Taipan helicopter during Exercise Talisman Sabre the previous year, which killed four crew; he was replaced by Air Vice-Marshal Geoffrey Harland in March. That May, Iervasi was elected National President of the RAAF Association.

Military offices
Preceded by Air Vice-Marshal Steve Roberton	Air Commander Australia; 2019–2022	Succeeded by Air Vice-Marshal Darren Goldie
Preceded by Rear Admiral Jaimie Hatcher	Commander Joint Task Force 633; January–July 2019	Succeeded by Rear Admiral Mark Hill
