= George Jones (RAAF officer) =

Royal Australian Air Force chief

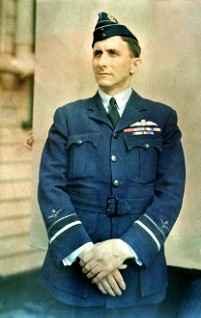
- Air Vice-Marshal George Jones, 1942
- Born: 18 October 1896; Rushworth, Victoria
- Died: 24 August 1992 (aged 95); Melbourne, Victoria
- Military career
- Allegiance: Australia
- Service/branch: Royal Australian Air Force
- Service years: 1912–52
- Rank: Air Marshal
- Nicknames: "Jonah"; "Yellow Jones"
- Unit: No. 4 Squadron AFC (1918–19)
- Commands: Directorate of Training (1931–36); Chief of the Air Staff (1942–52)
- Conflicts: World War I; Gallipoli Campaign; Western Front; World War II; Pacific War; South West Pacific Theatre; Malayan Emergency; Korean War
- Awards: Knight Commander of the Order of the British Empire; Companion of the Order of the Bath; Distinguished Flying Cross
- Other work: Director of Coordination, Commonwealth Aircraft Corporation (1952–57)

Air Marshal Sir George Jones, KBE, CB, DFC (18 October 1896 – 24 August 1992) was a senior commander in the Royal Australian Air Force (RAAF). He rose from private soldier in World War I to air marshal in 1948, and served as Chief of the Air Staff from 1942 to 1952, the longest continuous tenure of any RAAF chief. Jones was a surprise appointee to the Air Force's top role, and his achievements in the position were coloured by a divisive relationship during World War II with his nominal subordinate, the head of RAAF Command, Air Vice-Marshal William Bostock.

During World War I, Jones saw action as an infantryman in the Gallipoli Campaign of 1915, transferring to the Australian Flying Corps a year later. Originally a mechanic, he undertook flying training in 1917 and was posted to a fighter squadron in France. He achieved seven victories to become an ace, and was awarded the Distinguished Flying Cross. After a short spell in civilian life following World War I, he joined the newly formed RAAF in 1921, and rose steadily through training and personnel commands prior to World War II.

Jones did not actively seek the position of Chief of the Air Staff before being appointed in 1942, and his conflict with Bostock—with whom he had been friends for 20 years—was partly the result of a divided command structure, which neither man had any direct role in shaping. After World War II, Jones had overall responsibility for transforming what was then the world's fourth largest air force into a peacetime service that was also able to meet overseas commitments in Malaya and Korea. Following his retirement from the RAAF, he continued to serve in the aircraft industry and later ran unsuccessfully for political office. He was knighted in 1953.

== Early life ==
I didn't give myself any airs and it was very hard for me to think I was different from a lot of other people. I couldn't be seen to be different because I remembered my humble beginnings ...

— George Jones, quoted in 1992

George Jones was born on 18 October 1896 near Rushworth, a rural community in Victoria. The date appearing on his birth certificate was the day of registration, 22 November. His father, a miner, had died in an accident three months before the birth, leaving his family in poverty. The youngest of ten children, Jones was brought up in a strict Methodist household and for his entire life rarely touched alcohol. He attended Rushworth State School, and completed his education at the age of 14 with a Certificate of Merit.

Following his schooling, Jones took an apprenticeship as a carpenter before moving to Melbourne, where he became a motor mechanic. He worked in several garages before commencing a part-time course in fitting and turning at the Working Men's College of Melbourne. His college studies were curtailed by the outbreak of World War I, by which time he had accumulated three years part-time military service, firstly in cadets and later in a militia unit, the 29th Light Horse Regiment.

== World War I ==
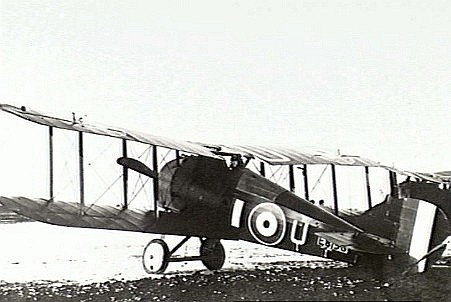
Snipe of No. 4 Squadron AFC, c. 1918

In May 1915 Jones joined the Australian Imperial Force, embarking for Egypt in August with the 9th Light Horse Regiment. He landed at Gallipoli the following month and served there until the end of the campaign in December. His experiences at Gallipoli, especially witnessing the death by enemy fire of one of his friends, affected him deeply and he suffered from headaches and nightmares for years afterwards. After briefly transferring to the Imperial Camel Corps, Jones applied to join the Australian Flying Corps (AFC) in October 1916, taking a drop in rank from corporal to private to do so.

Jones became an air mechanic in No. 1 Squadron AFC (known as No. 67 Squadron Royal Flying Corps by the British), before being accepted for flying training in England. He gained his wings on 22 November 1917 and was posted to No. 4 Squadron AFC (also known as No. 71 Squadron RFC) as a second lieutenant in January the following year. Flying Sopwith Camels and Snipes on the Western Front, Jones finished the war a captain and an ace, with seven aerial victories from 150 patrols. He was badly injured by a bullet wound and petrol burns in combat with a German fighter in March 1918, and did not return to his unit for three months. On 29 October 1918 he achieved two kills in one engagement, at Tournai, in what is frequently described as "one of the greatest air battles of the war". Amid a confrontation involving over 75 Allied and German fighters, Jones led his patrol of three Snipes in a dive on ten Fokkers, destroying a brace of enemy aircraft in the attack. He was decorated with the Distinguished Flying Cross for displaying "the greatest daring and ability in aerial fighting"; the award was promulgated in the London Gazette on 5 April 1919.

== Inter-war years ==
Jones remained with the Australian Flying Corps until June 1919, as part of the British occupation forces in Germany. After returning to Australia he worked as a turner in Melbourne. He married Muriel Cronan, a clerk who also played piano professionally, on 15 November 1919. They had met before the war and kept in touch throughout Jones' overseas postings. The couple's first child, Ronald, arrived on 2 October 1920. A second son, Ian, would be born on 26 June 1934. Jones was described by family members as being a somewhat distant husband and father, dedicated to his career and rarely given to obvious displays of emotion.

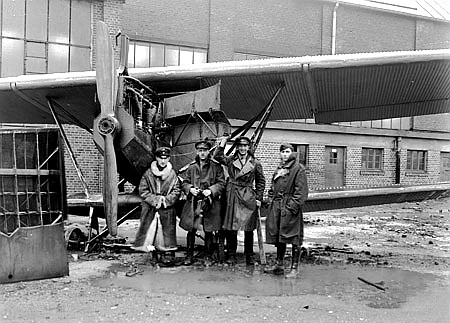
Captains Jones (far right) and Roy King (second right), with other pilots of No. 4 Squadron AFC, British Occupation forces in Germany, December 1918

Encouraged by a fellow No. 4 Squadron veteran, Harry Cobby, Jones applied to join the new Australian Air Force on 22 March 1921 (the prefix "Royal" was added that August). His rank was flying officer, one below the equivalent of his AFC rank of captain. Another Australian pilot joining the fledgling Air Force was William (Bill) Bostock, who had been a lieutenant in World War I. The pair became firm friends, Bostock acting as something of a mentor to the younger officer. Jones was promoted to flight lieutenant on 1 July 1923. Nicknamed "Jonah", he was also known as "Yellow Jones" in his early days with the RAAF, not through any perceived lack of moral fibre but as a result of the lingering effects on his skin of jaundice, contracted while a soldier at Gallipoli.

Posted to RAAF Point Cook, Victoria, Jones was put in charge of the Motor Transport Repair Section and made acting (later permanent) Officer Commanding Workshops. He was highly regarded for his technical and administrative ability but rated only "average" in command and dealing with personnel. In 1926 he took up flight instruction and within a year had been graded a 1A Flying Instructor. He was promoted to squadron leader on 31 March 1927 and given command of the Flying Squadron at No. 1 Flying Training School (No. 1 FTS). Jones spent two years in Britain from 1928, attending the Royal Air Force Staff College, Andover, and graduating top of his class at the RAF's Central Flying School. He later recalled of this posting, "The social life was new to me, as was the etiquette ... I learned as fast as I could, but I have no doubt that I unwittingly committed many a social blunder." As the RAAF's senior officer in the UK, Jones had expected to be invited to accompany the airship R101 on its maiden flight to India in October 1930. Instead another Australian officer was nominated to make the trip, and Jones avoided the disaster which killed 48 of the 54 passengers and crew.

Returning to Australia in October 1930, Jones was made Chief Flying Instructor at Point Cook and Officer Commanding No. 1 FTS. He became Director of Training at RAAF Headquarters, Melbourne, in November 1931. On 2 April 1932, he was taking off from Mascot, New South Wales, in a de Havilland Moth when he struck the perimeter fence and crashed, resulting in major damage to the aircraft and injuries to himself and his passenger. His performance in the early 1930s was highly regarded by his superiors, regularly being assessed as "above average" or "exceptional". From late 1934 to early 1935, he collaborated with the Director of Equipment, George Mackinolty, on an investigation into the state of aircraft production in Australia to highlight shortfalls in local defence in the face of possible future conflict with Japan. Though the report was reviewed enthusiastically by the Air Member for Personnel, Bill Anderson, it apparently went no further in the chain of command and thus was effectively ignored. In January 1936, Jones was promoted to wing commander and appointed Director of Personnel Services.

== World War II ==
=== Rise to Chief of the Air Staff ===
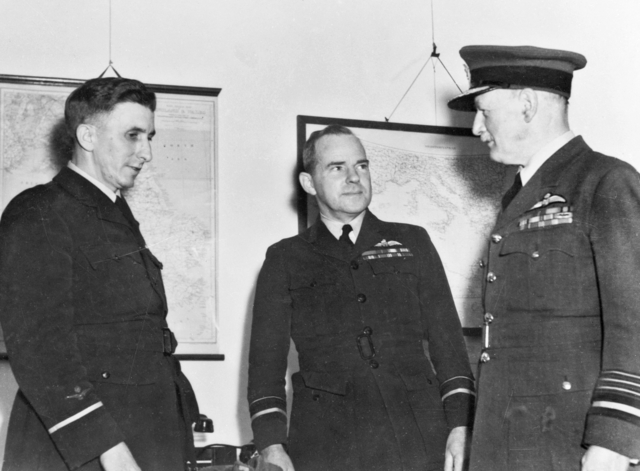
Newly appointed Chief of the Air Staff (CAS) Air Vice Marshal George Jones (left) with Air Vice-Marshal Bill Bostock (centre) and outgoing CAS Air Chief Marshal Sir Charles Burnett, May 1942

Shortly after the outbreak of World War II, on 1 December 1939, Jones was raised to temporary group captain. In March 1940, he returned to the position of Director of Training and assumed responsibility for Australia's part in the Empire Air Training Scheme (EATS), establishing many schools, acquiring hundreds of aircraft, and overseeing the training of thousands of airmen. The RAAF's Central Flying School was reformed in April 1940 to meet the vital requirement for more flying instructors, whose numbers would grow from 16 in the first year of the war to 3,600 by 1945. His performance in this role led to Jones being promoted to acting air commodore on 21 February 1941, and appointed a Commander of the Order of the British Empire in the 1942 New Year Honours for "diligence, devotion to duty and perseverance of outstanding merit".

On 5 May 1942, Jones was appointed Chief of the Air Staff (CAS), the RAAF's senior position. He was considered an unlikely choice, a contemporary newspaper called him "the darkest of dark horses". Jones was still only a substantive wing commander and acting air commodore when he succeeded to the role, leapfrogging several more senior officers including Bostock, now an air vice-marshal and Deputy Chief of the Air Staff. Bostock, described in the official history of the pre-war RAAF as "among the Air Force's best brains" at the time, considered himself the leading candidate for the position, and so did Jones. A suggestion arose that Jones' selection was a mistake, based on the government's reading of an organisation chart that implied he was the RAAF's most senior officer after Bostock, when in fact he was ranked six places below.

Other potential appointees had included Air Marshal Richard Williams and Air Vice-Marshal Peter Drummond, but Williams had been out of favour since his dismissal from the position of CAS in the wake of the Ellington Report criticising RAAF flying safety in 1939 and Drummond was not released from his position as Deputy Air Officer Commanding-in-Chief RAF Middle East. Bostock was the first choice of the incumbent CAS, Air Chief Marshal Sir Charles Burnett, but the latter's ill-concealed contempt for John Curtin's Federal Labor government helped ensure that his preference was ignored. Although he admitted to being "stunned" by the decision, Jones himself had the ambition and a reasonable expectation of becoming CAS at some point in his career; it simply happened "much sooner than I anticipated". Jones had proved his organisational abilities directing EATS, and believed that this was a significant factor in his appointment. His working class origin has also been cited as contributing to his suitability to a Labor government.

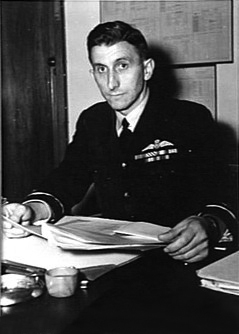
Jones shortly after he was appointed CAS, May 1942

=== Divided command ===
Passed over as CAS, Bostock subsequently became Air Officer Commanding (AOC) RAAF Command, which placed him in charge of Australian air operations in the Pacific. Jones' role, in contrast, was primarily administrative, that of "raising, training and maintaining" the service. Though the CAS was de jure head of the RAAF, Jones' new rank of air vice-marshal was the same as Bostock's. In the words of Air Force historian Alan Stephens, "Jones was the head of his service, but he was neither unambiguously its senior officer, nor presiding over a unified command ... The system of divided command ... was not an ideal arrangement, but with men of goodwill it could have worked. Regrettably Bostock and Jones were not of that mind ..."

Friction between the two senior officers over the command structure rapidly deteriorated into what the official history of the RAAF in World War II described as a state of "complete obduracy", and remained so until the end of the war. As a direct report to the USAAF's Lieutenant-General George Kenney, commander of Allied Air Forces in the South West Pacific Area (SWPA), Bostock was able to ignore many directives from Jones, his nominal superior in the RAAF. Jones nevertheless continued to assert his authority over Bostock's supplies of manpower and equipment.

In March 1943 Jones proposed that he take over responsibility for air operations in defence of the Australian mainland but General Douglas MacArthur, Supreme Commander SWPA, refused to countenance it. The next month, with the support of the Australian Air Board, Jones tried to remove Bostock from RAAF Command and replace him with Air Commodore Joe Hewitt, AOC No. 9 Operational Group (No. 9 OG). Bostock appealed to Kenney, who advised Jones that he was opposed to any such change of command and threatened to escalate the matter to the Australian government. MacArthur subsequently told Curtin that Hewitt "was not an adequate replacement" for Bostock, and the matter was dropped. Six months later Jones would sack Hewitt over morale issues in No. 9 OG raised during the offensive on Rabaul; Kenney called Hewitt's removal "bad news".

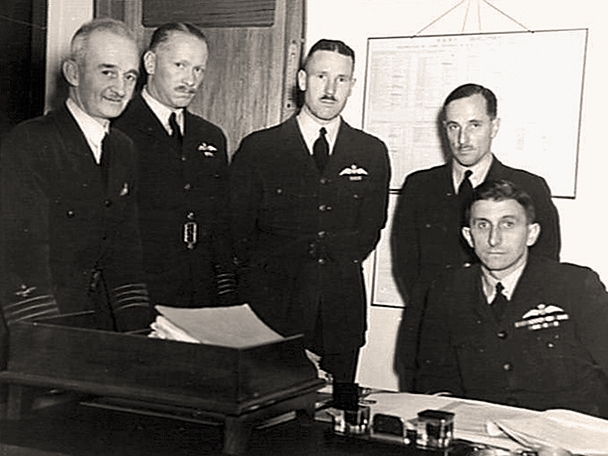
Jones (right) with members of HQ Allied Air Forces SWPA, including Group Captains Allan Walters (second left) and Val Hancock (centre) and Air Commodore Joe Hewitt (second right), 1942

Jones himself came under threat of transfer or subordination in April 1943 when the Federal government began moves to unite the Air Force's command by creating an overarching Air Officer Commanding RAAF position that would have effectively replaced Jones as CAS and also been senior to Bostock. Drummond was again approached but once more the British Air Ministry refused to release him, having selected him for an Air Council post. MacArthur rejected two other RAF candidates, and the plan was held over. In the King's Birthday Honours that June, Jones was appointed a Companion of the Order of the Bath.

By June 1944 the Jones–Bostock conflict and the anomalous division of administrative and operational responsibilities again led the Australian government to consider the appointment of a new commander senior to both officers. Air Marshal Sir Keith Park, the New Zealand-born AOC of No. 11 Group RAF during the Battle of Britain, was sought for the position but negotiations were broken off when MacArthur advised that it was too late to make such a change and that the problem had now gone "quiet". That it was far from over was apparent in a series of cables exchanged between the two air vice-marshals in January 1945. Jones sent a signal to Bostock complaining of the latter's "insubordinate tone" and "repeated attempts to usurp authority of this Headquarters". Bostock replied that as AOC RAAF Command he was "responsible to Commander, Allied Air Forces, and not, repeat not, subordinate to you", and that he would "continue to take the strongest exception to your unwarranted and uninformed interference". Despite such acrimony, the command structure remained unchanged for the rest of the war.

Responsible as CAS for building up Australia's air combat assets, in 1943 Jones had given an assurance to the Australian government that he could maintain a force of 73 squadrons, despite Kenney's prediction that even the RAAF's then-currently approved strength of 45 squadrons was beyond its capacity. In any event, by the end of the war Jones had expanded the RAAF to 70 squadrons in the Pacific and Europe, including several heavy bomber units. One of his most controversial decisions of the war was during the invasion of Tarakan in May 1945 when he grounded Australian B-24 Liberator squadrons scheduled to take part in the attack, due to their crews having exceeded their monthly quota of flying hours. Bostock was not consulted, and said that he would have thankfully "fallen through a crack in the boards on the deck" as he watched the attacking formations from a U.S. warship, minus the expected RAAF aircraft. Kenney sympathised with him; he once commented in his diary that "Jones and Bostock ... fight each other harder than the Japs".

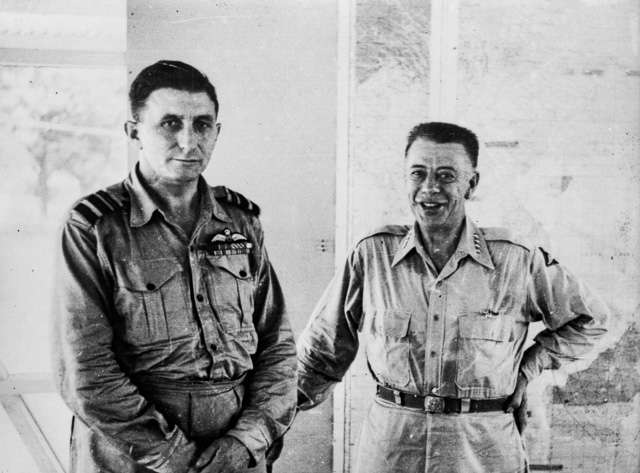
Jones (left) and Lieutenant General George Kenney (right) in Manila, July 1945

=== "Morotai Mutiny" ===
Towards the end of the war Jones intervened in the so-called "Morotai Mutiny", when senior pilots in the Australian First Tactical Air Force (No. 1 TAF) proffered their resignations rather than carry on attacking what they saw as unimportant targets. Jones personally interviewed all but one of the officers involved, later declaring, "I believed them all to be sincere in what they were stating and what they had attempted to do ... Yes, sincerely held beliefs, no matter how ill-founded, coupled possibly with a rather exaggerated sense of national duty."

Kenney also insisted on speaking to the pilots himself, overriding Jones' protestations that it was an internal RAAF matter, and threatened to appear on behalf of the pilots should they be court-martialled. Jones sacked Cobby, the Air Officer Commanding No. 1 TAF, along with two of Cobby's staff. In what may have been a reaction to Kenney's threat, Jones insisted that the subsequent inquiry before Justice John Vincent Barry focus not only on the attempted resignations but on reports of alcohol trafficking on Morotai. Though no action was taken against the pilots over the mutiny directly, two of the RAAF's best-known aces, Group Captain Clive Caldwell and Wing Commander Bobby Gibbes, were court-martialled for their involvement in the alcohol racket and reduced in rank. Although Barry did not find it a significant factor, the Jones–Bostock conflict was also blamed for contributing to the poor morale that precipitated the "mutiny". One of the other participants, Wing Commander Kenneth Ranger, told the inquiry: "I deplore the fighting and wrangling between them which is common knowledge throughout the Air Force. Every week there are instances of it."

== Post-war career ==
=== "Interim Air Force" ===
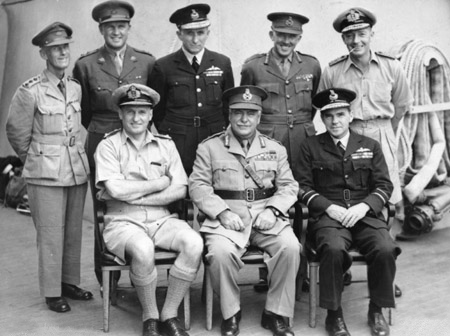
Jones (back, middle) and Bostock (front, right) with General Sir Thomas Blamey (front, centre) and other Australian delegates at the Japanese surrender aboard USS Missouri, September 1945

Along with Bostock, Jones represented the RAAF at the Japanese surrender aboard USS Missouri in September 1945. With Jones' concurrence, Bostock and other senior commanders were summarily retired in 1946, in Bostock's case for "inability to work in harmony with certain other high ranking RAAF officers". The CAS oversaw planning for the demobilisation of thousands of RAAF personnel and the creation of a peacetime service, known as the "Interim Air Force". When he was eventually promoted to air marshal in 1948 the RAAF was made up of approximately 8,000 staff, compared to 175,000—the world's fourth largest air force—he had commanded in 1945 as an air vice-marshal. Believing that wastage was reaching a critical point, Jones proposed recruiting women into a new service to replace the Women's Auxiliary Australian Air Force that had been disbanded in September 1946. Blocked initially by the Labor government of the day, it came into being in 1950 as the Women's Royal Australian Air Force, following the election of Robert Menzies' Liberal Party in December 1949.

Concurrently with demobilisation, Jones shaped the RAAF's "Plan D", adopted in 1947. It outlined the service's post-war organisation and requirements, which included 16 squadrons flying technologically advanced aircraft. This basic structure remained in place for the next 20 years. In 1949, Jones visited the UK with a team of advisors and recommended the English Electric Canberra jet to replace the RAAF's Avro Lincoln piston-engined bombers. Entering service in 1953, the Canberras ultimately equipped three Squadrons, operating with distinction in the Vietnam War and continuing to fly until 1982. Other enduring types purchased under Jones' tenure as CAS included the CAC Sabre, P-2 Neptune and CAC Winjeel. Jones still enjoyed flying and made an effort to pilot each new type as it entered service, including the de Havilland Vampire jet, but his irregular turns in the cockpit meant that his skills were generally found wanting.

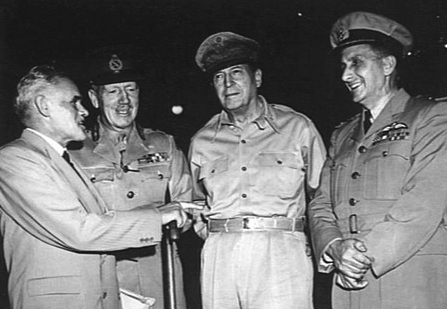
Lieutenant General Sir Horace Robertson (second left), General Douglas MacArthur (second right) and Air Marshal Jones (far right) in Japan after the outbreak of the Korean War in 1950

=== Overseas commitments and retirement from RAAF ===
When Australia committed forces to the Malayan Emergency in April 1950, Jones grouped the requisite RAAF assets under one overarching organisation, No. 90 (Composite) Wing, to ensure they would operate with some autonomy rather than be dispersed throughout other Allied services as had been the case in World War II, when Australian units and personnel based in Britain had been absorbed by the RAF. He also proposed that the officer commanding all Commonwealth air force units should be from the RAAF; this was agreed by the British Air Ministry, and the position later gave valuable experience to two future Chiefs of the Air Staff, Air Vice-Marshals Frederick Scherger and Val Hancock. Jones allocated No. 77 Squadron, then based in Japan as part of British Commonwealth Occupation Force, to the United Nations Command when the Korean War broke out. Prime Minister Menzies rang Jones at home on Saturday, 1 July 1950, requesting a squadron and the unit went into action the following day.

Almost immediately that Menzies' Liberal Party replaced the Chifley Labor government at the end of 1949, it had begun to investigate possible replacements (largely from the RAF) for the incumbent CAS, eventually deciding on Air Marshal (later Air Chief Marshal) Sir Donald Hardman. Jones was informed of his retirement, which he claimed to have been expecting, in December 1951. In a farewell speech at the Australian Club in Melbourne, attended by Menzies, Jones said that organising EATS and expanding the Air Force in the South West Pacific had been his greatest achievements. His official departure from RAAF was on 22 February 1952. Menzies sent him a letter thanking him for his "valuable contribution", which would "long be remembered".

== Later life ==
Following his departure from the Air Force in 1952, Jones became Director of Coordination with the Commonwealth Aircraft Corporation (CAC) and member of the board of Ansett Transport Industries. In the 1953 New Year Honours, he was appointed a Knight Commander of the Order of the British Empire for his military service. He retired from the CAC directorship in 1957 but remained on the Ansett board until the early 1970s.

Jones pursued a political career in parallel to his aviation industry work, unsuccessfully standing for Liberal Party pre-selection in the seat of Flinders in 1952. In 1958, he left the Liberals in favour of the Labor Party, contesting the seat of Henty at the 1961 federal election. He switched parties as his views were too leftist for the Liberals, declaring "They got rather nasty with me and wouldn't give me a fair go, so I resigned and joined the Labor Party". He pursued an energetic campaign in Henty, but lost to his Liberal opponent by fewer than 3,000 primary votes. Jones left the Labor Party in 1965 due to dissatisfaction with its aviation policy. In 1967, he contested the Corio by-election as a candidate of the Liberal Reform Group, running as an opponent of the Vietnam War. He was unsuccessful, polling 1.8 percent of the primary vote.

Jones also evinced an interest in unidentified flying objects, having first encountered unexplained aerial phenomena at Warrnambool, Victoria, in 1930. He reported witnessing another UFO in October 1957, but admitted that he was "loath to talk about it publicly lest people should think I was either an incompetent witness or getting a little screwy in the head". In the mid-1960s he patronised the Commonwealth Aerial Phenomena Investigation Organisation and joined the Victorian UFO Research Society. Jones published his autobiography, From Private to Air Marshal, in 1988. He was Australia's last surviving World War I ace when he died in Melbourne on 24 August 1992, aged 95.

== Legacy ==
He was my friend for 20 years ... he expected to get the job, and the moment I got the job instead of him, his attitude changed.

— George Jones on Bill Bostock's reaction to Jones' appointment as CAS

Jones' ten years as CAS constitutes the longest continuous term of any RAAF chief. Despite his longevity in the position, he is still primarily known for two events early in his tenure, the surprise circumstance of his appointment, and his feud with Bill Bostock that lasted until the end of World War II. The conflict between its two senior officers has been described by David Horner as "disastrous" for the RAAF, and by Alan Stephens as having "diminished its standing" in the eyes of its Allies. Jones stated in his autobiography that he had never intrigued for the role of CAS and would have worked loyally for Bostock if the latter had been appointed.

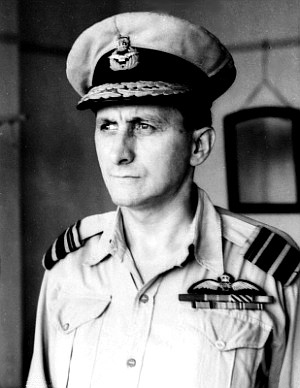
Air Vice-Marshal George Jones pictured shortly after the end of World War II, August 1945

Beyond these controversies, Jones significantly influenced the Air Force's development during and after the war. He was honoured for his work running EATS in 1940–1942 and has received credit as CAS for building up the RAAF's strength to 70 squadrons by 1945. After the war he played a personal part in improving education within the service, including the establishment of RAAF College, along similar lines to the Royal Military College, Duntroon, and the Royal Australian Naval College, as well as RAAF Staff College. He encouraged local industry to design and build trainer aircraft for the RAAF and produce more sophisticated combat aircraft under licence from overseas manufacturers. This led to the Winjeel basic trainer and Australian industry co-partnership in the production of the CAC Sabre and Canberra jets; such local participation has continued to figure in major RAAF aircraft acquisitions. One of his last directions as CAS was the formation of RAAF Museum at Point Cook, where it is still based.

Jones refused to update the command structure of the Air Force from one based on region to one of function, something his successor, Hardman, would accomplish, and has been criticised for a systemic resistance to change. Jones was described in Horner's The Commanders as "a steady, sincere but colourless leader". Stephens found him "a good and decent man, who had overcome considerable personal hardship in his youth to achieve exceptional professional success" but "neither an inspiring leader, nor a notable thinker". Nevertheless, his Plan D for the RAAF's post-war organisation remained the service's blueprint until the early 1970s.

== Notes ==
Military offices
Preceded by Air Chief Marshal Sir Charles Burnett	Chief of the Air Staff; 1942–1952	Succeeded by Air Marshal Sir Donald Hardman
