= John Quaife =

Australian air marshal

- Born: 2 June 1955 (age 71); Melbourne, Victoria
- Military career
- Allegiance: Australia
- Branch: Royal Australian Air Force
- Service years: 1981–2008
- Rank: Air Vice Marshal
- Commands: RAAF Air Command (2005–07); Air Combat Group (2002–04); No. 77 Squadron (1996–98)
- Conflicts: War in Afghanistan; Operation Slipper; Iraq War; Operation Catalyst
- Awards: Member of the Order of Australia

Air Vice Marshal Alfred John Quaife, AM (born 2 June 1955) is a retired senior officer of the Royal Australian Air Force (RAAF).

== Early life ==
John Quaife was born on 2 June 1955 in Melbourne. Prior to joining the RAAF, he graduated from La Trobe University.

== Service history ==
Quaife graduated from No. 112 Pilots Course in September 1981. After an initial posting to the Strike Reconnaissance Group, and a brief tour flying Canberra aircraft, his operational career has focussed on fighter operations; Quaife's initial fighter training was conducted on Mirage IIIO aircraft.

In 1987, Quaife completed F/A-18 Hornet conversion training, and subsequently served with No. 2 Operational Conversion Unit, No 77. Squadron and No. 75 Squadron. He is a Fighter Combat Instructor with in excess of 2000 hours fighter experience and from 1996 to 1998, Quaife commanded No. 77 Squadron.

Between 1992 and 1994, Quaife served as a fast jet specialist officer in the Force Development Directorate of the Australian Defence Headquarters, primarily in developing the proposal for the acquisition of Hawk aircraft for Lead-in Fighter training. In 1999, Air Vice Marshal Quaife returned to that headquarters as the Director of Aerospace Combat Development.

During 2001, Quaife directed the Air Combat Group project. In this role he directed a small team that planned the amalgamation of RAAF fast jet operations into a single Force Element Group. In January 2002, he was appointed to command the newly created Air Combat Group. During his tenure, Air Combat Group units deployed for Operations Slipper and Falconer.

In January 2004, Quaife was appointed the RAAF's first permanent Joint Force Air Component Commander. In this appointment he was responsible for developing Air Operations Centre functionality within the Australian Theatre air component. Between December 2004 and April 2005, Air Vice Marshal Quaife served as the director of the United States Combined Air Operations Centre, where he was responsible for orchestrating coalition air power in both Iraq and Afghanistan.

Quaife was appointed a Member of the Order of Australia in the 2004 Australia Day Honours. He was promoted to the rank of air vice marshal in June 2005, and appointed as Air Commander Australia. In August 2007, he accepted the appointment of Head of Capability Systems. He held this position until his retirement from the Air Force in 2008.

Military offices
Preceded by Rear Admiral Matt Tripovich	Head of Capability Systems; 2007–2008	Succeeded by Air Vice Marshal Jack Plenty
Preceded by Air Vice Marshal Geoff Shepherd	Air Commander Australia; 2005–2007	Succeeded by Air Vice Marshal Mark Binskin
