= Margaret Staib =

Margaret Mary Staib
- Born: 20 December 1962 (age 63); Canberra, Australia
- Military career
- Allegiance: Australia
- Branch: Royal Australian Air Force
- Service years: 1981–2012
- Rank: Air Vice Marshal
- Commands: Joint Logistics Command (2009–12); Australian Defence Force Academy (2009)
- Awards: Member of the Order of Australia; Conspicuous Service Cross; Meritorious Service Medal (United States)
- Other work: CEO, Airservices Australia (2012–15)

Air Vice Marshal Margaret Mary Staib, AM, CSC (born 20 December 1962) is a former chief executive officer of Airservices Australia and a former senior officer in the Royal Australian Air Force (RAAF).

== Early life and education ==
Margaret Staib was born in Canberra, Australian Capital Territory, on 20 December 1962. She was educated at Merici College, joined the RAAF in 1981 as an Officer Cadet and completed a Bachelor of Business at the University of Southern Queensland in 1983.

== Service history ==
Staib was initially posted to RAAF Darwin as the Assistant Facilities Officer. Much of her early RAAF career involved base level logistics, stock control and provisioning with postings to 2 Stores Depot and 486 Squadron.

In the mid-1990s Staib served as the Personal Staff Officer to the Air Officer Commanding Logistics Command and then the newly formed joint service Commander Support Command. During this time she completed a Masters of Business Logistics through the Royal Melbourne Institute of Technology.

Staib was posted to the Pentagon between 1998 and 2000 on exchange with the United States Air Force working on strategic procurement initiatives with industry, supply chain integration and technology. This service was recognised with the United States Meritorious Service Medal.

She was awarded the Conspicuous Service Cross in 2000 for outstanding achievement in the field of Inventory Management in support of military aviation.

Between 2002 and 2005 Staib was the director of planning and logistics – Air Force and in 2005 attended the Australian Defence College gaining a Master of Arts in strategic studies from Deakin University.

Staib was commended for exceptional service as the director of Logistics Support Agency – Air Force and as director general strategic logistics, Joint Logistics Command. In 2009 she spent a year as the commandant of the Australian Defence Force Academy.

In 2009 she was promoted to air vice marshal and appointed commander of Joint Logistics Command.

Staib was appointed a Member of the Order of Australia in 2009 for exceptional service to the Royal Australian Air Force and Australian Defence Force in the field of logistics strategic planning as Director of Logistics Support Agency – Air Force and Director General Strategic Logistics, Joint Logistics Command.

== Airservices Australia ==
On 11 September 2012 Staib was appointed as the chief executive officer of Airservices Australia. On 31 July 2015 Staib would resign as CEO with effect from 10 August. In the media release by Sir Angus Houston, Staib was thanked for her service.

== Honours and awards ==

Member of the Order of Australia (AM)	Awarded 26 January 2009
Conspicuous Service Cross (CSC)	Awarded 12 June 2000
Defence Force Service Medal with 3 clasps	30 years service
Australian Defence Medal	
United States Meritorious Service Medal	

Staib was awarded the 2011 Smart Supply Chain Conference Outstanding Contribution to Supply Chain Management in Australia award.

Military offices
Preceded by Brigadier Wayne Goodman	Commandant of the Australian Defence Force Academy; 2009	Succeeded by Commodore Bruce Kafer
