= Frederick Barnes (RAAF officer) =

- Born: 19 November 1924; Melbourne, Victoria
- Died: 4 August 2018 (aged 93); Dalmeny, New South Wales
- Military career
- Allegiance: Australia
- Branch: Royal Australian Air Force
- Service years: 1943–1981
- Rank: Air Vice Marshal
- Commands: Deputy Chief of the Air Staff (1979–81); RAAF Support Command (1977–79); RAAF Base Williamtown (1976–77); No. 2 Operational Conversion Unit RAAF (1963–65); No. 3 Squadron RAAF (1956–57)
- Conflicts: Second World War; Occupation of Japan; Korean War
- Awards: Officer of the Order of Australia; Distinguished Flying Cross; Air Force Cross; Air Medal (United States)

Air Vice Marshal Frederick William Barnes, AO, DFC, AFC (19 November 1924 – 4 August 2018) was an Australian pilot and senior Royal Australian Air Force (RAAF) officer. Having flown in the Second World War and the Korea War, he rose to become Deputy Chief of the Air Staff (1979–1981).

For his service in Korea, Barnes was awarded the Distinguished Flying Cross (DFC) and the United States Air Medal. In the 1979 Queen's Birthday Honours, he was appointed an Officer of the Order of Australia (AO) "in recognition of service as Air Officer Commanding Support Command".

Military offices
Preceded by Air Vice Marshal Neville McNamara	Deputy Chief of the Air Staff; 1979–1981	Succeeded by Air Vice Marshal Henry Hughes
Preceded by Air Vice Marshal Geoffrey Newstead	Air Officer Commanding Support Command; 1977–1979	Succeeded by Air Vice Marshal Raymond Trebilco
