= Gavin Turnbull =

Australian RAF officer

- Military career
- Allegiance: Australia
- Branch: Royal Australian Air Force
- Service years: 1984–2019
- Rank: Air Vice Marshal
- Commands: Deputy Chief of Air Force (2017–19); Air Command (2014–17); 609th Combined Air Operations Centre (2012); No. 81 Wing RAAF (2007–11); No. 77 Squadron RAAF (2002–04)
- Conflicts: Multinational Force and Observers; War in Afghanistan; Iraq War
- Awards: Member of the Order of Australia; Commendation for Distinguished Service; Bronze Star Medal (United States)

Air Vice Marshal Gavin Alexander Turnbull, AM is a retired senior commander in the Royal Australian Air Force (RAAF). He joined the RAAF in 1984, trained as a helicopter pilot, and transferred to fast jets in 1991. He has commanded No. 77 Squadron RAAF (2002–04), No. 81 Wing RAAF (2007–11) and the 609th Combined Air Operations Centre (2012), and deployed on operations to the Sinai Peninsula, Iraq and Afghanistan. He served as Air Commander Australia from 2014 to 2017, and Deputy Chief of Air Force from May 2017 to July 2019.

== RAAF career ==
Turnbull enlisted in Royal Australian Air Force (RAAF) in 1984, trained as a helicopter pilot, and was commissioned a pilot officer on probation on 21 September. He then joined No. 9 Squadron RAAF at RAAF Base Amberley in Ipswich, Queensland, flying Bell UH-1H Iroquois helicopters. His four-year posting with the squadron included a short deployment with the Multinational Force and Observers on the Sinai Peninsula, for which he received the Australian Service Medal with "Sinai" clasp. Turnbull was granted a permanent commission on 14 August 1986. In 1989, he trained as a flying instructor and was thereafter posted to RAAF Base Pearce at Bullsbrook, Western Australia, serving in an instruction role at No. 2 Flying Training School RAAF.

Turnbull transitioned to fast jets in 1991, training on the Macchi MB-326H and afterwards the McDonnell Douglas F/A-18 Hornet. He was then posted to No. 75 Squadron RAAF, flying F/A-18 Hornets at RAAF Base Tindal in the Northern Territory. After three and a half years with the squadron, he was assigned to a planning role at Headquarters Air Command in 1996, became executive officer of No. 77 Squadron RAAF at RAAF Base Williamtown in 1998, and graduated from the Royal Australian Navy Command and Staff College in 1999. The following year he was appointed to a capability management and development role at Headquarters Tactical Fighter Group, before assuming command of No. 77 Squadron from January 2002 to December 2004. In 2005, he became Director Airworthiness Coordination and Policy Agency at Australian Defence Force Headquarters.

In March 2007, Turnbull deployed to Baghdad for a six-month tour as chief of staff at the Australian National Headquarters. His role served to support Australian operations in Iraq and Afghanistan as part of Operation Catalyst and Operation Slipper, respectively. Turnbull was awarded a Commendation for Distinguished Service for his "distinguished performance of duties" as chief of staff and, following his return to Australia, he was appointed to command No. 81 Wing RAAF at RAAF Base Williamtown on 1 November 2007. He was next posted to Canberra as Director Military Strategic Commitments in January 2011. Turnbull redeployed to the Middle East twelve months later, where he was appointed to command the 609th Combined Air Operations Centre in the United States Central Command. He was awarded the United States Bronze Star Medal for his services in the role.

Turnbull returned to Australia in May 2012, and was simultaneously appointed Director General Air Command Operations at Headquarters Air Command and Director General Air at Headquarters Joint Operations Command in Bungendore. He was promoted air vice marshal and succeeded Air Vice Marshal Mel Hupfeld as Air Commander Australia, responsible for the operational capability of the RAAF, on 12 September 2014. Turnbull was appointed a Member of the Order of Australia in the 2016 Australia Day Honours. The citation for the award praised Turnbull's "extraordinary airmanship and exceptional managerial skill", and was made in recognition of his "exceptional service to the Australian Defence Force in air combat capability development and support to military operations". He relinquished Air Command to Air Vice Marshal Steve Roberton, and was made Deputy Chief of Air Force (DCAF) on 1 May 2017. After two years in the role, Turnbull was succeeded as DCAF by Air Vice Marshal Stephen Meredith in July 2019 and retired from full-time RAAF service.

== Personal life ==
Turnbull is married to Jackie and has five children; four sons and one daughter. He has logged over 3,600 hours flying rotary wing and jet aircraft.

Military offices
Preceded by Air Vice Marshal Warren McDonald	Deputy Chief of Air Force; 2017–2019	Succeeded by Air Vice Marshal Stephen Meredith
Preceded by Air Vice Marshal Mel Hupfeld	Air Commander Australia; 2014–2017	Succeeded by Air Vice Marshal Steve Roberton
