= Deputy Chief of Air Force (Australia) =

- Incumbent; Steve Pesce since January 2026
- Style: Air Vice Marshal
- Member of: Australian Defence Force
- Reports to: Chief of Air Force
- Inaugural holder: Air Commodore; William Bostock
- Formation: 1939

Deputy Chief of Air Force (DCAF) is the second most senior appointment in the Royal Australian Air Force, responsible to the Chief of Air Force (CAF). Before 1997 the position was entitled Deputy Chief of the Air Staff (DCAS). The rank associated with the position is air vice marshal (two-star). DCAF acts as the manager of the Air Force Headquarters (AFHQ), which provides oversight of activities in the raising, training and sustaining of assigned RAAF capabilities. The position provides strategic leadership to the RAAF as a whole, as well as policy guidance in regard to Air Force activities to the rest of the Defence organisation and Government. The current Deputy Chief of Air Force is Air Vice Marshal Steve Pesce.

== Appointees ==
The following list chronologically records those who have held the post of Deputy Chief of Air Force or its preceding position of Deputy Chief of the Air Staff. The rank and honours are as at the completion of the commander's term.

Rank	Name	Post- Nominals	Term began	Term ended
Deputy Chief of the Air Staff
Air Commodore	William Bostock	OBE	1939	1941
Air Commodore	John McCauley	CBE	1942	1944
Air Commodore	Frank Bladin	CBE	1944	1946
Air Commodore	John McCauley	CBE	1946	1947
Air Commodore	Frederick Scherger	CBE, DSO, AFC	1947	1951
Air Vice Marshal	Valston Hancock	OBE, DFC	1951	1952
Air Vice Marshal	William Hely	CBE, AFC	1953	1955
Air Vice Marshal	Douglas Candy	CBE	1956	1958
Air Vice Marshal	Alister Murdoch	CBE	1958	1959
Air Vice Marshal	Ian McLachlan	CBE, DFC	1959	1961
Air Vice Marshal	Colin Hannah	CB, CBE	1961	1965
Air Vice Marshal	Frank Headlam	CB, CBE	1965	1966
Air Vice Marshal	Brian Eaton	CBE, DSO & Bar, DFC	1966	1967
Air Vice Marshal	William Townsend	CBE	1967	1969
Air Vice Marshal	Charles Read	CBE, DFC, AFC	1970	1972
Air Vice Marshal	Geoffrey Newstead	CBE	1972	1973
Air Vice Marshal	Frederick Robey	CBE	1973	1974
Air Vice Marshal	Douglas Hurditch	CBE	1974	1975
Air Vice Marshal	Neville McNamara	AO, CBE, AFC	1975	1979
Air Vice Marshal	Frederick Barnes	AO, DFC, AFC	1979	1981
Air Vice Marshal	Henry Hughes	AO, DFC	1981	1983
Air Vice Marshal	John Newham	AO	1983	1985
Air Vice Marshal	Billie Collings	AO, AFC	1985	1987
Air Vice Marshal	Richard Bradford	AO	1987	1990
Air Vice Marshal	Edward Radford	AO	1990	1990
Air Vice Marshal	Thomas O'Brien	AO, AFC	1990	1993
Air Vice Marshal	Les Fisher	AO	1993	1994
Air Vice Marshal	David Rogers	AM	1994	1997
Deputy Chief of Air Force
Air Vice Marshal	Robert Richardson	AO, AFC	1997	1997
Air Vice Marshal	Errol McCormack	AM	1997	1998
Air Vice Marshal	Brent Espeland	AM	1998	1999
Air Vice Marshal	Alan Titheridge	AO	1999	2001
Air Vice Marshal	Christopher Spence	AO	2001	2004
Air Vice Marshal	Roxley McLennan	AM	2004	2005
Air Vice Marshal	John Blackburn	AO	2005	2008
Air Vice Marshal	Geoff Brown	AM	2008	2011
Air Vice Marshal	Neil Hart	AM	2011	2012
Air Vice Marshal	Leo Davies	AO, CSC	2012	2015
Air Vice Marshal	Warren McDonald	AM, CSC	2015	2017
Air Vice Marshal	Gavin Turnbull	AM	2017	2019
Air Vice Marshal	Stephen Meredith	AM, DSM	2019	2023
Air Vice Marshal	Glen Braz	AM, CSC, DSM	2023	2023
Air Vice Marshal	Harvey Reynolds	AM	2023	2026
Air Vice Marshal	Steve Pesce	AM	2026	Incumbent
