= Robert Richardson (RAAF officer) =

Royal Australian Air Force commander

- Born: 14 May 1941 (age 85); Melbourne, Victoria
- Military career
- Allegiance: Australia
- Branch: Royal Australian Air Force
- Service years: 1961–97
- Rank: Air Vice Marshal
- Nickname: Pin
- Commands: Deputy Chief of Air Force (1997); Training Command (1992–93); Aircraft Research and Development Unit (1986–87)
- Conflicts: Indonesia–Malaysia confrontation
- Awards: Officer of the Order of Australia; Air Force Cross

Air Vice Marshal Robert Victor Richardson, AO, AFC (born 13 May 1941) is a retired senior commander of the Royal Australian Air Force (RAAF). He was the Air Officer Commanding Training Command 1992 to 1993, and Deputy Chief of Air Force in 1997.

== Early life and career ==
Richardson was born in Melbourne, Victoria, on 13 May 1941, and joined the RAAF in 1961. He completed pilots course and was posted to No. 77 Squadron to fly the Avon Sabre in Malaysia, Singapore and North Borneo. He was posted to Thailand and flew the Avon Sabre at No. 79 Squadron. After instructor training, Richardson was posted to Basic Flying Training School and instructed from 1966 to 1967.

Following his tour as an Instructor, Richardson undertook the Empire Test Pilots' School Fixed Wing course in 1968 where he won the Hawker Hunter trophy with B.P.L. Stokes for the best Preview Handling report on the course. At the completion of the course he was posted to the Aircraft Research and Development Unit, RAAF Base Laverton. He was actively involved in the operational development of the RAAF's Mirages, F/A-18 Hornets and F111Cs, flying 5500 hours in over 40 types from sailplanes to the F-16 and F/A-18. In 1986 to 1987 Richardson commanded the Aircraft Research and Development Unit, by then at RAAF Base Edinburgh.

In his later career he specialised in strategic Defence planning (he was co-author of the 1994 Government White Paper on Defence) and in RAAF personnel management, finally spending several years as an air vice-marshal looking after RAAF personnel and budgetary resources and later Deputy Chief of Air Force. After part-time Reserve duty conducting a major review of the Defence Cadets organisation, Richardson retired from the RAAF in 2003.

== Personal life ==
Richardson is an Alpaca and Merino woolgrower at Bowning, New South Wales.

Military offices
Preceded by Air Vice Marshal David Rogers	Deputy Chief of Air Force; 1997	Succeeded by Air Vice Marshal Errol McCormack
