= Steve Roberton =

Australian air force officer

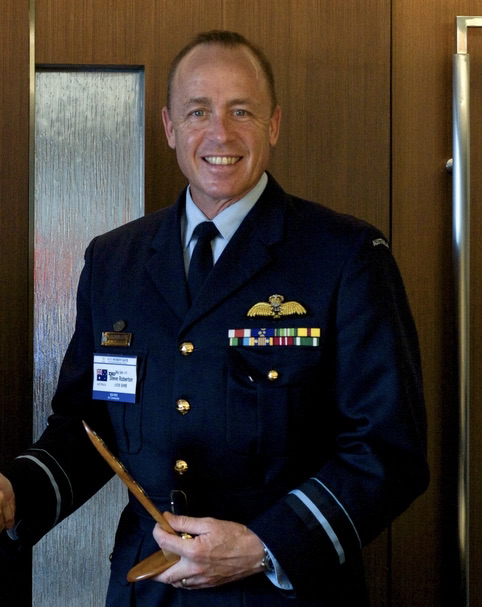
- Roberton in 2017
- Born: 1967 or 1968 (age 57–58)
- Military career
- Allegiance: Australia
- Branch: Royal Australian Air Force
- Service years: 1989–2022
- Rank: Air Vice Marshal
- Nickname: Zed
- Commands: Head Force Design (2019–22); Air Command (2017–19); Air Combat Group RAAF (2015–17); Air Task Group 630 (2014–15); No. 82 Wing RAAF (2010–11); No. 75 Squadron RAAF (2003–06)
- Conflicts: War in Afghanistan; Iraq War; Operation Okra
- Awards: Distinguished Service Cross; Member of the Order of Australia; Navy and Marine Corps Commendation Medal (United States)

Air Vice Marshal Steven Peter "Zed" Roberton, DSC, AM (born c. 1968) is a retired senior commander of the Royal Australian Air Force (RAAF). He joined the RAAF in 1989 and trained as a fighter pilot. He has deployed to Iraq, commanded No. 75 Squadron RAAF (2003–06) and No. 82 Wing RAAF (2010–11), and led Air Task Group 630 on operations against the Islamic State of Iraq and the Levant (2014–15). He served as commander Air Combat Group RAAF from 2015 to 2017, Air Commander Australia from 2017 to 2019, and Head Force Design within the Vice Chief of Defence Force Group from June 2019 to February 2022.

== Early life ==
Roberton grew up on the Sunshine Coast of Queensland, where he was an active surfer. He studied a Bachelor of Science in Chemistry and Mathematics at the University of Queensland, graduating in 1988. He had originally intended to pursue graduate studies in medicine, but after joining the university glider club he gained a passion for flying and decided to embark on a career in aviation.

== RAAF career ==
Roberton was accepted into the Royal Australian Air Force (RAAF) as a direct entry pilot trainee in 1989. He completed initial officer and flight training at RAAF Point Cook and RAAF Base Pearce, graduating from No. 153 Pilots Course in 1990. He specialised as a fighter pilot, training on the Macchi MB-326, before converting to the McDonnell Douglas F/A-18 Hornet in 1993. A three-year fighter tour with No. 3 Squadron RAAF followed at RAAF Base Williamtown, before he was posted on exchange with the United States Marine Corps at Marine Corps Air Station Beaufort in South Carolina from 1996. He returned to No. 3 Squadron, as commander of A Flight, in 1998.

Roberton was posted to the Fighter Requirements division of the Capability Development Group for eighteen months from July 2000. He was then selected to attend the Australian Command and Staff College, where he graduated with a Master of Management in Defence Studies from the affiliated University of Canberra in 2002. Following the course, he was appointed Deputy Director Aircraft Survivability within the Capability Development Group and deployed in support of Operations Slipper and Falconer, Australia's contribution to the wars in Afghanistan and Iraq. Roberton received a Chief of Air Force Commendation for his performance in the Middle East and, following his return to Australia, assumed command of No. 75 Squadron RAAF at RAAF Base Tindal from November 2003.

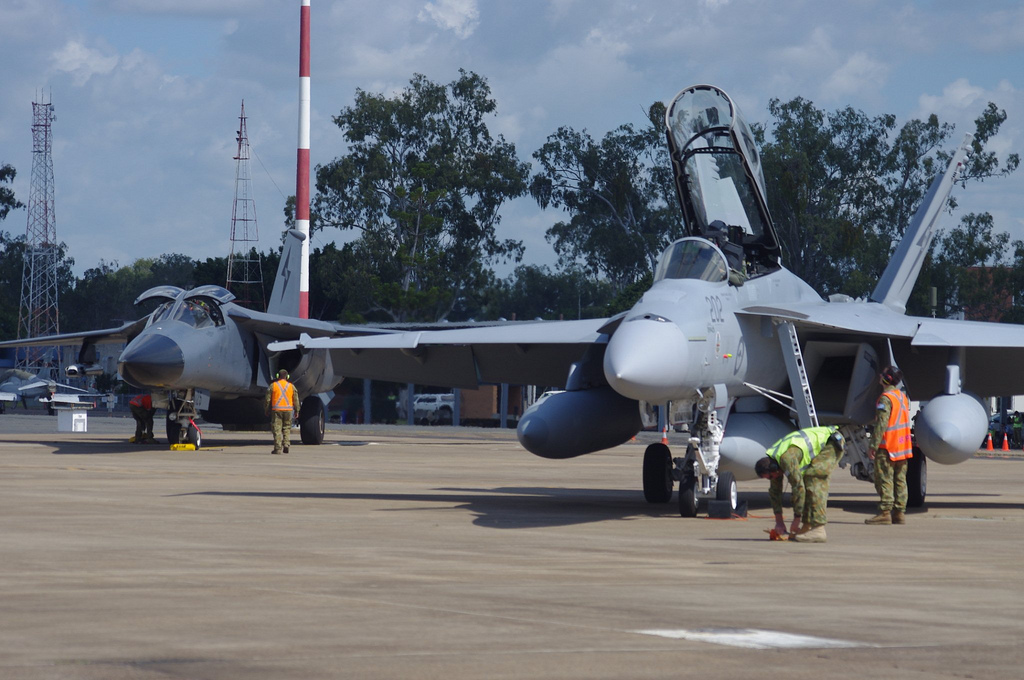
Roberton led the RAAF's transition from the F-111C (left) to the F/A-18F (right) from 2006 to 2010.

Towards the end of his three years of squadron command, Roberton thought he may have reached his ceiling in the RAAF and was again contemplating studies in medicine at the University of Queensland. He was instead head-hunted to lead the RAAF's A$6.5 billion transition from the General Dynamics F-111C to the Boeing F/A-18F Super Hornet, serving as Head Air Combat Transition Office from November 2006. Roberton was posted to RAAF Base Amberley in command of No. 82 Wing RAAF in April 2010, having overseen the introduction of the Super Hornet into Australian service ahead of schedule and below budget. He was appointed a Member of the Order of Australia in the 2012 Australia Day Honours, the award recognising his "exceptional capability, capacity and devotion" to "effective Air Combat Group capability" in both his command appointments and during the introduction of the Super Hornet. Roberton next completed the Higher Command and Staff Course in the United Kingdom in early 2012, before returning to Australia in April as Director General Aerospace Development in the Capability Development Group.

In September 2014, Roberton was selected as the inaugural commander of Air Task Group 630 on Operation Okra. The air task group deployed to Al Minhad Air Base in the United Arab Emirates as part of the coalition to combat Islamic State forces in Iraq. Consisting of 400 RAAF personnel and eight aircraft, it was the largest air task group to deploy from Australia since the Vietnam War. Under Roberton's command, Air Task Group 630 conducted airstrikes, flew in support of Iraqi and Kurdish ground forces, and assisted in freeing Yezidi people trapped in the Sinjar Mountains. Roberton handed over command of the air task group to Air Commodore Glen Braz on 5 January 2015, by which time the Australian aircraft were flying approximately 13 percent of coalition airstrikes in Iraq. In recognition of his "tireless devotion and exceptional personal skills" in the establishment, deployment and initial operations of Air Task Group 630, Roberton was awarded the Distinguished Service Cross in the 2016 Australia Day Honours.

Roberton was appointed commander Air Combat Group at RAAF Base Williamtown in January 2015, with responsibility for the administration of the RAAF's fast-jet combat aircraft and command of Australia's air combat operations. Following promotion to air vice marshal, he succeeded Air Vice Marshal Gavin Turnbull as Air Commander Australia—responsible for the operational capability of the RAAF—on 1 May 2017. Roberton became Head Force Design within the Vice Chief of Defence Force Group in June 2019.

== Personal life ==
Roberton is married to Libby, with whom he has three children. He has logged more than 3,500 hours flying fighter aircraft, mostly in the F/A-18.

Military offices
Preceded by Rear Admiral Stuart Mayer	Head Force Design; 2019–2022	Succeeded by Major General Anthony Rawlins
Preceded by Air Vice Marshal Gavin Turnbull	Air Commander Australia; 2017–2019	Succeeded by Air Vice Marshal Joe Iervasi
