= Bruce Kafer =

- Born: 1959 (age 66–67); Newcastle, New South Wales
- Military career
- Allegiance: Australia
- Branch: Royal Australian Naval Reserve
- Service years: 1977–present
- Rank: Rear Admiral
- Commands: Head Cadet, Reserve & Employer Support Division; Director-General of the Australian Navy Cadets & Reserves; Australian Defence Force Academy; Combined Task Force 152/158; Hydrographic Service; HMAS Leeuwin; HMAS Flinders
- Conflicts: Iran–Iraq War; Iraq War
- Awards: Member of the Order of Australia; Conspicuous Service Cross

Rear Admiral Bruce Kafer, AM, CSC (born 1959) is a senior Royal Australian Navy officer and former Commandant of the Australian Defence Force Academy, a position he held from December 2009 until December 2013. Kafer served as the Director-General of the Australian Navy Cadets and Reserves from December 2014 to December 2016, when he was appointed Head of the Cadet, Reserve and Employer Support Division.

== Naval career ==
Born in Newcastle, New South Wales, Kafer was admitted to the Royal Australian Naval College, Jervis Bay as a cadet midshipman in 1977. He subsequently trained on USS Chicago, HMAS Supply, HMAS Moresby and HMAS Swan before specialising as a Hydrographic Surveyor in 1982. As such, he served primarily aboard the survey ships Flinders and Moresby.

In 1986, he began an exchange with the Royal Navy, including senior Hydrographic Officer posts aboard HMS Fawn and HMS Herald, which included time spent in the Persian Gulf as part as British anti-mine efforts in the Iran–Iraq War.

Returning to Australia in 1992, he took up command of HMAS Flinders, and in 1994 was appointed as a Director of the RAN Staff College. After another period as a Hydrographic Officer, in 1997 he took command of HMAS Leeuwin upon its commission into the RAN. Late in 2000, he returned to the Australian Hydrographic Office to begin a four-year appointment as Commander of the RAN Hydrographic, Meteorological and Oceanographic Force Element Group.

He later served as Chief of the Combat Support Group at RAN Headquarters and then returned to Iraq to begin an appointment as Commander Task Forces 152 and 158, coalition maritime task forces which were responsible for security and interception operations in the Gulf.

In December 2009 Kafer assumed duties as Commandant of the Australian Defence Force Academy. In 2011 the ADFA Skype sex-scandal occurred at ADFA, where Officer Cadets Daniel McDonald and secretly recorded video of McDonald having sex with a female cadet in the same cohort, and streamed via skype to five other cadets including Dylan Deblaquiere in another room. Following this, Commodore Kafer was stood down as Commandant, publicly criticised for his handling of the incident by the then Minister for Defence Stephen Smith (Australian politician). Rear admiral James Goldrick became acting Commandant. On 28 August 2013 McDonald and Deblaquiere were found guilty of "using a carriage service in an offensive manner", and McDonald was further found guilty of "committing an act of indecency". A review into the incident and the actions of Kafer was ordered, which cleared him of any wrongdoing; and despite reinstating him in March 2012, Smith continued to criticise Kafer's handling of the incident. Kafer stayed on as Commandant until December 2013, when he was replaced by Air Commodore Alan Clements.

He has since served as Director-General of the Australian Navy Cadets & Reserves.

Kafer was promoted to rear admiral in December 2016 and appointed as Head of the Cadet, Reserve and Employer Support Division.

== Personal life ==
Kafer and his wife, Geraldine, have two adult sons.

Military offices
Preceded by Air Commodore Margaret Staib	Commandant of the Australian Defence Force Academy; 2009–2013	Succeeded by Air Commodore Alan Clements
Preceded by Commodore Geoff Geraghty	Director-General of the Australian Navy Cadets and Reserves; 2014–2016	Succeeded by TBA
Preceded by Major General Iain Spence	Head Cadet, Reserve and Employer Support Division; 2016 – present	Incumbent
