= William Bostock =

Royal Australian Air Force senior commander

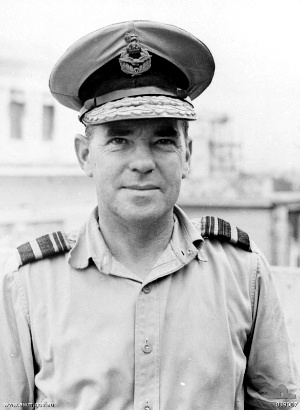
- Air Vice Marshal Bill Bostock, 1945
- Born: 5 February 1892; Sydney, New South Wales
- Died: 28 April 1968 (aged 76); Benalla, Victoria
- Military career
- Allegiance: Australia
- Branch: Royal Australian Air Force
- Service years: 1914–1946
- Rank: Air Vice Marshal
- Unit: No. 48 Squadron RFC (1917–1918)
- Commands: No. 3 Squadron (1931–1936); RAAF Command (1942–1945)
- Conflicts: World War I; Gallipoli Campaign; Western Front; World War II; Pacific War; South West Pacific theatre
- Awards: Companion of the Order of the Bath; Distinguished Service Order; Officer of the Order of the British Empire; Croix de guerre (Belgium); Medal of Freedom with Silver Palm (US)
- Other work: Member for Indi (1949–1958)

Air Vice Marshal William Dowling Bostock, CB, DSO, OBE (5 February 1892 – 28 April 1968) was a senior commander in the Royal Australian Air Force (RAAF). During World War II he led RAAF Command, the Air Force's main operational formation, with responsibility for the defence of Australia and air offensives against Japanese targets in the South West Pacific Area. His achievements in the role earned him the Distinguished Service Order and the American Medal of Freedom. General Douglas MacArthur described him as "one of the world's most successful airmen".

A veteran of World War I, Bostock first saw combat as a soldier in the Australian Imperial Force at Gallipoli, then as a pilot in the Royal Flying Corps on the Western Front, where he earned the Belgian Croix de guerre. He joined the newly formed RAAF in 1921 and by 1941 had risen to become its third most senior officer, serving as Director of Training from 1930 to 1931, commanding officer of No. 3 Squadron from 1931 to 1936, and Director of Operations and Intelligence from 1938 to 1939.

The Deputy Chief of the Air Staff at the outbreak of World War II, Bostock was considered a leading candidate for the position of Chief of the Air Staff in 1942 but was passed over in favour of Air Commodore George Jones, a friend of twenty years. Appointed Air Officer Commanding RAAF Command soon after, Bostock became involved in a bitter and long-running dispute with Jones over control of the Air Force in the South West Pacific. Following his retirement from the RAAF in 1946, he became a journalist and later a Federal Member of Parliament.

== Early life and World War I ==
Bostock was born in Surry Hills, an inner-city suburb of Sydney, to an English father, also named William, and a Spanish mother, Mary. He was educated at The School, Mount Victoria, in the Blue Mountains region of New South Wales, where he completed his junior certificate. The family later moved to Burwood, in Sydney's Inner West. After leaving school Bostock was employed as an apprentice with the Marconi Company for two-and-a-half years, and spent time at sea as a wireless operator.

In November 1914, Bostock joined the 2nd Signal Troop of the Australian Imperial Force (AIF) as a sapper. He landed at Gallipoli on 25 April 1915, serving there until August, when he was evacuated suffering from dysentery. He returned to active duty in January 1916, and was promoted to lance corporal the following month. Raised to sergeant, Bostock was posted to Egypt with the ANZAC Mounted Division in April 1916, and saw action against Turkish forces in the Sinai Peninsula.

Bostock transferred from the AIF to the Royal Flying Corps Special Reserve on 18 February 1917, and was commissioned as a probationary second lieutenant. He was posted to No. 48 Squadron in August, following pilot training in Egypt and England. Bostock fought on the Western Front and was awarded the Belgian Croix de guerre. He was invalided back to Britain in March 1918, after which he transferred to the newly created Royal Air Force (RAF).

== Inter-war years ==
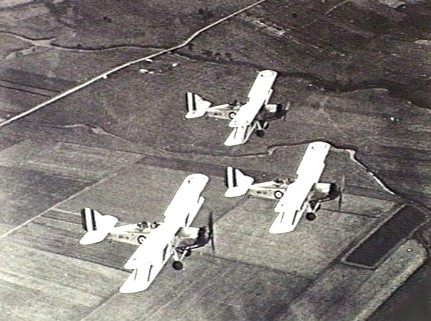
Wapitis of No. 3 Squadron, commanded by Bostock, in the Richmond area, October 1932

Bostock married his Australian fiancée, Gwendolen Norton, in Southampton on 6 March 1919. The couple had two daughters, one of whom, Gwendolen Joan, would serve as a cipher officer in the Women's Auxiliary Australian Air Force (WAAAF) during World War II. Bostock retired from the RAF and returned to civilian life in Australia that October. In September 1921, he joined the recently formed Royal Australian Air Force (RAAF) and was commissioned a flying officer. He became a friend and mentor to Flying Officer (later Air Marshal Sir) George Jones, another World War I veteran, who had flown with the Australian Flying Corps and had joined the Air Force in March. By mid-1922 Bostock had been promoted to flight lieutenant.

Having served at No. 1 Flying Training School (No. 1 FTS), Point Cook, since entering the RAAF, Bostock was posted to Britain in 1926 to attend RAF Staff College, Andover. While there he was admonished by the college's commandant, via letter, due to the particular school he had chosen for his daughter and because he did his own gardening; Bostock was said to have returned the letter marked "noted and ignored". On his return to Australia as a squadron leader in 1928, he took charge of No. 1 FTS, and became Director of Training at RAAF Headquarters, Melbourne, in December 1929. From 1931 to 1936 Bostock was commanding officer (CO) of No. 3 Squadron, flying Westland Wapitis and, later, Hawker Demons. At the time, his position as No. 3 Squadron commander doubled as CO of the unit's base, RAAF Station Richmond, New South Wales. A wing commander from 1934, he was appointed an Officer of the Order of the British Empire in the King's Birthday Honours on 31 May 1935. Following a two-year posting in Britain on the staff of No. 1 Bomber Group, Bostock was promoted to group captain on 1 September 1938 and made Director of Operations and Intelligence. Within a year he had become Deputy Chief of the Air Staff.

== World War II ==
=== Deputy Chief of the Air Staff ===
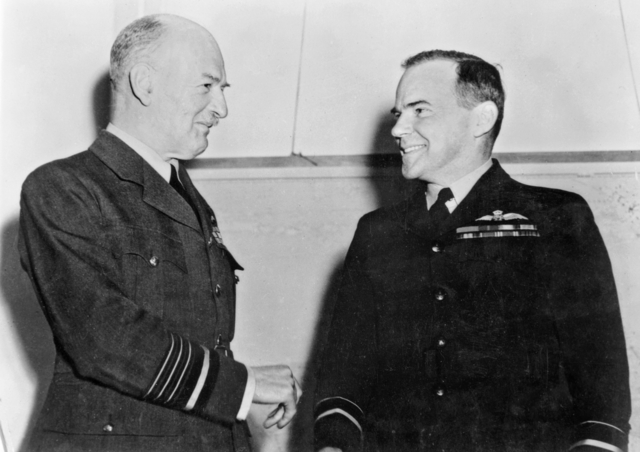
Air Vice Marshal Bostock (right) as Deputy Chief of the Air Staff with the Chief of the Air Staff, Air Chief Marshal Sir Charles Burnett, in May 1942

The Deputy Chief of the Air Staff position that Bostock occupied at the outbreak of World War II was a new one that initially augmented, and later supplanted, an existing Assistant Chief of the Air Staff role. Unlike the Assistant Chief, the Deputy had the authority to act in place of the Chief of the Air Staff (CAS) if required. This increased status saw Bostock given a place on Australia's Joint Planning Committee. He was the RAAF's delegate to a defence conference in Singapore in October 1940; the Australian contingent found the local forces ill-prepared for an attack by the Japanese and recommended significant increases in air capability, both in Australia and the Pacific Islands, to meet the threat. Bostock rose rapidly in rank during this period, becoming acting air commodore on 1 June 1940 and substantive air vice marshal on 1 October 1941. He was appointed a Companion of the Order of the Bath in the 1942 New Year Honours.

Third in seniority in the RAAF after Air Marshal Richard Williams and Air Vice Marshal Stanley Goble, and considered, in the words of historian Chris Coulthard-Clark, to be "among the Air Force's best brains" at the time, Bostock was a prime candidate for the position of CAS in May 1942. He was also first choice of the incumbent CAS, Air Chief Marshal Sir Charles Burnett, whose two-year term was coming to an end. Bostock's closeness to Burnett, who had made no secret of his contempt for John Curtin's Federal Labor government, damaged his chances for selection and his friend, George Jones, then only a substantive wing commander and acting air commodore, took the position. Although he had expected to be made CAS, Bostock warmly congratulated Jones, possibly expecting that his (Bostock's) new role as chief of staff to the Commander of Allied Air Forces, Lieutenant General George Brett, with responsibility for air operations in the South West Pacific Area (SWPA), would prove the more important appointment in a time of war.

=== Air Officer Commanding RAAF Command ===
In August 1942, General Douglas MacArthur, Supreme Commander SWPA, replaced Lieutenant General Brett with Major General (later General) George Kenney. Kenney created two new formations subordinate to Allied Air Forces Headquarters: the US Fifth Air Force and RAAF Command. Bostock was chosen to be Air Officer Commanding RAAF Command, with twenty-four Australian squadrons at his disposal plus one each from the Netherlands, the United Kingdom and the United States. The only Australian air combat units in the SWPA not under Bostock's command were those based in New Guinea as No. 9 Operational Group RAAF (No. 9 OG), controlled by Fifth Air Force. RAAF Command was charged with defending Australia, except in the north-east, protecting the sea lanes to New Guinea, and conducting operations against Japanese shipping, airfields and other installations in the Dutch East Indies.

He looked gruff and tough ... but he impressed me as being honest and I believed that, if he would work with me at all, he would be loyal to me.

— George Kenney on Bill Bostock, 1942

By the end of 1943, No. 9 OG, originally the RAAF's mobile strike formation, had effectively become a static garrison force in New Guinea. Bostock proposed that it be renamed Northern Area Command to better reflect its current function. Kenney asked Bostock to raise a new RAAF mobile formation, which led to the establishment of No. 10 Operational Group (No. 10 OG) on 13 November 1943 at Nadzab, under the command of Group Captain Frederick Scherger. In February 1944, RAAF Command took over many of the units of No. 9 OG, as well as responsibility for the Port Moresby and Milne Bay sectors. Bostock again recommended changing No. 9 OG's name to Northern Area, and also proposed changing No. 10 OG's name to Tactical Air Force, RAAF, in view of its increased strength from the infusion of new squadrons. No. 9 OG became Northern Command on 11 April. On 14 September, Bostock had an audience with Prime Minister Curtin, wherein the latter outlined his preferences for the deployment of RAAF Command, particularly that it should be represented in forward Allied operations, and employed primarily in the support of Australian ground forces. Bostock concurred; Curtin meanwhile authorised changing No. 10 OG's name to First Tactical Air Force (No. 1 TAF), with effect from 25 October. RAAF Command's complement had now swelled to forty-one Australian squadrons.

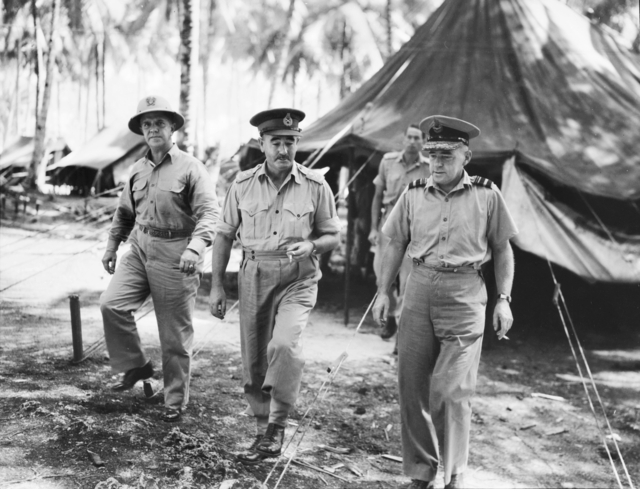
Bostock (right) with Australian I Corps commander Lieutenant General Sir Leslie Morshead (centre) and Rear Admiral Forrest B. Royal of the US Navy (left), following a meeting at Morotai in April 1945

On 15 March 1945, Bostock established a forward headquarters on Morotai Island to directly control No. 1 TAF for the upcoming Oboe operations, the reoccupation of Borneo. Kenney gave him responsibility for all Allied air operations south of the Philippines, and the Royal New Zealand Air Force (RNZAF) units which were based in the Solomon Islands to support the Bougainville Campaign were assigned to RAAF Command. Bostock wrote to Kenney, "I am particularly anxious that the 1st Tactical Air Force should continue to be employed as a forward offensive formation rather than in a garrison role." In April, Kenney's Allied Air Headquarters issued an order that Bostock would be named Air Officer Commanding-in-Chief RAAF Command, because he had several Air Officers Commanding (AOCs) reporting to him. Bostock duly passed on this change of nomenclature to his subordinate units but Air Force Headquarters in Melbourne vetoed the change in June.

Bostock had control of the USAAF Fifth and Thirteenth Air Forces, as well as No. 1 TAF, during Operation Oboe One, the invasion of Tarakan, commencing 1 May 1945. By this time RAAF Command comprised some 17,000 personnel. On Operation Oboe Six, the invasion of Labuan–Brunei in June, Bostock also had at his disposal aircraft based in Australia under Western and North-Western Area Commands. For Operation Oboe Two, the invasion of Balikpapan in July, Bostock marshalled forty Allied squadrons. His aim, in concert with that of Kenney and I Corps commander Lieutenant General Leslie Morshead, was to deliver the heaviest aerial bombardment possible against enemy targets, to enable Australian assault forces to land with minimal casualties. Together with a naval barrage, this resulted in what the official history of the RAAF in World War II described as a "scene of indescribable ruin" on the battlefield, and allowed seventeen waves of troops to disembark their landing craft without loss. MacArthur called the Labuan air offensive "flawless", and General Sir Thomas Blamey, Commander-in-Chief of the Australian Military Forces, congratulated Bostock on his "high order of control" and "ready and full cooperation" throughout the Borneo campaign.

=== Rivalry with George Jones ===
From 1942, the structure of the RAAF was divided such that Bostock was in operational charge of the Air Force in the South West Pacific but relied on Air Vice Marshal Jones as CAS for supplies of manpower and equipment, while Jones was nominally in command of the entire RAAF but played no part in directing its major air operations against Japan. The situation was, according to George Odgers, a source of "acute personal tension" between the two senior officers for the remainder of the war. It was exacerbated by the fact that although the CAS was de jure head of the RAAF, Jones' rank of air vice marshal was no higher than Bostock's. Air Force historian Alan Stephens later commented: "The system of divided command... was not an ideal arrangement, but with men of goodwill it could have worked. Regrettably Bostock and Jones were not of that mind..."

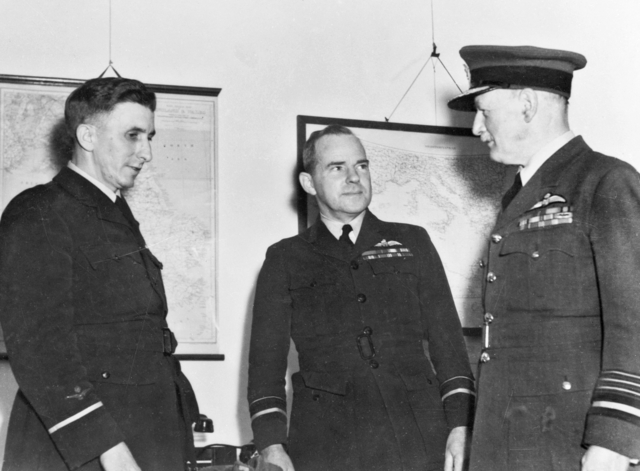
Bostock (centre) with newly appointed Chief of the Air Staff, Air Vice Marshal George Jones (left), and former CAS, Air Chief Marshal Burnett, in 1942

Bostock's relationship to Kenney permitted him to ignore operational requests from Jones, while Jones continued to assert administrative control over Bostock's command. When Jones tried to remove Bostock from RAAF Command in April 1943 and replace him with Air Commodore Joe Hewitt, AOC of No. 9 Operational Group, Bostock appealed to Kenney, who advised Jones that he was opposed to any such change of command. Kenney threatened to escalate the matter to the Australian government, and some time later MacArthur told Curtin that Hewitt "was not an adequate replacement" for Bostock. The matter was allowed to drop, but the rivalry continued. In January 1945, an acrimonious series of cables was exchanged between the two air vice marshals. Jones complained to Bostock of the latter's "insubordinate tone" and "repeated attempts to usurp authority of this Headquarters". Bostock replied that as AOC RAAF Command he was "responsible to Commander, Allied Air Forces, and not, repeat not, subordinate to you", and that he would "continue to take the strongest exception to your unwarranted and uninformed interference".

Their feud was blamed for contributing to the low morale that precipitated the so-called "Morotai Mutiny" of April 1945, when a group of senior pilots in the First Tactical Air Force submitted their resignations rather than continue to attack what they believed to be worthless targets. Alerted to the issue by No. 1 TAF's commander, Air Commodore Harry Cobby, Bostock appealed to the pilots to withdraw their resignations. According to historian Kristen Alexander, his methods were construed as an attempt to "make the situation go away or to at least cover it up"; one of the "mutineers", Squadron Leader John Waddy, quoted Bostock as saying, "I will leave these applications on the table and if you pick them up, all records and all notes of any of this affair will be expunged from Air Force records and files and nothing will be heard about it". When the pilots refused to drop the matter, Bostock signalled Jones, advising that he found morale on the island to be at a "dangerously low level" and recommending the CAS replace Cobby with Air Commodore Scherger. Kenney concurred with Bostock, and Jones sacked Cobby. A subsequent investigation vindicated the stand taken by the pilots; one of them, Wing Commander Kenneth Ranger, told the inquiry of Jones and Bostock: "I deplore the fighting and wrangling between them which is common knowledge throughout the Air Force. Every week there are instances of it."

The Chief of the Air Staff ... who has no authority or responsibility for the conduct of operations, has no right – particularly no moral right – to dispute, on operational or tactical grounds, operational requirements demanded by the Air Office Commanding R.A.A.F. Command ...

— Bill Bostock, 1944

The conflict between the commanders reached its nadir during the invasion of Tarakan in May 1945, when Jones grounded RAAF bomber squadrons scheduled to take part in the attack due to their crews having exceeded their monthly quota of flying hours. Bostock was not consulted about the decision and fully expected to see Australian aircraft as he watched for the Allied formations from a US warship during the battle. He later said that he would have thankfully "fallen through a crack in the boards on the deck" when he saw only American aircraft flying overhead, and had to apologise to Kenney for the RAAF's absence. Over all, the dual system of control and the tension between its two senior officers confused the RAAF's efforts in the field and reduced its influence on Allied strategy in the Pacific.

== Later life ==
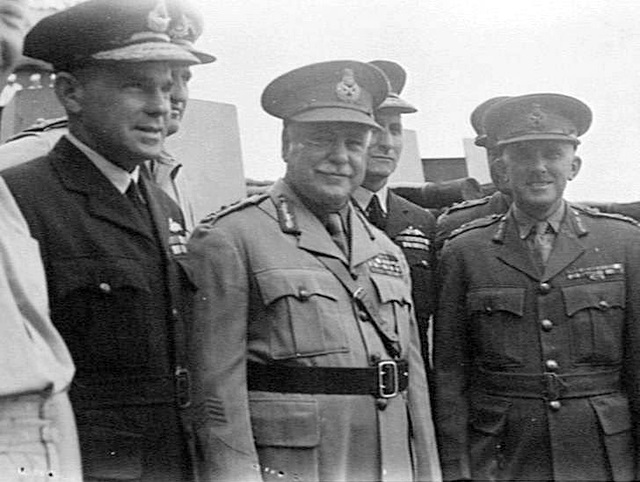
Bostock (front row, left), General Sir Thomas Blamey (front row, centre) and Air Vice Marshal Jones (behind Blamey) with other Australian delegates to the Japanese surrender aboard USS Missouri, September 1945

Bostock and Jones represented the RAAF at the Japanese surrender aboard USS Missouri on 2 September 1945. RAAF Command was disbanded the same day. Bostock was one of several senior Air Force commanders summarily retired early in 1946, in his case six years before the compulsory retirement age of 60. Among the reasons for Bostock's dismissal were, according to private government papers, an "inability to work in harmony with certain other high ranking RAAF officers", and "lack of balance and appreciation of responsibility". He appealed the decision, citing a letter from MacArthur that described him as "one of the world's most successful airmen ... superior in every respect", but was unsuccessful. Newspapers raised questions about Bostock's departure, The Herald in Melbourne speculating on the part played by rivalries within the service.

After his retirement from the military, Bostock went into journalism and became an aviation correspondent for The Herald. He wrote a series of articles criticising the Air Force's organisation and presenting his side of the story of RAAF Command, motivated partly by his belief that the official history of Australia in World War II would fail to adequately cover it. The articles caused considerable controversy and prompted the Minister for Air, Arthur Drakeford, to make a formal response in Federal Parliament, labelling Bostock's allegations "malicious and unjustified".

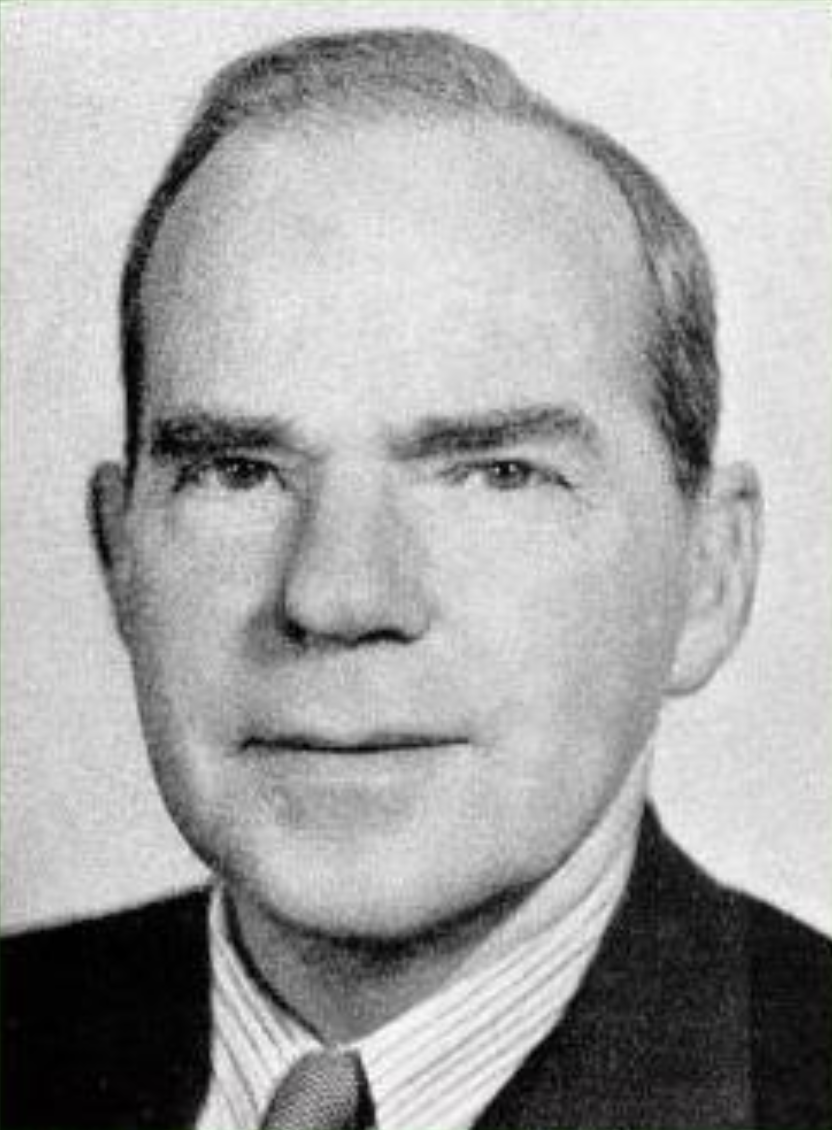
Bostock as Member for Indi

Bostock was decorated twice in 1948 for his war service, in March with the Distinguished Service Order "in recognition of distinguished services whilst in command of air operations in the Borneo Campaign during the period March to September, 1945", and in April with the American Medal of Freedom with Silver Palm. He entered politics in 1949, standing as a Liberal Party candidate for the Federal Division of Indi in Victoria. Elected to the House of Representatives, he retained his seat until being defeated in the 1958 poll. Bostock served on a joint committee for foreign affairs and sometimes came into conflict with his own party on matters of defence policy. He continued to contribute to The Herald while in government. During parliamentary debates in 1951 and again in 1957, Bostock spoke for "an integrated defence force with a single minister", advocating amalgamation of the four separate Departments of Defence, Air, Navy and Army into one Department of Defence, headed by the Minister for Defence. He further proposed that a single Commander-in-Chief lead the Army, Navy and Air Force; the Chief of the General Staff, the Chief of the Naval Staff, and the Chief of the Air Staff would report directly to the new position. In 1973 the single-service departments were abolished in favour of an all-encompassing Department of Defence, and by 1984 a Chief of the Defence Force position had evolved to directly command all three armed services through their respective chiefs.

Bostock's wife Gwendolen died in 1947, and he married 33-year-old Nanette O'Keefe in Melbourne on 1 June 1951; they had three sons. He owned a property near Benalla, in rural Victoria, where he died in 1968. Survived by his second wife and his five children, Bostock was accorded an Air Force funeral and cremated.

== Notes ==
Military offices
New title Post established	Deputy Chief of the Air Staff; 1939–1941	Vacant Title next held by John McCauley in 1942^{1}
New title Command established	Air Officer Commanding RAAF Command; 1942–1945	Command disestablished
Parliament of Australia
Preceded by John McEwen	Member for Indi; 1949–1958	Succeeded by Mac Holten
Notes and references
1. Gillison, Royal Australian Air Force, p. 479
