= Aerospace Operational Support Group RAAF =

Aerospace Operational Support Group
- Active: 2003–2016
- Branch: Royal Australian Air Force
- Part of: Air Command
- Garrison/HQ: RAAF Base Edinburgh
- Motto: Inform to Fight

The Aerospace Operational Support Group was a support group of the Australian Defence Force based at RAAF Base Edinburgh. It was disbanded in 2016, and reformed as the Air Warfare Centre.

AOSG provided integrated, deployable operational support to Air Force, Army Aviation and some Navy combat elements to ensure platform and crew survivability, battle worthiness and mission effectiveness. AOSG delivered information, protection, confidence and assurance to ADF aviation and EW capable Navy platforms and crew from acquisition, through transition into service and full operational capability with the operating Wing or unit.
