= Geoff Brown (RAAF officer) =

Australian air marshal

Geoffrey Charles Brown
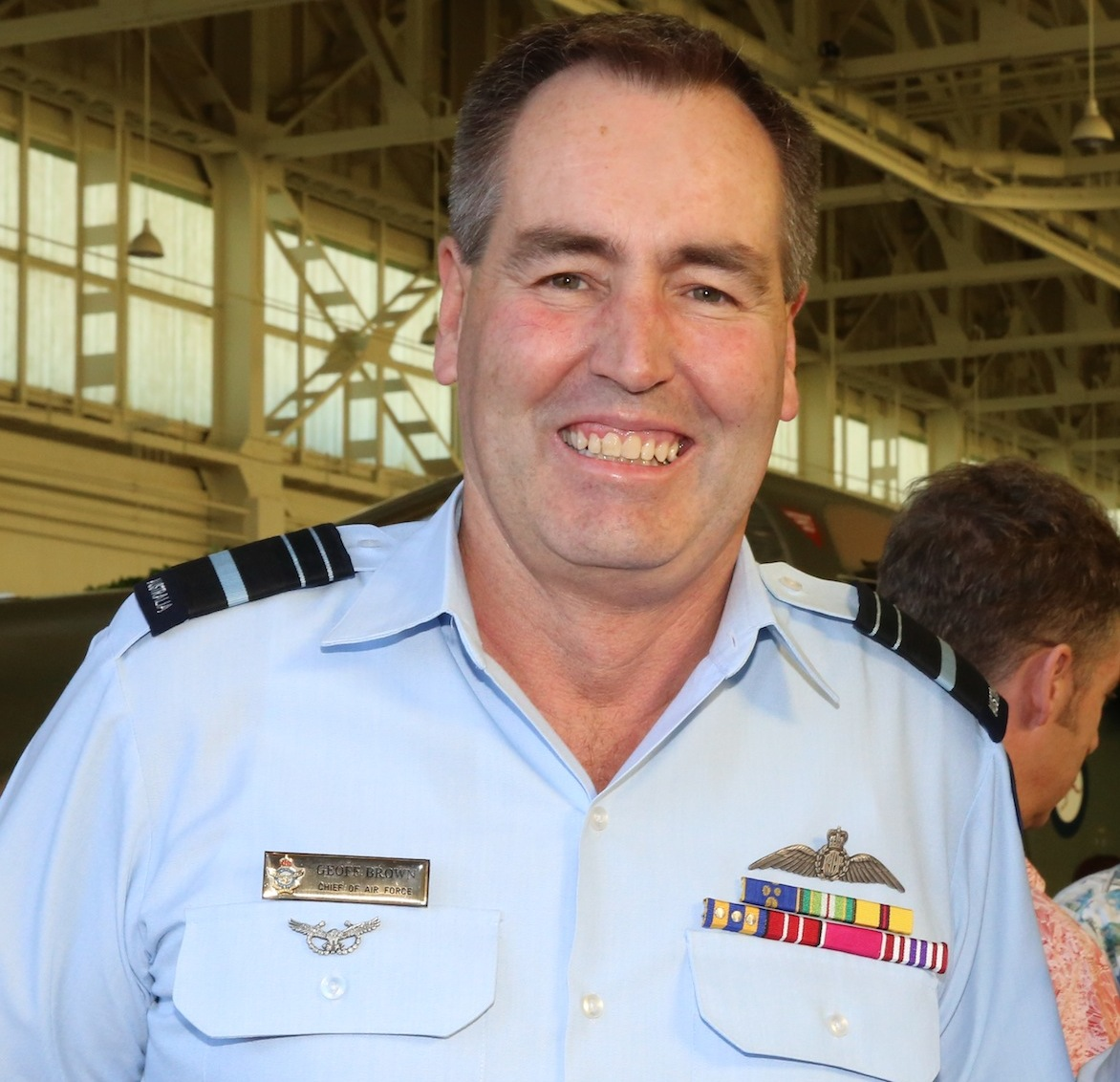
- Brown in 2013
- Born: 1 August 1958 (age 68); Clermont, Queensland
- Military career
- Allegiance: Australia
- Branch: Royal Australian Air Force
- Service years: 1980–2015
- Rank: Air Marshal
- Commands: Chief of Air Force (2011–15); Deputy Chief of Air Force (2008–11); Air Combat Group (2006); No. 82 Wing (2000–03); No. 3 Squadron (1997–00)
- Conflicts: Iraq War
- Awards: Officer of the Order of Australia; Legionnaire of the Legion of Merit (United States); Meritorious Service Medal (Singapore)

Air Marshal Geoffrey Charles Brown, AO (born 1 August 1958) is a retired senior officer of the Royal Australian Air Force. He served as Chief of Air Force from 4 July 2011 until his retirement on 3 July 2015.

== Military career ==
After studying engineering, Brown joined the Royal Australian Air Force in 1980. He became Officer Commanding No. 3 Squadron in 1997 and Officer Commanding No. 82 Wing in 2000. He commanded fighter and air transport operations on Operation Falconer in 2003—for which he was appointed a Member of the Order of Australia and made a Legionnaire of the Legion of Merit by the United States—before becoming Officer Commanding Airborne Early Warning and Control Systems Program Office later that year. Appointed Commander of the Air Combat Group in 2006, he was made Director General Capability Planning at Air Force Headquarters in 2007 and then Deputy Chief of Air Force in 2008.

Brown was appointed Chief of Air Force on 4 July 2011, and was advanced to Officer of the Order of Australia in the 2012 Australia Day Honours for "distinguished service to the Royal Australian Air Force". On 4 April 2014, it was announced that Brown would continue as the Chief of Air Force for an extra twelve months, to July 2015. Brown was a major proponent of Australia purchasing the Lockheed Martin F-35 Lightning II combat aircraft. After retiring from the Air Force, he took a paid position with the plane's manufacturer, as a member of the board of Lockheed Martin Australia.

Military offices
Preceded by Air Marshal Mark Binskin	Chief of Air Force; 2011–2015	Succeeded by Air Marshal Leo Davies
Preceded by Air Vice Marshal John Blackburn	Deputy Chief of Air Force; 2008–2011	Succeeded by Air Vice Marshal Neil Hart
