= Errol McCormack =

Australian air marshal

Errol John McCormack
- Born: 30 August 1941; Bundaberg, Queensland
- Died: 8 April 2024 (aged 82); Canberra, Australian Capital Territory
- Military career
- Allegiance: Australia
- Branch: Royal Australian Air Force
- Service years: 1962–2001
- Rank: Air Marshal
- Commands: Chief of Air Force (1998–01); Deputy Chief of Air Force (1997–98); Integrated Air Defence System (1995–97); No. 82 Wing (1986–88); No. 1 Squadron (1977–79)
- Conflicts: Indonesia–Malaysia confrontation Vietnam War
- Awards: Officer of the Order of Australia

Air Marshal Errol John McCormack, AO (30 August 1941 – 8 April 2024) was a senior commander in the Royal Australian Air Force (RAAF), who served as Chief of Air Force from May 1998 to June 2001.

== Early life ==
McCormack was born in Bundaberg, Queensland, on 30 August 1941 to Horace McCormack and his wife Ida (née Wooldridge). He was educated at Bundaberg State High School.

== Service career ==
McCormack was commissioned in 1963 and served in Malaysia and Singapore during the Indonesia–Malaysia confrontation, and subsequently took part in the Vietnam War. He served as commanding officer of No. 1 Squadron RAAF in the 1980s. He was made commanding officer of No. 82 Wing RAAF in 1987, Director General Force Development Air at Headquarters, Australian Defence Force in Canberra in 1989 and Air Attaché in Washington D. C. in 1993. In 1995 he became Commander for the Integrated Air Defence System at Butterworth in Malaysia.

He was appointed Deputy Chief of Air Force in 1997 and Chief of Air Force in May 1998 before he retired in 2001. In retirement he became Chairman of Chemring Australia Pty Ltd.

He became an Officer of the Order of Australia in 1998.

McCormack died in Canberra on 8 April 2024.

== Honours and awards ==

Officer of the Order of Australia (AO)	1998
Member of the Order of Australia (AM)	1993
General Service Medal	
Vietnam Medal	
Australian Service Medal 1945-1975	
Centenary Medal	2001
Defence Force Service Medal with 4 clasps	for 35–39 years of service
National Medal	for 15 years of service
Australian Defence Medal	2006
Vietnam Campaign Medal (South Vietnam)	
Pingat Jasa Malaysia (Malaysia)	2004

Military offices
Preceded by Air Marshal Les Fisher	Chief of Air Force; 1998–2001	Succeeded by Air Marshal Angus Houston
Preceded by Air Vice Marshal Robert Richardson	Deputy Chief of Air Force; 1997–1998	Succeeded by Air Vice Marshal Brent Espeland
