= RAAF Air Command =

Operational arm of the Royal Australian Air Force

Air Command
- Active: 1942–current
- Country: Australia
- Branch: Royal Australian Air Force
- Garrison/HQ: RAAF Glenbrook
- Mottos: Alert and Ready

Commanders
- Current commander: Air Vice Marshal Harvey Reynolds (Air Commander Australia)

Air Command is the operational arm of the Royal Australian Air Force (RAAF). It is headed by the Air Commander Australia, whose role is to manage and command the RAAF's Force Element Groups (FEGs), which contain the operational capability of the Air Force. Headquarters Air Command is located at RAAF Base Glenbrook.

== Structure ==
Air Command consists of the following FEGs:

- Air Mobility Group
- Air Combat Group
- Surveillance and Response Group
- Combat Support Group
- Air Warfare Centre
- Air Force Training Group

Air Command has a critical strategic role both in peacetime and wartime. It works closely with Air Force Training Group (formerly RAAF Training Command) and the Australian Defence Force's Joint Logistics Command in developing and maintaining the nation's defence capabilities.

== Commanders ==
The Air Commander is responsible for all operational Air Force tasks, and reports to the Chief of Air Force. The Air Commander raises, trains and sustains forces for assignment to operations under the Chief of Joint Operations (CJOPS). Similar arrangements exist with Commander Forces Command (Australian Army) and Commander Australian Fleet (Royal Australian Navy).

Air Command has undergone a number of changes since its formation in May 1942, both in name and location. The following table lists those Air Force officers who have been appointed to lead the command and its headquarters in its various incarnations.

Note: The official title of each group of commanders is listed immediately after the name of the command.

Rank	Name	Post-nominals	Period
HQ Eastern Area Command (Air Officers Commanding)
Air Vice Marshal	William Anderson	CBE, DFC	1942–1943
Air Commodore	Alan Charlesworth	CBE, AFC	1943–1944
Air Commodore	Francis Lukis	CBE	1945–1946
Air Commodore	Leon Lachal	CBE	1946–1947
Air Vice Marshal	Francis Bladin	CBE	1947–1948
Air Vice Marshal	John McCauley	CB, CBE	1949–1953
HQ Home Command (Air Officers Commanding)
Air Vice Marshal	John McCauley	CB, CBE	1953–1954
Air Vice Marshal	Allan Walters	CB, CBE, AFC	1954–1957
Air Vice Marshal	Charles Candy	CB, CBE	1958–1959
HQ Operational Command (Air Officers Commanding)
Air Vice Marshal	Valston Hancock	CB, CBE, DFC	1959–1961
Air Vice Marshal	Frank Headlam	CB, CBE	1961–1962
Air Vice Marshal	Alister Murdoch	CB, CBE	1962–1965
Air Vice Marshal	Colin Hannah	CB, CBE	1965–1967
Air Vice Marshal	Keith Hennock	CB, CBE	1967–1969
Air Vice Marshal	William Townsend	CB, CBE	1969–1973
Air Vice Marshal	Brian Eaton	CB, CBE, DSO & Bar, DFC	1973
Air Vice Marshal	Frederick Robey	AO, CBE	1974–1978
Air Vice Marshal	John Adams	CBE, DFC, AFC	1978–1980
Air Vice Marshal	Michael Ridgway	AFC	1980–1981
Air Vice Marshal	Russell Law		1981–1984
Air Vice Marshal	Bernard Reynolds	AM	1984–1985
Air Vice Marshal	Edward Radford	AO	1985–1987
Air Headquarters Australia (Air Commanders Australia)
Air Vice Marshal	Edward Radford	AO	1987–1990
Air Vice Marshal	Barry Gration	AO, AFC	1990–1992
Air Vice Marshal	Gary Beck	AO	1992–1996
Air Vice Marshal	Peter Nicholson	AO	1996–1996
Headquarters Air Command (Air Commanders Australia)
Air Vice Marshal	Peter Nicholson	AO	1996–1998
Air Vice Marshal	Alan Titheridge	AM	1998–1999
Air Vice Marshal	Peter Criss	AM, AFC	1999–2000
Air Vice Marshal	John Kindler	AO, AFC	2000–2003
Air Vice Marshal	Geoffrey Shepherd	AM	2003–2005
Air Vice Marshal	John Quaife	AM	2005–2007
Air Vice Marshal	Mark Binskin	AM	2007–2008
Air Vice Marshal	Mark Skidmore	AM	2008–2012
Air Vice Marshal	Melvin Hupfeld	DSC	2012–2014
Air Vice Marshal	Gavin Turnbull	AM	2014–2017
Air Vice Marshal	Steve Roberton	DSC, AM	2017–2019
Air Vice Marshal	Joe Iervasi	AM, CSC	2019–2022
Air Vice Marshal	Darren Goldie	AM, CSC	2022–2023
Air Vice Marshal	Glen Braz	AM, CSC, DSM	2023–2026
Air Vice Marshal	Harvey Reynolds	AM	2026–
