= Edward Radford =

English painter (1831–1920)

Edward Radford ARWS
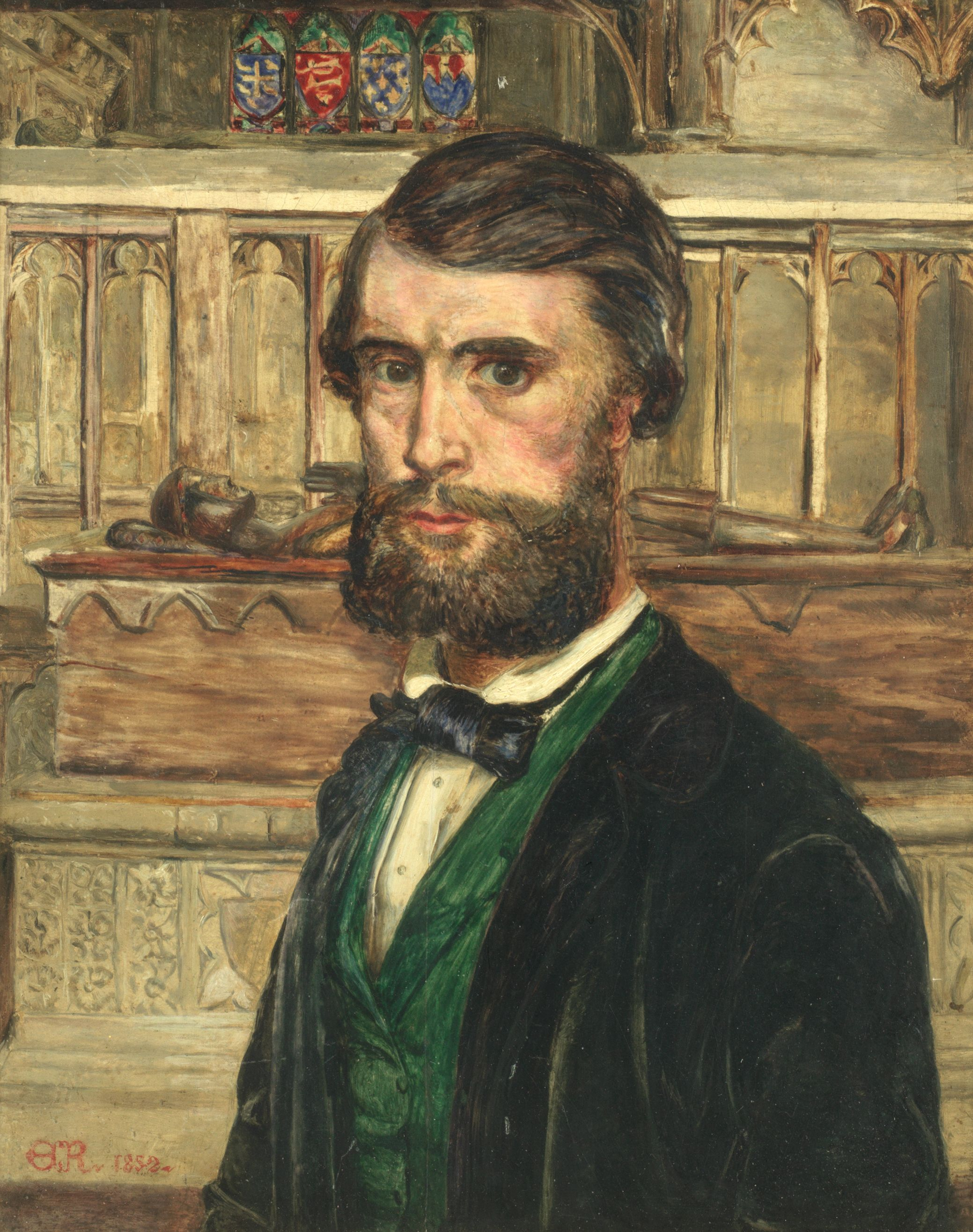
- Self-portrait, 1852
- Born: 1 May 1831; Devonport, Devon, England
- Died: 9 June 1920 (aged 89); Southwick, England
- Family: George Kent Radford (brother)
- Military career
- Branch: Union Army
- Unit: 11th Battery, Ohio Light Artillery
- Conflicts: American Civil War

Edward Radford (1 May 1831 – 9 June 1920) was an English-born architect and painter who was active in England, Canada, and the United States during the mid-late 19th century. He is best known for his architectural work in Toronto and New York City and his watercolour works of classical and genre scenes.

== Early life ==
Radford was born in Devonport, Devon on 22 April 1831, the son of William Radford (1790-1865), a civil engineer, and was educated at Tredegar Square Grammar School, Bow, London. His elder brother was the architect George Kent Radford (1826-1908).

== Biography ==
Radford began his career as an indentured pupil of Thomas Wickstead, a civil engineer, and while in London assisted his brother George who was then employed as an engineer on the construction of the Regent's Canal. Both brothers were practising architecture together in London from 1853 or earlier, and operated an office at 11 Buckingham Street, Strand, London.

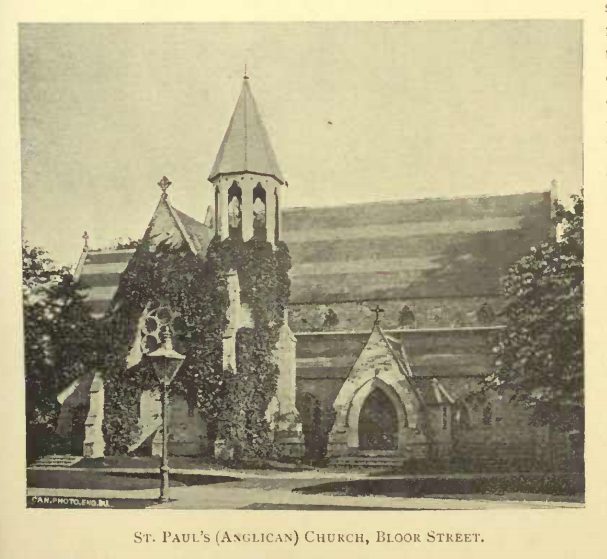
The old church, c. 1891

Radford emigrated to Canada in 1854 with his brother and would remain in Toronto for the next six years. They formed a partnership in Toronto in early 1856, and in 1858 the brothers designed the Anglican church St. Paul's, Bloor Street. By August 1858 their collaboration had ended and Edward was working under his own name. In 1859 Edward submitted a entry in the competition for the Parliament and Departmental Buildings in Ottawa, Ontario, but his design was not premiated.

In early 1861 Radford moved to Cincinnati, Ohio and served with the 11th Ohio Battery during the American Civil War and by 1863 he was working as assistant to William Tinsley, a leading architect in Cincinnati. In 1865 Radford moved to New York City and re-entered into partnership with his brother George, where they worked under the architects Jacob Wrey Mould and Calvert Vaux in designing the structure of the Metropolitan Museum of Art (1868) and the first purpose-built structure of the American Museum of Natural History (1877). Mould described Edward Radford as “an engineer of high scientific attainments to whom we entrusted the constructive portions of the iron work [i. e. the steel structure] of the building”.

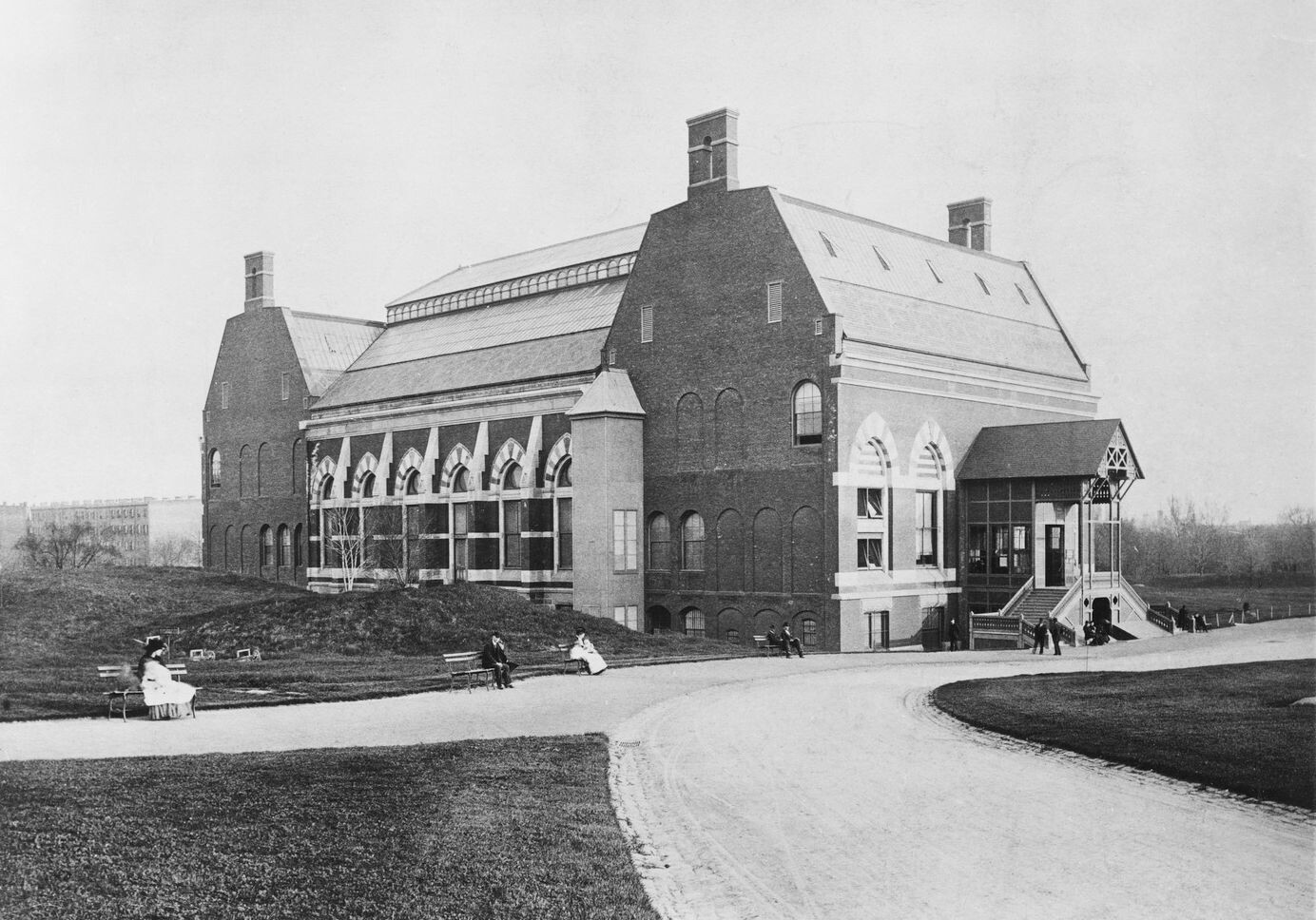
Original building of the Metropolitan Museum of Art designed by Vaux and Mould, built to support expansions, 1880

Radford returned to London in 1885, where he became an Associate of the Royal Watercolour Society and frequently exhibited his paintings at the Royal Academy in London. Radford died at Southwick, Co. Sussex, near Brighton, England on 9 June 1920.

== Main works ==
- St. Paul's, Bloor Street, Toronto (1860)
- Metropolitan Museum of Art, New York City (1868), in partnership with G.K. Radford, under Jacob Wrey Mould and Calvert Vaux
- American Museum of Natural History, New York City (1877), in partnership with G.K. Radford, under Jacob Wrey Mould and Calvert Vaux
