= Air vice-marshal (Australia) =

- An Australian air vice-marshal's rank insignia

- RAAF AVM Command Flag
- Country: Australia
- Service branch: Royal Australian Air Force
- Abbreviation: AVM
- Rank: Two-star
- NATO rank code: OF-7
- Non-NATO rank: O-8
- Formation: 1965
- Next higher rank: Air marshal
- Next lower rank: Air commodore
- Equivalent ranks: Rear admiral (RAN); Major general (Army)

Air vice-marshal (abbreviated as AVM) is the third highest active rank of the Royal Australian Air Force and was created as a direct equivalent of the British Royal Air Force rank of air vice-marshal. It is also considered a two-star rank. The Australian Air Corps adopted the RAF rank system on 9 November 1920 and this usage was continued by its successor, the Royal Australian Air Force.

Air vice-marshal is a higher rank than air commodore and is a lower rank than air marshal. Air vice-marshal is a direct equivalent of rear admiral in the Royal Australian Navy and major general in the Australian Army.

The insignia is one light blue band (on a slightly wider black band) over a light blue band on a black broad band.

The equivalent rank in the Women's Auxiliary Australian Air Force, was 'air chief commandant'.

== See also ==
- Air force officer rank insignia
- Australian Defence Force ranks and insignia
- Ranks of the RAAF
