= 2012 Australia Day Honours =

The 2012 Australia Day Honours were appointments to various orders and honours to recognise and reward good works by Australian citizens. The list was announced on 26 January 2012 by the Governor General of Australia, Quentin Bryce.

The Australia Day Honours are the first of the two major annual honours lists, the first announced to coincide with Australia Day (26 January), with the other being the Queen's Birthday Honours, which are announced on the second Monday in June.

† indicates an award given posthumously.

== Order of Australia ==
=== Companion (AC) ===
Recipient	Citation
The Honourable Justice Virginia Margaret Bell	For eminent service to the judiciary and to the law through leadership in criminal law reform and public policy development, to judicial administration, and as an advocate for the economically and socially disadvantaged.
Richard Bonynge AO CBE	For eminent service to the performing arts as an acclaimed conductor and musical scholar, to opera, and through the collection and preservation of operatic manuscripts.
His Excellency the Honourable Alex Chernov AO QC	For eminent service to the people of Victoria, to the advancement of higher education, particularly the development of academic and administrative programs at the University of Melbourne, through the establishment of the Australia India Institute, and to the judiciary.
His Excellency Malcolm James McCusker AO CVO QC	For eminent service to the people of Western Australia, particularly, through the provision of equitable access to legal representation, as an advocate for sustainable development and education, and through significant philanthropic support for a range of medical research, youth and arts organisations.
Terence Francis Moran AO	For eminent service to the community through public sector leadership, as a significant contributor to policy development, program delivery and effective governance, and to the implementation of contemporary government administration.

=== Officer (AO) ===
==== General Division ====
Recipient	Citation
Malcolm Bruce Begbie	For distinguished service to the international community in the provision of humanitarian relief, particularly through the Crossroads Foundation, and as a significant contributor to UN efforts to connect business organisations with those in need.
Susan Linda Begbie	For distinguished service to the international community in the provision of humanitarian relief, particularly through the Crossroads Foundation, and as a significant contributor to UN efforts to connect business organisations with those in need.
William David Bowtell	For distinguished service to public health through the development and implementation of policy and programs supporting HIV/AIDS awareness and prevention, and as a supporter of global debate on communicable diseases and their impact on human and economic development.
The Honourable Justice Diana Bryant	For distinguished service to the judiciary and to the law, particularly to family law policy reform and practice, through the establishment of the Federal Magistrates' Court, and to the advancement of women in the legal profession.
Dr Rosemary Coates	For distinguished service to the community in the field of reproductive and sexual health through executive roles with national and international health organisations, and to medical education and research.
Dr Ian Darnton-Hill	For distinguished service to the international community, particularly in the areas of public health and nutrition, to disease prevention and health promotion, and as a physician, academic and educator.
Dr Roderick Ian Eddington	For distinguished service to business and commerce through roles with a range of national and international economic, trade, infrastructure development and transport organisations.
Dr Robert Lindsay Every	For distinguished service to business, particularly through leadership roles in the Australian steel industry, as an advocate for corporate social responsibility, and to the community as a contributor to educational, charitable and cultural organisations.
Kerry Hill	For distinguished service to architecture, particularly as an ambassador for Australian design in South East Asia, and as an educator and mentor.
Caroline Jennifer Hogg	For distinguished service to the Parliament of Victoria, particularly in the areas of multiculturalism, health, education, arts and rural affairs, and to mental health through the development of national programs to support youth.
Professor the Honourable Michael Hugh Lavarch	For distinguished service to the law and legal education, particularly in the areas of native title, human rights and constitutional law, as an educator, through roles with professional organisations, and to the community.
The Honourable Robyn Ann Layton QC	For distinguished service to the law and to the judiciary, particularly through the Supreme Court of South Australia, as an advocate for Indigenous, refugee and children's rights, and to the community.
Emeritus Professor Kwong Chiu Lee Dow AM	For distinguished service to education in Australia as an administrator, scholar and contributor to major curriculum reforms, through executive roles with education advisory bodies, and to the community.
Professor Stuart Forbes Macintyre	For distinguished service to the social sciences and to the humanities as a leading academic in the areas of 19th and 20th century Australian history, particularly through advancing the understanding of social and political life, and as an author, researcher and mentor.
Professor Charles Dunlop Mackenzie	For distinguished service to veterinary pathology and to medical science through significant contributions to filarial disease eradication in the peoples of Equatorial Africa, and as a researcher and educator.
Andrew E. F. Metcalfe	For distinguished service to public sector leadership through contributions to Australia's international relations and to major public policy development and program implementation in the areas of immigration, Australian citizenship, cultural diversity and national security, and to the community.
Stephen Hibbert Newton	For distinguished service to education in the independent schools sector, through executive roles with professional organisations and advisory bodies, and to the development of educational development opportunities with China.
Ricky Thomas Ponting	For distinguished service to the sport of cricket as a leading player at the national and international level, and to the community through the establishment of the Ponting Foundation.
Dr David John Pugsley	For distinguished service to renal medicine, particularly the prevention and treatment of kidney disease in global Indigenous populations, to international medical associations, and as a mentor.
Fergus Denis Ryan	For distinguished service to the business and finance sectors as an executive and adviser, and to the community through philanthropic contributions to cultural, social welfare and educational organisations.
Dr David James Skellern	For distinguished service to science and engineering as a leading researcher, and to the design and development of world-leading information technology communications applications.
The Reverend Father William James Uren	For distinguished service to education as a philosopher and bioethicist, as a commentator on contemporary issues in Australian society, as a scholar and mentor, and to the Catholic Church in Australia.

==== Military Division ====
Branch	Recipient	Citation
Army	Major General Timothy Joseph McOwan DSC CSM	For distinguished service to the Australian Army in the fields of operations and Special Forces, particularly as Special Operations Commander Australia.
Army	Lieutenant General Brian Ashley Power AM CSC	For distinguished service as Commander of the 1st Division, Commander Training Command – Army and head Military Strategic Commitments.
Army	Major General Michael David Slater DSC AM CSC	For distinguished service as head of the Defence Personnel Executive, Commander 1st Division and head of the Queensland Flood Recovery Task Force.
Air Force	Air Marshal Geoffrey Charles Brown AM	For distinguished service to the Royal Australian Air Force in senior command and staff appointments.

=== Member (AM) ===
==== General Division ====
Recipient	Citation
Dr Sandra Doreen Anderson	For service to respiratory medicine as an academic and researcher, and to the community through the Asthma Foundation of NSW.
Noel Graham Ashcroft	For service to the public sector in Western Australia, and to the promotion and development of trade and industry links between Australia, Britain and Europe.
Maria Louise Atkinson	For service to the construction and real estate sector, particularly as a leader and contributor to environmentally sustainable building development in Australia.
Emeritus Professor Hans-Albert Bachor	For service to science in the field of quantum optics as a researcher and educator, and to the Australian Youth Science Forum.
Emeritus Professor John Patrick Baird	For service to higher education through the Australian Defence Force Academy, and to the discipline of engineering as an academic and researcher.
David Mark Balkin	For service to the community through leadership and board executive roles with a range of Jewish organisations, and to business.
The Honourable Rosemary Anne Balmford	For service to the judiciary, the practice of law in Victoria, and to the study of ornithology.
Dr Alan Bartholomai	For service to the advancement of science, particularly through administrative roles with the Queensland Museum.
Simon Christopher Bartlett	For service to engineering, particularly to the electricity supply industry in Queensland, and to professional organisations.
John Jeffrey Bastian	For service to the community of South Australia through a range of economic and social development organisations, and to business.
Michael Peter Baumann	For service to the community of Queensland as a magistrate and through contributions to court procedures and practices, to the legal aid sector, and to sporting organisations.
Maggie Beer	For service to the tourism and hospitality industries as a cook, restaurateur and author, and to the promotion of Australian produce and cuisine.
Dr Jillian Benson	For service to medicine through contributions in the field of mental health, particularly for refugees and people seeking asylum, and to the Indigenous community of South Australia.
The Honourable Jennifer Margaret Boland	For service to the judiciary through the Family Court of Australia, to legal education, and to the community, particularly through social welfare organisations.
Glen Francis Boreham	For service to business and to the information technology sector, to professional associations, and to the arts.
Professor Roderick William Boswell	For service to science in the field of plasma physics as an academic and researcher and through contributions to the international scientific community.
Debra Louise Brennocks	For service to the international community, particularly through roles supporting children and young people and as Co-Founder and Director of the Sandra Jones Centre in Zimbabwe.
Robert Andrew Brice	For service to business, particularly to the tourism industry, and through philanthropic support for tertiary education institutions in Queensland.
Dr Susan Victoria Briggs	For service to conservation and the environment through scientific, research and advisory roles supporting natural resources management and policy development.
Michael Paul Brosowski	For service to the international community, particularly young people, as founder and director of the Blue Dragon Children's Foundation in Vietnam.
Professor Philip Ronald Brown	For service to education in the disciplines of accounting and finance, and to professional associations.
Dr Michele Denise Bruniges	For service to public administration through executive roles, and as a contributor to reform in the education sector at state and national levels.
Robert Bryan	For service to the mining industry in a range of executive roles, and to the community through philanthropic contributions to arts, heritage and educational organisations.
Dr John Michael Buckingham†	For service to medicine, particularly the care of women undergoing treatment of breast cancer, through executive roles with BreastScreen ACT, and to medical education.
David Rhett Butler	For service to the international community through the provision of sustainable water treatment solutions for humanitarian projects and emergency disaster relief efforts.
Peter Charles Byers	For service to educational administration, to the arts, and to business.
Professor Ivan William Caple	For service to veterinary science and education through national consultative roles on animal welfare and through professional organisations.
William Barrett Capp	For service to business, and to the community through a range of philanthropic, social welfare and educational organisations.
Christine Barbara Cawsey	For service to secondary education in New South Wales as a principal and through professional associations.
Robert Foo Hee Chong OAM	For service to the Chinese community in Victoria, to local government, and to the City of Whitehorse.
Professor Wai Fong Chua	For service to tertiary education as an administrator, through research and leadership in the discipline of accounting and as a mentor.
The Honourable Theo Russell Cooper	For service to the Parliament of Queensland, to local government, and to the Roma and Crows Nest communities.
Andrew Charles Darbyshire	For service to the community as a supporter of research into child-related brain conditions, through contributions to special needs children and their families, and to the arts.
George Robert Davey	For service to public administration in New South Wales, particularly the primary industry sector, to the development of health and food standards, and to professional associations.
Professor Peter Eric Davies	For service to conservation and the environment as a contributor to national water policy development and through research of Australia's rivers and waterways.
Douglas Thomas Dean	For service to business and commerce through the development and provision of sustainable waste management and resource recovery solutions, and to the community.
Dr Grahame Robert Deane	For service to medicine in the Gunnedah region and to professional associations, particularly the Australian Divisions of General Practice.
Professor Michael Bruce Doreau	For service to engineering, to professional education and research, and to the community, particularly through the RedR disaster relief organisation.
Professor Paul Anthony Fagan	For service to medicine as an otological skull-based surgeon, to a range of professional associations, and to medical education.
Dr Lorenzo Faraone	For service to science as an educator and researcher, particularly in the field of micro-electronics, and to professional associations.
Dr John Michael Fenwick	For service to engineering through a range of executive roles, to the design and construction of major transport infrastructure, and to education.
Professor John Frederick Forbes	For service to medicine in the field of breast cancer research, to the development of improved clinical practice standards, and to the community.
Dominic Victor Fracaro	For service to the community of the Northern Territory as a supporter of a range of charitable, historical, educational and sporting organisations, to the visual arts, and to business.
Dr Geoffrey Goodwin	For service to engineering through contributions to the ships and submarines of the Royal Australian Navy.
Professor Martin Andrew Green	For service to science education as an academic and researcher, particularly through the development of photovoltaic solar cell technology, and to professional associations.
Professor Jeanette Anne Hacket	For service to tertiary education administration at Curtin University, to the fostering of links with overseas institutions, and to the promotion of equitable educational services for regional communities.
Richard Michael Haddock	For service to business through executive roles with financial institutions, to the law, and to the community, particularly as an adviser to the social welfare organisations of the Catholic Church in Australia.
Winthrop Professor Peter Edwin Hartmann	For service to science and education as an academic and researcher in the biochemistry and physiology of human lactation.
Vera Lillian Hatton	For service to the museums sector through the Lady Denman Heritage Complex, and as a supporter of youth, social welfare and historical organisations in the Shoalhaven region.
The Honourable Peter Cadden Heerey QC	For service to the judiciary through the Federal Court of Australia, to the development of legal principle in the areas of intellectual property, trade practices, and military law, and to the community.
Graeme John Henderson	For services to maritime archaeology in Western Australia through the documentation and preservation of Australia's underwater cultural heritage, to international professional associations, and to the community.
Diana Marie Hill	For service to the international community, particularly through the United Nations International Children's Emergency Fund, and to youth, health and social welfare organisations.
Associate Professor Renate Thelma Howe	For service to higher education and to the arts through administrative and academic roles, and to the community, particularly through heritage and cultural organisations.
James Forrest Hughes	For service to the community through executive roles with Apex Clubs of Australia, to the insurance industry, and as a supporter of community health, social welfare and arts organisations.
Graham John Jahn	For service to architecture, particularly through the promotion of excellence in urban design and planning, to professional associations, and to local government and the arts.
The Honourable Gregory Reginald James QC	For service to the judiciary and to the law as a contributor to mental health reform, to the administration of criminal justice, and to the international community.
Brian Charles Jeffriess	For service to the fishing and aquaculture industries as a contributor to the sustainable management and harvesting of Australian fisheries and through national and international professional associations.
Dr John Patrick Keneally	For service to medicine as a clinician and academic, to the specialty of paediatric anaesthesia and pain management, and through advisory roles with public health organisations.
Bryan Andrew Keon-Cohen QC	For service to the law, and to the legal profession, through the advancement of social justice and the protection of human rights, particularly in the areas of environmental and indigenous law reform.
Joseph Khattar	For service to business and to the Lebanese community in Australia through a range of executive roles, and as a supporter of social welfare and church organisations.
Frances Mary Kilgariff	For service to local government in the Northern Territory, to the economic and social advancement of the community of the Alice Springs region, and through contributions to indigenous, tourism and community health organisations.
Sandra Jenene Lambert	For service to public administration in the Australian Capital Territory in the areas of disability, community housing, multicultural relations, health and welfare, and as a mentor.
Jeffrey Lee	For service to conservation and the environment of the Northern Territory, particularly through advocacy roles for the inclusion of the Djok Kundjeyhmi country as a World Heritage area within Kakadu National Park.
Professor Sandra Chérie Legg	For service to nursing as a clinician, educator and through executive roles, to the development of health care management systems nationally and internationally, and to the community.
Professor Geoffrey John Lindell	For service to legal education as an academic, particularly in the area of Australian constitutional law and through a range of professional associations.
The Honourable Kevin Edmund Lindgren QC	For service to the judiciary and administration of justice through the Federal Court of Australia, and to legal education in the area of commercial law.
Emeritus Scientia Professor Eugenie Ruth Lumbers	For service to the medical sciences in the fields of physiology and pharmacology as a researcher, academic and administrator, and to the community.
Kenneth James McAlpine	For service to education, particularly through executive roles with the New South Wales Secondary Principals' Council, as an educator, and to the community.
Ian Roy McBean	For service to the livestock industry in the Northern Territory, to the improvement of animal health, and to the Australian Brahman Breeders Association.
Dr Tracey Therese McDonald	For service to nursing, particularly in the area of aged care, through advisory roles with the United Nations Expert Groups, and to the development of public health and social welfare policy.
James McGowan	For service to public administration in Queensland through the development and implementation of public sector management and training reforms and to improved service delivery.
Professor Peter Balshaw McPhee	For service to tertiary education and administration, to the discipline of history as an academic and author, and to professional associations.
Susan Patricia Marriott	For service to conservation and the environment through the Secretariat for International Landcare, particularly the development of programs dealing with climate change and rural land management.
Roydon John Masters	For service to sport through executive roles with the Australian Sports Commission, to the sport of Rugby League football, and to journalism.
Dr Timothy Hamish Mathew	For service to medicine in the field of renal disease and transplantation through research and advisory roles, and to Kidney Health Australia.
Professor Jagannath Mazumdar	For service to applied mathematics and biomedical engineering as a researcher and educator, and to the Indian community.
Professor Ian Thomas Meredith	For service to medicine in the field of cardiology as a clinician and researcher, and through advisory roles with a range of public health organisations.
Emeritus Professor Louise Brearley Messer	For service to the dental profession, particularly in the field of paediatric dentistry, as a clinician, academic and researcher.
Dr George Alexander Michell	For service to architectural history and conservation as a scholar, author and mentor, as an interpreter of Indian culture, and through the promotion of Australia-India relations.
Associate Professor Brian John Miller	For service to medicine as a general and colorectal surgeon, to trauma education, as a mentor, and through contributions to improved surgical techniques.
Simon David Mordant	For service to the arts and to the cultural environment of Australia through philanthropic and executive roles, and to the community.
Stirling Austin Mortlock	For service to the sport of Rugby Union football, particularly as Captain of the Wallabies.
Professor Kathryn Nance North	For service to medicine in the field of neuromuscular and neurogenetics research, paediatrics and child health as a clinician and academic, and to national and international professional associations.
Dr Harry Frank Oxer ASM	For service to hyperbaric and underwater medicine, to medical education, and continuing service to St John Ambulance in Western Australia.
Frank Pace	For service to business through executive roles with national and international organisations involved in the egg production industry, and to the community.
David John Parker	For service to public administration through contributions to economic policy, as an Australian representative to world economic forums, to Kidney Health Australia and to people with kidney disease.
Dr Rodney David Pearce	For service to medicine as a general practitioner, through contributions to national medical organisations, and to education.
Emeritus Professor John Douglas Penrose	For service to the community through the Volunteer Task Force of Western Australia, and to education in the field of marine science and physics.
Emeritus Professor Roslyn Louise Pesman	For service to tertiary education through academic and administrative roles, particularly the study of the history of Italian migrants in Australia, and to the community.
Donald Geoffrey Phillips	For service to business through roles with Regional Development Australia, to vocational training organisations, and to the community of Taree.
Prudence Howard Power	For service to community health as an advocate for equity and access to health care services, to the development of professional standards, and to nursing.
Emeritus Professor Alan Duncan Reid	For service to education as an academic and researcher, particularly through contributions to the development of state and national curriculum policy, and to professional associations.
Ian Andrew Renard	For service to the tertiary education sector, particularly in the area of governance policy development, to business and commerce, and to a range of arts and cultural institutions.
David Graham Russell RFD QC	For service to the National Party of Australia and to politics, to taxation law and legal education, and to the community.
Dr Rhonda Dawn Sharp	For service to education as an academic and researcher, to the study of economics, and to women.
George Benjamin Smith	For service to the sport of Rugby Union football as a player at the national and international level, and to the community.
Professor Mandyam Veerambudi Srinivasan	For service to visual and sensory neuroscience through the Queensland Brain Institute, as an academic, researcher and mentor, and to the national and international scientific community.
Dr Philip Jon Stephenson†	For service to the earth sciences as an academic, to the Australian National Antarctic Research Expeditions organisation, and to environmental and resource management.
Robert James Stewart	For service to the community through fostering collaboration between business and the tertiary education sector, to health and technology organisations, and to the sport of rowing.
Dr Edward Richard Street	For service to dentistry and to the dental profession, as an oral and maxillofacial surgeon, to medicine, and to the international community.
Rosalind Maybanke Strong	For service to women through the United Nations entity for gender equality and the empowerment of women, to the arts, heritage and education sectors, and to the community.
Dr Anne Eliza Sved Williams	For service to medicine, as a perinatal and infant mental health specialist, to medical education, and through contributions to professional organisations.
Inaam Tabaa	For service to industrial relations in New South Wales, and to the community, particularly through the Australian Council of Women Affairs.
Professor Frank Hamilton Talbot	For service to environmental protection through the Sydney Institute of Marine Science, to coral reef research, to museum development and management, and to international scientific organisations.
Professor S. Caroline Taylor	For service to the community through roles with social welfare organisations as a researcher, and to women's studies as an author.
Adjunct Associate Professor Patricia Helen Trott	For service to physiotherapy through administrative and academic roles and through a range of professional associations at the state and national level.
Professor Martin Tsamenyi	For service to maritime and fisheries law in the Asia-Pacific region, through the Australian National Centre for Ocean Resources and Security, and to legal education.
Phillip John Tuckerman	For service to people with a disability through the provision of employment opportunities for young people, and to disability services.
Professor Frank John Vajda	For service to neuropharmacology, particularly in the specialty of epilepsy as a clinician and researcher, to medical education, and to the Jewish community.
Murray Mack Walker	For service to the community through a range of executive roles with conservation, health, educational and sporting organisations, and to advertising.
Patrick Ernest Walsh	For service to the international community in the Asia-Pacific region as an advocate for human rights, particularly in Timor-Leste.
Professor Garry James Walter	For service to medicine in the field of adolescent mental health, to medical education, and as a contributor to professional publications.
Rosemary Warmington	For service to the community of South Australia, particularly through advancing the recognition and rights of family carers and as an advocate for people with mental illness.
Associate Professor Alan John Watson	For service to the international community as Founder of the Katoke Trust for Overseas Aid, to the people of Tanzania, and to education.
David Wittner	For service to business, particularly footwear retailing, to professional organisations, to a range of charitable and medical research groups, and to Rotary.
Graeme Thomas Wood	For service to business, particularly the tourism industry, and through philanthropic support for young people and tertiary education institutions in Queensland.
Carol Joan Woodrow	For service to the performing arts, to youth theatre as an artistic director, and to the development of women playwrights in Australia.
Professor Dennis K. S. Yue	For service to medicine in the field of diabetes and endocrinology, as a clinician and researcher and through advisory roles with national and international organisations.

==== Military Division ====
Branch	Recipient	Citation
Navy	Rear Admiral David Lance Johnston	For exceptional service in the Royal Australian Navy in senior Naval and Joint operational staff appointments.
Navy	Captain Colin John Lawrence	For exceptional service in the field of Aerospace Engineering in the Royal Australian Navy.
Navy	Commodore Richard Temple Menhinick CSC	For exceptional service to the Royal Australian Navy as Director General Navy Transformation and Innovation and Commandant of the Australian Command and Staff College.
Army	Brigadier Phillip Keith Bridie	For exceptional service to the Australian Army as Senior Project Officer at Headquarters Training Command and the Commander of the 8th Brigade.
Army	Brigadier Damian Michael Cantwell	For exceptional service in the fields of support to Army operations and Army's future concepts and development.
Army	Lieutenant Colonel Cate McGregor	For exceptional service to the Australian Army as Director of the Land Warfare Studies Centre.
Army	Lieutenant Colonel Matthew Richard Pearse	For exceptional service as the Staff Officer Grade One Doctrine, Land Warfare Development Centre, Commanding Officer of the 1st Combat Engineer Regiment and Commanding Officer of the Australian Tank Force Rotation 8 (Rear).
Air Force	Group Captain Kathryn Grace Dunn	For exceptional service to the Royal Australian Air Force in the field of education and training.
Air Force	Group Captain Steven Peter Roberton	For exceptional service to the Royal Australian Air Force in the fields of command, capability development and acquisition, and capability introduction and management.

=== Medal (OAM) ===
==== General Division ====
Recipient	Citation
Norman Hamilton Abbey	For service to people with a disability, particularly through the Shannon Park Foundation.
Robert Edward Adam	For service to people who are deaf or hard of hearing through executive and administrative roles.
Michael Ali	For service to veterans and their families, and to the community of Helensburgh.
Suzanne Kate Alvarez	For service to the arts through the Australian Storytelling Guild.
Judith Ann Anderson	For service to the Queensland Ballet through administrative roles, and to women.
John Bernard Arthur	For service to Catholic Religious Congregations and to Indigenous education through advisory and leadership roles.
Dr Kenneth Vernon Bailey	For service to the community of the Australian Capital Territory.
Shayne Donald Baker	For service to the community, particularly through the Royal Life Saving Society, and to education.
Dr Appupillay Balasubramaniam	For service to the Hindu community of Australia.
Lesley Adele Barnes	For service to the preservation of Australia's heritage, and to the community.
Ross Douglas Barrett	For service to the building and construction industry.
Brian Stirtevant Barrow	For service to the law in Victoria as a magistrate, and to youth.
The Reverend Dr Warren Keith Bartlett	For service to the Uniting Church in Australia, and to the community.
Thomas Baxter	For service to engineering through executive roles, and to the community.
Gail Evelyn Beck	For service to the Indigenous community of Perth through roles in the areas of health, social welfare and native title.
Wayne McDonald Bell	For service to the Indigenous community through the Victorian Aboriginal Legal Service.
Dr Colin Gabriel Benjamin	For service to the community through roles with social welfare organisations, and to business.
Trevor John Bennett	For service to the community of Narooma, and to the Starlight Children's Foundation.
Gunars Eizens Berzzarins	For service to the Latvian community, and to sport as an administrator and journalist.
Dr Robert John Black RFD	For service to medicine, particularly in the field of otolaryngology.
David Ernest Blackwell	For service to the accountancy profession, and to the community.
Warren Sydney Blee	For service to the pharmaceutical industry, and to the Australian Naval Cadets.
Bridget Block†	For service to the community of Mosman.
Murray Michael Block	For service to the community of Mosman.
Louise Anne Blue	For service to children and young people with a disability.
John A. Boyle	For service to the community, particularly through the Warrandyte Festival.
Lilliane Olive Brady	For service to local government, and to the community of Cobar.
Nola Frances Bransgrove	For service to the transport and logistics industry, to women, and to the community.
Holly Louise Brennan	For service to the community through organisations promoting the welfare and rights of children.
John Joseph Brennan	For service to the surf lifesaving movement through a range of executive roles, and to the community.
Torah Bright	For service to sport as a Gold Medallist at the Vancouver 2010 Winter Olympic Games.
Peter John Brooke	For service to the community as a pilot with the Royal Flying Doctor Service in Queensland.
Keith James Brownbill	For service to the community of the Morwell region through a range of organisations.
Maxwell Gordon Browning	For service to the community of Armidale.
Ronald Alan Brownlees	For service to local government, and to a range of health and community organisations.
Paul William Brunton	For service to Australian history through curatorial roles with the Mitchell Library.
Dr Michael Paul Brydon	For service to medicine as a paediatrician, and to the community.
Lorraine Ann Buhk	For service to the community, particularly through the surf lifesaving movement.
Robert Butterfield	For service to the community of Palm Beach.
Terence Francis Byrne	For service to veterans and their families, and to the community of Launceston.
Andrew Hugh Campbell†	For service to surveying through professional associations, and to the community.
Joseph Anthony Caputo	For service to the Italian community in Australia, to the Victorian Multicultural Commission, and to local government.
Susan Mary Carr	For service to youth through Girl Guides Australia.
Sister Maria Casey	For service to the community as Postulator for the Canonisation of Mary MacKillop, and to the Catholic Church in Australia.
Heather Margaret Champion de Crespigny	For service to the Australian Red Cross.
Eve Chappell	For service to the preservation of local history through the Glen Innes and District Historical Society.
Professor Kevin Cheney	For service to medicine in the field of haematology.
Kerry Child	For service to local government, and to the community of Bellingen.
John Graham Christmass	For service to music education in Western Australia, and to choral performance.
Professor Stephen John Clarke	For service to medicine in the disciplines of oncology and pharmacology.
Norma Veronica Clinch	For service to nursing, and to The Alfred Hospital.
Barry Clugston	For service to the community of regional Victoria through a range of water industry and environmental organisations.
Stephen James Cocker	For service to veterans in Tasmania.
Murray Leslie Coleman	For service to the building and construction industry.
Debra Kathleen Colyer	For service to community health through the PKU Association of New South Wales.
Barry Maxwell Comben	For service to the automotive industry.
Gregory John Conkey	For service to the community of Wagga Wagga.
Norma Madeline Connolly	For service to the sport of basketball through administrative and coaching roles.
Dr Brian Douglas Cooke	For service to conservation and the environment through biological management programs for rabbit population control.
David Alan Costello	For service to the licensed club industry in New South Wales, and through contributions to charitable organisations.
Dr Hamilton Russell Cowie	For service to the community as an historian and advocate for restoration, and as an educator and academic.
Squadron Leader Robert Barson Cowper DFC	For service to veterans and their families through a range of ex-service organisations.
Catherine Dorothy Craig	For service to the Penrith Community Kitchen.
Dr Ernest Humphry Cramond MBE	For service to medicine as a general practitioner and through the Australian Medical Association.
Sister Margaret Anne Culhane	For service to the international community, particularly refugees from Asia and Africa, to women, and as an educator.
Denis Francis Dack	For service to the community of the Fraser Coast through roles with a range of organisations.
William Dalglish	For service to veterans and their families through the organisation of Australian representatives at international Anzac Day services.
Drew John Dangar	For service to the Indigenous community through a range of health and welfare programs, and as a foster carer.
Dinah Danon	For service to the community through the National Council of Jewish Women of Australia.
Malcolm Carey Daubney	For service to people with a vision impairment through Vision Australia.
Shirley Norma Davison	For service to the Walcha region, particularly through the Amaroo Local Aboriginal Land Council.
Ian Lionel Debenham	For service to the research, documentation and preservation of Australia's aviation history and heritage.
Victoria Maria de Haas	For service to people with an intellectual disability through the Activ Foundation.
Roma Lois Dix	For service to the visually impaired, the performing arts, and to the community of Mittagong.
Robert Phillip Dobson AFSM	For service to the community through voluntary roles with a range of service organisations.
Grant Stephen Dorrington BEM	For service to the community through contributions to road safety, and to the management and development of the Australian Football League in Western Australia.
James Garth Doyle	For service to the community through the Sisters of Charity Outreach Foundation.
Graham William Dunstan	For service to veterans and their families through the Vietnam Veterans Association of Australia.
Jamie Paul Durie	For service to the community as an ambassador and supporter of a range of charitable and environmental organisations, and as a landscape designer.
Graeme Keith Dyer	For service to the road transport industry, and to the community of Wellington.
The Reverend Dr Denis Edwards	For service to the Catholic Archdiocese of Adelaide, and to theological education.
Michael John Edwards	For service to the protective security industry through the development of training programs.
Peter Nicolaus Ellis	For service to the arts through collection and preservation of Australian folk history and heritage.
Dr David Denton Evans	For service to medicine as an infectious diseases physician.
Peter James Evans	For service to the community of Newcastle and the Hunter Region, to business, and to youth.
Peter John Fenton	For service to the Australian film industry as a sound engineer.
James Francis Field	For service to the community of Yass, and to Lions International.
Harold Finger	For service to the community through a range of Jewish organisations.
Colonel Graeme William Finney	For service to the community of Wagga Wagga through a range of charitable organisations.
Emeritus Professor Brian Hinton Fletcher	For service to education as an academic, researcher and author in the discipline of Australian history.
William Michael Flynn	For service to the community of Ballarat, and to the Catholic Church in Australia through administrative roles.
James Martin Ford	For service to the sport of cricket in the Northern Territory.
Joan Rosemary Ford	For service to business and commerce, to human resource management, and to equal employment initiatives.
Judith Ann Friend	For service to the arts through voluntary roles with the Art Gallery of New South Wales and the Museum of Contemporary Art.
Paul Hamilton Funnell	For service to the plumbing industry.
John Edward Gall	For service to the banking and finance sector, and to the community.
Dr Donat Selwyn Gallagher	For service to the arts, to education, and to the community of Townsville.
Father Paul Bernard Gardiner	For service to the community in the fields of religion, as Postulator for the Canonisation of Mary MacKillop, and to the Catholic Church in Australia.
Dr Dorothy Mary Gibson-Wilde	For service to heritage preservation in Queensland.
Stephen John Glasson	For service to the sport of lawn bowls as a coach and player.
Dr Alan James Goble	For service to medicine as a cardiologist, and to the National Heart Foundation in Victoria.
Jennifer Ann Gorrel	For service to the community of the Riverina through a range of health and social welfare organisations.
Gerrard James Gosens	For service to people who are blind or vision impaired, and to sport.
Josette Gostin	For service to the community through a range of Jewish organisations.
Joan Alison Grace	For service to mental health care through the Francis Foundation.
Donald Charles Graham	For service to the community of Mackay through a range of organisations.
Shirley Edith Green	For service to music through the Yeppoon Choral Society.
Leigh Kenneth Hall	For service to the community of South Australia through local government, business and health organisations.
Alice May Halloran	For service to aged welfare in New South Wales.
Colin Roy Hamilton	For service to the sport of hockey, and to the community of Rockhampton.
Neil Hamilton	For service to local government, and to the community of Moorabbin.
Peter Hansen	For service to the building and construction industry, and to the community.
Ina Patricia Harbison	For service to marine conservation in South Australia.
Arnold Rex Harcourt	For service to the community as an author, researcher and historian, particularly of the founding and early days of Melbourne and Victoria.
Leigh Walter Hardinge	For service to local government, and to the community of Victoria through executive roles with a range of service organisations.
Joan Margaret, Lady Hardy	For service to the community through support for a range of charitable organisations.
Dr Michael Allan Harrison	For service to veterinary science.
Raymond Jack Hart	For service to veterans and their families, particularly through the Spitfire Association.
Raymond Kenneth Harty	For service to the building and construction industry through vocational training and education, and to the community.
Joan May Hausfeld	For service to the community of Tamworth through a range of voluntary roles.
Francis Laurence Heerey	For service to veterans through the Royal Australian Air Force Association.
Graham Kent Hill	For service to the community of the Sutherland district.
Elizabeth Francesca Ho	For service to education through the Bob Hawke Prime Ministerial Centre at the University of South Australia, and to women.
Geoffrey Raynor Hook	For service to the print media as a political and social commentator, and as a cartoonist.
Robert Eric Horsell	For service to cricket administration.
Dr Henry Arthur Hudson	For service to museums, to heritage preservation, and to the community of Queenscliff.
Owen Ray Hughan	For service to the sport of basketball as a player, coach and administrator.
Warren Desmond Humphries	For service to the community of Labrador, particularly through roles with the Men's Shed.
Dr Francis Thomas Hurley	For service to the community of Ballarat, and to education.
Jack Huxtable	For service to the sport of Australian Rules football, and to the community of Morwell.
Francesco Incani	For service to medicine as a surgeon, and to the Italian community in Victoria.
Bawa Singh Jagdev	For service to the Sikh community in Australia.
Richard Jeffreys	For service to veterans and their families through the Coorparoo Sub-Branch of the Returned and Services League of Australia, and to local government.
Davina Anne Johnson	For service to community health through the Royal Children's Hospital Auxiliary.
Joyce Sheila Johnston	For service to the hospitality and tourism industry, and to the community.
Clayton William Jones	For service to education as Headmaster of Girton Grammar School, and to the community of Bendigo.
Helen Kalis	For service to the community of Tasmania.
John Warwick Kean	For service to the community through education, medical research, trade and charitable organisations.
Kenneth John Kennett	For service to the performing arts, particularly theatre, as an actor, writer and director.
Peter Jeffrey Kirk	For service to the community through a range of health and social welfare organisations.
Dr Bengt Korman	For service to the community, particularly through the Holocaust Institute of Western Australia.
Loula Kostos	For service to the Royal Children's Hospital as a volunteer.
Stanislaw Lech Kowalski	For service to the community, particularly in the Australian Capital Territory, through organisations supporting multiculturalism and the Lone Fathers Association.
Jack George Kyros†	For service to the Greek community of Western Australia.
Gavin James Larkin†	For service to the community through the advancement and promotion of suicide prevention awareness, and as Founder of R U OK? Day.
Lydia Lassila	For service to sport as a Gold Medallist at the Vancouver 2010 Winter Olympic Games.
Sister Mary Margaret Leahy	For service to pastoral care as the Chaplain of the Stella Maris Apostleship of the Sea.
Jack William Le Cras	For service to the community of Perth, particularly through a range of service organisations, and to the Naval Association of Australia.
Madeleine Mary Le Surf	For service to the community of Manly.
Mikla Katherine Lewis	For service to conservation and the environment in New South Wales.
Dr David Lillystone	For service to medicine in the field of paediatrics and child health.
Mary Lorna Linn	For service to the community of Thebarton, and to local government.
Lieutenant Colonel Glyn David Llanwarne	For service to veterans and their families through the recovery of military insignia.
Norma Maud Lovelace	For service to the community through the Queensland Country Women's Association of Australia.
John Kenneth McCallum	For service to the sport of Rugby League football, Queensland Community Clubs, and to the community of Cairns.
Anne Lynette McDonald	For service to local government, and to the community of the Dungog Shire.
Brian McDonald	For service to the community of Majors Creek.
Caroline Diana McFarlane	For service to the environment, and to the community through the Wentworth Group of Concerned Scientists.
Kerrie June McKenzie	For service to the National Reconciliation Movement between Indigenous and non-Indigenous Australians, through Lane Cove Residents for Reconciliation.
Judith Ann McLean	For service to youth, and to the rural community in Tasmania.
Dr Lindsay Owen McMillan	For service to people with a disability through a range of health organisations and employee assistance programs.
David Grant McSkimming	For service to the performing arts, particularly opera, as a vocal coach and recital pianist.
Ursula MacDermott	For services to the community through the Australian Capital Territory Neighbourhood Watch Association.
David Colin Macfarlane	For service to the performing arts, particularly opera.
John Edmond Mackay	For service to the community of Bankstown through support for fundraising initiatives.
James William Mallice	For service to the community through roles with social welfare organisations.
Trevor Lindsay Manning	For service to the community of Birdwood, and through executive roles with health care providers.
David George Martin	For service to the community, particularly to people with a disability, the aged, and to veterans and their families.
Dr Neil Thomas Matthews	For service to medicine in the field of paediatric critical care as a practitioner and academic.
Lindsay Ross Maybury	For service to the community of Quirindi.
Gus Mercurio†	For service to boxing as an administrator and sports commentator, as a film, television and stage actor, and to the community.
Anthony John Metcalf	For service to youth, to aged welfare, and to motor enthusiast organisations in South Australia.
Patricia Miles†	For service to the community of Eden through aged care, social welfare and service organisations.
Janice Maree Millikan	For service to early childhood education.
Daryl Bruce Mills	For service to the international community through humanitarian roles.
Ashleigh John Moore	For service to community health through Cancer Voices South Australia.
Dr Kerry Leonard Moroney	For service to rural medicine, and to the community of Narrabri.
The Honourable Peter Frederick Morris	For service to the Parliament of Australia through a range of ministerial portfolios, and to the maritime industry and ship safety.
Robert Benjamin Morris	For service to the community through the preservation of the history and heritage of the Lithgow area.
Arthur Neville Moseley	For service to youth through the Scouting movement.
Barry William Moynahan	For service to the sport of rowing in New South Wales.
Timothy John Mulvany	For service to the law, to the protection of children, and to the community.
Edward Maurice Murrell†	For service to the community of the Dungog Shire, to local government, and to emergency service organisations.
Associate Professor Ganapathi Asari Murugesan	For service to medicine, particularly in the field of psychiatry.
Dr Michael Alan Myers	For service to education and to youth through the Re-Engineering Australia Foundation.
Commander Robert Emulis Nelson	For service to education through the development and national delivery of the Science and Engineering Challenge.
Xuan Tiep Nguyen	For service to the Vietnamese community in Australia.
Deborah Ruth Nicholls	For service to the community, particularly as a refugee advocate.
Dr Sally Felstead Nobbs	For service to the international community, particularly of Nepal, as a fundraiser.
Dr Kim Tee Ong	For service to the rural community of Mandurah, and to medicine as a general practitioner.
Michael John O'Sullivan MM	For service to youth, particularly through the Christ Church Grammar School Army Cadet Unit.
Denis Richard Page	For service to business, and to the community of the Australian Capital Territory.
Alan Arthur Parker	For service to the community, particularly through Bicycle Victoria.
Sidney Thomas Parker	For service to the Australian livestock industry, and to horseracing.
Graeme Gordon Patterson	For service to the Australian Football League as an umpire, administrator and historian.
Michael Bernard Pawley	For service to the sport of cricket in the Manly-Dee Why area.
Thomas Payne	For service to the accommodation and hospitality sector, and to the community through a range of arts and charitable organisations.
Tanya Pearson	For service to the performing arts, particularly ballet, as a teacher and mentor to young dancers.
Lynette Pengilly	For service to the community of Parkes.
Emanuel Andrew Petrelis	For service to the Greek community of Western Australia, to business, and to education.
Dorothy Phipps	For service to the community of the Hawkesbury region, and to theatre through the Richmond Players.
The Reverend Lucille Evelyn Piper	For service to the international community through educational, health and pastoral roles.
Robert James Pollock	For service to tourism and to the community of southern New South Wales.
Dr Stuart Barrington Porges	For service to community health in rural and remote areas, and to medicine.
Helen Poulos	For service to children in hospital and to their families.
Peter James Prineas	For service to conservation and the environment in New South Wales through executive and advocacy roles.
Ann Margaret Prunty	For service to international relations through Operation Christmas Child and Samaritan's Purse Australia.
William Benedict Quinlan	For service to the community of Warrnambool through local government and social welfare organisations.
John Malbon Ralston	For service to education through the Independent Schools Council of Australia and the Association of Independent Schools of New South Wales.
Brian Charles Randall	For service to the sport of athletics, and to the community.
Mathiaparanam Ravichandhira	For service to the arts, particularly through the Academy of Indian Music and Cultural Studies Australia.
David Nicholas Rayner	For service to the community through a range of charitable and service organisations.
Dr Geoffrey Arnold Rickarby	For service to medicine, particularly in the field of child and adolescent psychiatry.
Dr John Stanislaus Roarty	For service to medicine, particularly through contributions to St Vincent's Clinic.
Thomas Victor Roberts	For service to the community of Ballarat, particularly through the Royal Australian Air Force Association, and to medicine.
Dr Ian Flett Robertson	For service to ophthalmology, and to the Lions Eye Donation Service.
Anthony Brooke Robins	For service to the community of Adelaide, particularly through the Phoenix Society.
Patricia Frances Roser	For service to the community, and to the Coffs Harbour Garden Club.
Barbara Anne Ryan	For service to the community through the St Vincent de Paul Society.
William Ryan	For service to the community through the United Protestants Association of New South Wales.
Ramon Sandell	For service to the sport of football as an administrator and referee.
Gail Kaye Sanders	For service to the community through the Australian Property Institute.
Peter Schodde†	For service to science education, and to a range of professional associations.
Darren Leslie Scott	For service to the community, particularly through Operation Rosemary.
The Honourable Helen Wai-Har Sham-Ho	For service to the Parliament of New South Wales, to the Chinese Community, and as a supporter of a range of charitable organisations and educational institutions.
Michael Francis Sheils	For service to industrial relations.
Vincent John Shelley	For service to the community of Chiltern.
Maureen Jill Smart	For service to the Indigenous community in South Australia.
Helen Frances Smith	For service to the sport of netball in the Northern Territory.
Lindsay Walter Smith	For service to conservation and the environment, and to the community.
Marion Joyce Smith	For service to youth, particularly through Girl Guides Australia.
Dr Peter Warnock Smith	For service to science education, and to philanthropy.
Samuel George Smith	For service to the community of Gladstone.
Beverley Frances Snell	For service to international health.
Warwick Graeme Soden	For service to judicial administration through the Federal Court of Australia.
Peter Somerville	For service to the commercial passenger boat industry, and to conservation in the Maribyrnong area.
Joan Margaret Sonter	For service to the Port Macquarie branch of the Royal Far West.
Josephine Helen Spaull	For service to the performing arts, particularly dance, as a teacher and administrator.
Christopher Xenephon Stathy	For service to the water industry in South Australia.
Wendy Dianne Stein	For service to the international community through Rotary.
Dr John David Stockard	For service to conservation and the environment, and to the community of the Taree-Manning region.
Alexander Stuart	For service to the building industry, and to the community.
Dr Margaret Catherine Stuart	For service to medical research as a biotechnologist.
Robert John Styling AFSM	For service to people with a disability through advocacy and employment organisations, and to the community.
Marie Rosalie Sullivan	For service to the community, particularly through the Macquarie 2010 Bicentennial Celebrations.
Emeritus Professor John David Sumner-Potts	For service to the media as an academic and educator, and to the community.
Emeritus Professor Roland Denis Sussex	For service to the development and understanding of languages in Australia.
Vicki Sykes	For service to education through the Mater Hospital Special School, and to youth.
Graham John Symes	For service to the community through the Traffic Offenders Program.
Noel Edward Tarbotton	For service to youth through Scouts Australia.
Jill Mary Taylor	For service to wildlife conservation through the Hunter Koala Preservation Society.
Carol Michelle Tebbutt	For service to Australia-Fiji relations.
Sheila Hamilton Thompson	For service to the community of Canberra as a church organist and musical director.
Associate Professor Peter Frederick Thursby	For service to medicine in the field of vascular surgery, and to the Concord Repatriation General Hospital.
Dr John William Tierney	For service to the Parliament of Australia, to education, and to the community.
Julie Anne Tongs	For service to the Indigenous community of the Australian Capital Territory.
Geraldine Mavis Treloar	For service to the podiatry profession.
Kevin Richard Trent RFD	For service to local government, and to the community of South Perth through a range of ex-service and social welfare organisations.
Professor Rodney Stuart Tucker	For service to the electrical and electronics industry, particularly as an academic and educator.
Barbara Elizabeth Valentine	For service to the community through the preservation of the history of Launceston, and to the museum and galleries sector.
Sabina van der Linden-Wolanski†	For service to the community through a range of Jewish organisations.
Claire Russell Vickery	For service to the community through the Butterfly Foundation.
Barbara Gay von Ess	For service to people with autism spectrum disorders and their families, as an advocate and educator.
Shane Patrick Wall	For service to primary industry, and to the community of the Wimmera region.
Frances Dawn Wallace	For service to the community of Quirindi.
Geraldine Walters	For service to people with a disability through administrative and fundraising roles.
Phyllis Ware	For service to Friends of the Royal Perth Hospital.
Jessica Rose Watson	For service to sailing and to youth through the achievement of sailing solo and unassisted around the world, and as a role model for young Australians.
Michael Victor Webster	For service to the horseracing industry, and to the community.
Jillianne Elizabeth Weekes	For service to the Starlight Children's Foundation Australia.
Anna Wellings Booth	For service to women's health through a range of breast cancer support organisations, particularly Dragons Abreast Australian Capital Territory and Region and Breast Cancer Network Australia.
Sylvia Frances Westerman	For service to the community, particularly through the Quilts for Keeps project.
Dr Rodney Neil Westhorpe	For service to medicine as an anaesthetist.
Ildikó Wetherell	For service to the Hungarian community in South Australia.
Dr Brian Peter Wheatley	For service to medicine in the field of obstetrics and gynaecology, and to medical education.
Oscar Ralph Whitbread	For service to the Australian film and television industry.
Doreen Widdison	For service to the community of Albury, particularly through Woodstock Support.
Commander John Murray Wilkins RFD	For service to the preservation of Australia's naval history.
David Bosworick Williams	For service to music education as a teacher, and to the performing arts.
Dr Pamela Kaye Williams	For service to women's health through executive roles with breast cancer awareness organisations.
Karen Lee Willis	For service to the protection of women and children.
Robert Willis	For service to the preservation of Australian folklore and traditional music.
Raymond Percy Wilson	For service to the sport of golf, and to the community through a range of charitable organisations.
August Wohlschlager	For service to the community of Port Pirie.
Victor George Wood	For service to arts and crafts in Australia as an artisan and through the Victorian Woodworkers Association.
June Gloria Woolard	For service to the Penrith Community Kitchen.
Dr Leslie Arthur Woollard	For service to medicine in rural and remote areas of New South Wales.
Ruth Elizabeth Wraith	For service to community health, particularly the treatment of children recovering from trauma.
Ronald Wright	For service to the sport of cricket in New South Wales.
Dr Jeffrey Alfred Wunderlich	For service to the community of Boroondara, particularly Hawthorn, through a range of volunteer roles in community support, education, sport and recreation.
Robin Michael Youl RFD	For service to conservation and the environment in Victoria through the Landcare movement.
Julia Helen Young	For service to the community of the North Coast as a supporter of mental health service delivery.
Hayden Paul Zammit	For service to the community of Broken Hill through a range of fundraising and volunteer programs, and to youth leadership.
Faddy Zouky	For service to business, and to the multicultural community in Victoria.

==== Military Division ====
Branch	Recipient	Citation
Navy	Warrant Officer Sharon Eileen Campbell	For meritorious service in the field of Leadership and Recruit training in the Royal Australian Navy.
Army	Warrant Officer Class One A—	For meritorious service to the Australian Army.
Army	Warrant Officer Class One Paul Charles Beadle	For meritorious performance of duty as the Warrant Officer Supply, Deployable Logistic Information Systems Support Team from 2007 to 2010.
Army	Warrant Officer Class One Stephen Andrew Colman	For meritorious service as the Regimental Sergeant Major of 12th/40th Battalion, the Royal Tasmania Regiment and 6th Battalion, the Royal Australian Regiment.
Army	Warrant Officer Class One Brent Alexander Doyle	For meritorious service as the Regimental Sergeant Major of 4th Combat Engineer Regiment and 3rd Combat Engineer Regiment.
Army	Warrant Officer Class Two Craig Stuart Duncan	For meritorious performance of duty, including as the Company Sergeant Major, 4th Brigade Reserve Response Force, in Defence aid to the community of Victoria during fires and floods from 2009 to 2011.
Army	Warrant Officer Class One John James Miller	For meritorious service to the introduction into the Australian Army of the Abrams Main Battle Tank and as the Regimental Artificer Sergeant Major of the 1st Armoured Regiment.
Army	Warrant Officer Class One Darren James Murch	For meritorious service as the Regimental Sergeant Major of 8th/7th Battalion, the Royal Victoria Regiment, 1st Battalion, the Royal Australian Regiment and the Mentoring and Reconstruction Task Force Two.
Air Force	Wing Commander Geoffrey Bowen Kimmins CSC	For meritorious service in the Directorate of Flying Safety, Maintenance Management and Planning Implementation, and the School of Technical Training.

== Meritorious Service ==
=== Public Service Medal (PSM) ===
Public Service Medal ribbon

Branch	Recipient	Citation
Aust.	Martin Gerard Bowles	For outstanding public service in delivering highly successful energy efficiency policies and remediation programs for the Home Insulation and Green Loans programs.
Aust.	Blair Robert Comley	For outstanding public service in the development of public policy, particularly in the areas of carbon pricing and emissions trading, tax policy design and debt management.
Aust.	Gregory Dark	For outstanding public service in continuity to tax administration, particularly in the areas of major project implementation and innovative service delivery.
Aust.	Janet Florence Dorrington	For outstanding public service through management of Australian border security as National Director, Passengers Division, Australian Customs and Border Protection Service.
Aust.	Gregory Douglas Farr	For outstanding public service in leading major reforms to the strategy and delivery of information and Communication Technology Systems, particularly in the Department of Defence.
Aust.	Alistair Legge	For outstanding public service in enhancing Australia's support for electoral processes in neighbouring countries and for the successful establishment of the Indigenous Electoral Participation Program.
Aust.	Gary Wayne Maroske	For outstanding public service in establishing and maintaining effective biosecurity measures in the Torres Strait and Northern Peninsula areas.
Aust.	James John Marshall	For outstanding public service in the management and delivery of Australia's mail-sorting and delivery network.
Aust.	Neil Richard Orme	For outstanding public service in the fields of Defence policy development, corporate renewal and strategic issues management.
Aust.	Ronald Thompson Perry	For outstanding public service in the development and maintenance of the Council of Australian Governments as an effective institution of Australian governments.
Aust.	Leslie May Riggs	For outstanding public service in playing critical roles in driving national transport reform.
Aust.	Dr Michelle Claire Storey	For outstanding public service in establishing the Murchison Radioastronomy OBservatory and for assisting Australia's bid to host the international Square Kilometre Array project.
Aust.	Thomas Fiaschi Yates	For outstanding public service in organising the evacuation of Australian citizens from Tripoli, Libya, in February 2011.
NSW	Michael Richard Allen	For outstanding public service to the improvement of social housing in New South Wales.
NSW	John Leonard Burke	For outstanding public service in the development of the Government Records Repository in New South Wales.
NSW	Patricia Anne Darlington	For outstanding public service to the enhancement of public awareness of the environment.
NSW	Annette Dale Gallard	For outstanding public service to the achievement of social justice for disadvantaged people in New South Wales.
NSW	Daniel Joseph Graham	For outstanding public service in pioneering the development and delivery of public infrastructure in New South Wales through Public Private Partnerships and Privately Financed Partnerships.
NSW	Timothy Charles Hager	For outstanding public service in the area of environmental conservation in New South Wales.
NSW	Terrence Ernest Kiss	For outstanding public service in the community of the Coolamon Shire.
NSW	Dr Klaus Koop	For outstanding public service in the area of marine estuarine ecology and biogeochemistry.
NSW	Christopher Kenneth Ryan	For outstanding public service to public education and training in New South Wales.
NSW	Clarence John Slockee	For outstanding public service to the Royal Botanic Gardens and Domain Trust.
NSW	Robert Michael Williams	For outstanding public service to water management in New South Wales.
Vic.	Yehudi Blacher	For outstanding public service in the instigation, promotion and implementation of innovative reforms in public administration.
Vic.	Mary Yin Chan	For outstanding public service as a leader among Supported Residential Services in Victoria, willing to work on pilot projects and continually endeavouring to improve services and living standards for the elderly.
Vic.	Susan Leigh Williams	For outstanding public service to tsunami reconstruction in Sri Lanka and the Maldives.
Qld	Philip Adrian Berting	For outstanding public service to local government in Queensland.
Qld	Dr Geoffrey James Dickie	For outstanding public service in Queensland's economic growth while ensuring responsible development and sustainability.
Qld	Robyn Gail Eltherington	For outstanding public service to Forgotten Australians – former residents of Queensland institutions.
Qld	Leslie Naureen Shirreffs	For outstanding public service to environmental conservation and management in Queensland.
Qld	Dr David Craig Sowden	For outstanding public service in Queensland Health, particularly in the areas of infectious diseases and clinical education.
Qld	Peter Thomas Trim	For outstanding public service to the development and delivery of road and transport infrastructure in Queensland.
WA	Peter John Mitchell	For outstanding public service, particularly as the Sheriff of Western Australia.
WA	Dr Shayne Silcox	For outstanding public service, particularly to local government in Western Australia.
SA	Dr Terence George Donald	For outstanding public service in the area of child protection services.
SA	Margot Jean Foster	For outstanding public service in the area of education.
SA	Andrew William Johnson	For outstanding public service in the area of environmental and natural resource management.
ACT	Anthony Seamus Gill	For outstanding public service to road safety within the Australian Capital Territory.
NT	Brendan Joseph Lawson	For outstanding public service to the Northern Territory, particularly in the successful management of major infrastructure projects.

=== Australian Police Medal (APM) ===
Australian Police Medal ribbon

Branch	Recipient
Australian Federal Police	Assistant Commissioner Ramzi Jabbour
Australian Federal Police	Superintendent Christopher John Lines
New South Wales Police	Assistant Commissioner Peter Barrie
New South Wales Police	Sergeant Paul George Batista
New South Wales Police	Senior Sergeant Ronald Charles Dorrough
New South Wales Police	Detective Chief Superintendent Wayne Desmond Gordon
New South Wales Police	Detective Inspector Paul Yervan Jacob
New South Wales Police	Inspector Mark Anthony Minehan
New South Wales Police	Detective Superintendent Peter James O'Brien
New South Wales Police	Detective Chief Inspector Brad Edmund Tayler
New South Wales Police	Detective Inspector Peter Yeomans
Victoria Police	Superintendent John Joseph Blayney
Victoria Police	Assistant Commissioner Andrew Stuart Crisp
Victoria Police	Senior Sergeant Steven Gordon Deveson
Victoria Police	Senior Sergeant Gaetano Joe Ilardi
Victoria Police	Superintendent Geoffery Allan Newby
Victoria Police	Inspector Stephen James Waddell
Queensland Police	Senior Sergeant Peter Raymond Flexman
Queensland Police	Inspector John Fox
Queensland Police	Senior Sergeant Kevin Thomas Gleeson
Queensland Police	Detective Superintendent Daniel Christopher Mahon
Queensland Police	Detective Senior Sergeant Karyn Melinda Murphy
Queensland Police	Chief Superintendent Raymond George Pringle
Western Australia Police	Assistant Commissioner Duane Garnet Bell
Western Australia Police	Senior Sergeant Mark Roger Davey
Western Australia Police	Superintendent Kevin Charles Looby
South Australia Police	Superintendent Kym Stephen Hardwick
South Australia Police	Assistant Commissioner Grantley John Stephens
South Australia Police	Detective Sergeant Brian Ian Swan
Tasmania Police	Inspector Anthony Paul Cerritelli
Tasmania Police	Commander Mark Mewis
Northern Territory Police	Assistant Commissioner Mark Leonard Payne
Northern Territory Police	Senior Sergeant Andrew Peter Pusterla

=== Australian Fire Service Medal (AFSM) ===
Australian Fire Service Medal ribbon

Branch	Recipient
New South Wales Fire Services	Jeffrey James Bower
New South Wales Fire Services	Anthony Michael Camilleri
New South Wales Fire Services	Russell Geoffrey Deaves
New South Wales Fire Services	Paul Jack Gleeson
New South Wales Fire Services	Peter Murgatroyd
New South Wales Fire Services	Christopher John Powell
New South Wales Fire Services	Mervyn John Reed
New South Wales Fire Services	Geoffrey Claude Towner
New South Wales Fire Services	Bruce Ronald Walton
Victoria Fire Services	Robert Wayne Jarvis
Victoria Fire Services	Neil Stanley Labbett
Victoria Fire Services	Trevor Robert Mills
Victoria Fire Services	Allan James Morton
Victoria Fire Services	Alan Norman Rhodes
Victoria Fire Services	Leslie John Vearing
Victoria Fire Services	Bruce Leonard Vine
Queensland Fire Services	Ian William Birbeck
Queensland Fire Services	Brian Francis Clerk
Queensland Fire Services	Antonio Perna
Queensland Fire Services	Charles Isaac Smith†
Queensland Fire Services	John Stanley Watson
Western Australia Fire Services	Russell Joseph Hayes
Western Australia Fire Services	Marion Kaye MacDougall
Western Australia Fire Services	Roderick Malcolm MacDougall
Western Australia Fire Services	Jeffry John Smith
South Australia Fire Services	Terence John Beeston
South Australia Fire Services	Barry Elliott Luke
South Australia Fire Services	Suzanne Joy Mickan
South Australia Fire Services	Colin Anthony Ryles
Tasmania Fire Service	Anthony Dick Blanks
Tasmania Fire Service	Colin Edwin Triffitt

=== Ambulance Service Medal (ASM) ===
Ambulance Service Medal ribbon

Branch	Recipient
New South Wales Ambulance Service	Dr Ronald John Manning
New South Wales Ambulance Service	Maureen Ann Roberts
Victoria Ambulance Service	Dr Andrew Kenneth Bacon
Victoria Ambulance Service	Bryan Charles Cass
Victoria Ambulance Service	Stephen John Humphreys
Victoria Ambulance Service	Ian Robert Jarvie
Victoria Ambulance Service	Daniel James McGennisken
Victoria Ambulance Service	Mark Edward Rogers
Queensland Ambulance Service	Michelle Susan Baxter
Queensland Ambulance Service	Deidree Whap
Western Australia Ambulance Service	Christopher Joseph Gleisinger
Western Australia Ambulance Service	Julian John Smith
Western Australia Ambulance Service	Pamela Joy Tennant
South Australia Ambulance Service	Malcolm Latimer Hancock
South Australia Ambulance Service	David John Tingey
Tasmania Ambulance Service	Desmond Reginald Lane
Northern Territory Ambulance Service	Michael James McKay

=== Emergency Services Medal (ESM) ===
Emergency Services Medal ribbon

Branch	Recipient
New South Wales Emergency Services	Mark David Darling
New South Wales Emergency Services	Rolf Leonard Garda
New South Wales Emergency Services	Trevor Gordon Milgate OAM
Victoria Emergency Services	Peter Thomas Kueffer
Victoria Emergency Services	Gary John Lovell
Victoria Emergency Services	Michael John Matthews
Queensland Emergency Services	Peter Andrew Gould
Queensland Emergency Services	Carrollyn Anne Hennessy
Western Australia Emergency Services	David Emmanuel Clark
Western Australia Emergency Services	Leslie Alexander Hayter
Western Australia Emergency Services	William John Norris
South Australia Emergency Services	Lynette Joy Berghofer
South Australia Emergency Services	Donald Wayne Rose
Tasmania Emergency Services	Gregory Donald French
Tasmania Emergency Services	Andrew James Lea
Tasmania Emergency Services	Ian Andrew Nielsen OAM
Northern Territory Emergency Services	Gary Douglas Carrington

== Gallantry, Distinguished and Conspicuous Service ==
=== Medal for Gallantry (MG) ===
Medal for Gallantry ribbon

Branch	Recipient	Citation
Army	Sergeant D—	For acts of gallantry in action in hazardous circumstances.
Army	Private K—	For acts of gallantry in action in hazardous circumstances.
Army	Private Paul Bjorn Langer	For acts of gallantry in action in hazardous circumstances on 24 August 2010 while a rifleman with Mentoring Team Delta, the 1st Mentoring Task Force at Derapet, Tangi Valley, Afghanistan.
Army	Sergeant Sean Anthony Lanigan	For acts of gallantry in action in hazardous circumstances on 24 August 2010 while a platoon sergeant and mentor with Mentoring Team Delta, the 1st Mentoring Task Force at Derapet, Tangi Valley, Afghanistan.

=== Commendation for Gallantry ===
Commendation for Gallantry ribbon

Branch	Recipient	Citation
Army	Private A—	For acts of gallantry in action.
Army	Corporal C—	For acts of gallantry in action while a team commander.
Army	Corporal D—	For acts of gallantry in action while a team commander.
Army	Corporal Adam John Heemskerk	For acts of gallantry in action on 20 August 2010 while a section commander with Mentoring Team Alpha, the 1st Mentoring Task Force at Musazai, Mirabad Valley, Afghanistan.
Army	Lance Corporal Shaun Miller Kober	For acts of gallantry in action during October 2010 and January 2011 while a sniper team second-in-command in Mentoring Team Four Three Bravo, Combat Team Delta, the 2nd Mentoring Task Force in Chora, Baluchi Valley, Afghanistan.
Army	Private Shaun Patrick Parker	For acts of gallantry in action on 24 August 2010 while a machine gunner with Mentoring Team Delta, the 1st Mentoring Task Force at Derapet, Tangi Valley, Afghanistan.
Army	Private S—	For acts of gallantry in action.

=== Bar to the Distinguished Service Cross ===
Branch	Recipient	Citation
Army	Lieutenant-Colonel P— DSC	For distinguished command and leadership in action.

=== Distinguished Service Cross (DSC) ===
Distinguished Service Cross ribbon

Branch	Recipient	Citation
Army	Colonel Jason Peter Blain CSC	For distinguished command and leadership in action as the Commanding Officer, the 1st Mentoring Task Force, and Deputy Commander, Combined Team Uruzgan, on Operation SLIPPER in Afghanistan from January to October 2010.
Army	Lieutenant Colonel C—	For distinguished command and leadership in action.
Army	Major General John Patrick Cantwell AO	For distinguished command and leadership in action as the Commander Joint Task Force 633 on Operations SLIPPER and KRUGER.
Army	Lieutenant Colonel Mark Raymond Jennings	For distinguished command and leadership in action as the Commander Officer, the 1st Mentoring Task Force on Operation SLIPPER in Afghanistan from May to October 2010.

=== Bar to the Distinguished Service Medal ===
Distinguished Service Medal and Bar ribbon

Branch	Recipient	Citation
Army	Major P— DSM	For distinguished leadership in action.

=== Distinguished Service Medal (DSM) ===
Distinguished Service Medal ribbon

Branch	Recipient	Citation
Navy	Lieutenant Richard Eric Brickacek	For distinguished leadership in action on 20 and 21 August 2010 while leader of an explosive ordnance team in Kipto and in Shah Zafar in Afghanistan on Operation Slipper.
Army	Major B—	For distinguished leadership in action.
Army	Lieutenant James Peter Fanning	For distinguished leadership in action on 24 August 2010 while a platoon commander and a lead mentor with Mentoring Team Delta, the 1st Mentoring Task Force at Derapet, Tangi Valley, Afghanistan.
Army	Major G—	For distinguished leadership in action in warlike operations.
Army	Major R—	For distinguished leadership in action.
Army	Warrant Officer Class Two T—	For distinguished leadership in action.
Army	Sergeant Brett Mathew Wood MG†	For distinguished leadership in action while deployed with Special Operations Task Group Rotation XV on Operation Slipper in Afghanistan.

=== Commendation for Distinguished Service ===
Commendation for Distinguished Service ribbon

Branch	Recipient	Citation
Navy	Commodore Roger Livingston Boyce	For distinguished performance of duty in warlike operations as Deputy Commander Joint Task Force 633 on Operation Slipper in the Middle East Area of Operations from April to October 2010.
Navy	Rear Admiral David Lance Johnston	For distinguished performance of duty in warlike operations as Deputy Commander Joint Task Force 633 on Operations Slipper and Kruger from October 2010 to March 2011.
Army	Major A—	For distinguished performance of duty in warlike operations.
Army	Trooper A—	For distinguished performance of duty in warlike operations and in action.
Army	Sergeant A—	For distinguished performance of duty in warlike operations and in action.
Army	Captain C—	For distinguished performance of duty in warlike operations and in action.
Army	Sergeant K—	For distinguished performance of duty in warlike operations and in action.
Army	Sergeant M—	For distinguished performance of duty in warlike operations and in action.
Army	Corporal P—	For distinguished performance of duty in warlike operations.
Army	Brigadier Simon Roach AM	For distinguished performance of duty in warlike operations as Assistant Commander Joint Task Force 633 on Operation Slipper in the Middle East Area of Operations from April 2010 to February 2011.
Army	Private Brenden Leigh Robins	For distinguished performance of duty in warlike operations and in action while a combat medic with the 2nd Mentoring Task Force on Operation Slipper in Chora, Baluchi Valley, Afghanistan from October 2010 to February 2011.
Army	Colonel Nicholas David Rowntree	For distinguished performance of duty in warlike operations as Senior Military Adviser to the Special Representative of the Secretary General of the United Nations Assistance Mission for Iraq on Operation Riverbank.
Army	Sergeant S—	For distinguished performance of duty in warlike operations and in action.
Army	Major Richard Shannon Simson	For distinguished performance of duty in warlike operations as Staff Officer Grade Two – Afghan National Army Development, Headquarters Regional Command (South) on Operation Slipper in Afghanistan from April to November 2010.
Army	Lieutenant Colonel Richard Anthony Vagg	For distinguished performance of duty in warlike operations as the Commanding Officer, Artillery Training Team Kabul on Operation Slipper in Afghanistan from April to November 2010.
Air Force	Wing Commander Martin John Smith	For distinguished performance of duty in warlike operations as the inaugural Commanding Officer, Multi-National Base Command Tarin Kowt, on Operation Slipper in Afghanistan from June 2010 to January 2011.

=== Conspicuous Service Cross (CSC) ===
Conspicuous Service Cross ribbon

Branch	Recipient	Citation
Navy	Commander Alan William Regan RFD	For outstanding achievement as the Staff Officer Grade One Rapid Environmental Assessment, Joint Environment Centre, Headquarters Joint Operations Command.
Army	Colonel Brian James Bailey	For outstanding achievement as Colonel Joint Fires at Headquarters 6th Brigade Australia.
Army	Colonel Michael David Bond	For outstanding achievement as the Commanding Officer of 9th Battalion, the Royal Queensland Regiment.
Army	Colonel Andrew William Constantine	For outstanding achievement in the field of Joint Military Logistics.
Army	Lieutenant Colonel Craig David Dobson	For outstanding achievement as the Commanding Officer of the 10th Force Support Battalion.
Army	Lieutenant Colonel Natasha Anne Fox	For outstanding achievement as Chief Instructor of the Australian Defence Force Academy.
Army	Colonel Timothy Fidock Gellel	For outstanding achievement as Australia's Defence Attaché to Japan.
Army	Major Keirin John Joyce	For outstanding achievement as the Staff Officer Grade Two Tactical Unmanned Aerial Vehicle Capability Implementation Team, Army Headquarters.
Army	Lieutenant Colonel Nathan Edward Juchniewicz DSC	For outstanding achievement as the Staff Officer Grade Two – Combat Development, Army Headquarters.
Army	Brigadier Paul David McLachlan	For outstanding achievement as the Commander Joint Task Force 637 on Operation Queensland Flood Assist in January and February 2011.
Army	Lieutenant Colonel Alan Martin Mellier	For outstanding achievement as the Chief Engineer of the Soldier Modernisation Systems Program Office.
Army	Warrant Officer Class Two Neil George Patrick	For outstanding achievement as the Training Warrant Officer of the Army Explosive Hazards Centre and 20th Explosive Ordnance Disposal Squadron.
Air Force	Flight Sergeant Russell Leonard Beck	For outstanding achievement as the Number 81 Wing Maintenance Coordinator in support of Hornet Fleet Planning.
Air Force	Sergeant Brendan John Church	For outstanding achievement as the C-130 Propulsion System Engineering Specialist at Air Lift Systems Program Office.
Air Force	Wing Commander Darren James Goldie	For outstanding achievement as Staff Officer Very Important Person Operations.
Air Force	Group Captain Matthew George Hegarty	For outstanding achievement as the Commanding Officer of Number 37 Squadron.
Air Force	Squadron Leader Stephen Robert Hoadley	For outstanding achievement as Senior Engineering Officer of Number 1 Squadron.
Air Force	Squadron Leader Steven Charles Parsons	For outstanding achievement as Commander Air Component Coordination Element, Joint Task Force 639.

=== Conspicuous Service Medal (CSM) ===
Conspicuous Service Medal ribbon

Branch	Recipient	Citation
Navy	Chief Petty Officer Dennis Bentley	For meritorious devotion to duty as the Operations Manager, Royal Australian Navy Relief Trust Fund.
Navy	Commander Darren Greville Grogan	For meritorious achievement in the field of Border Protection at Headquarters Northern Command and at the Royal Australian Navy Patrol Boat Group.
Navy	Lieutenant Commander Michael Leslie Jacobson	For meritorious devotion to duty as the Executive Officer of Submarine Crew Two in HMAS Collins.
Navy	Chief Petty Officer Andrew William Maskell	For meritorious devotion to duty as the Personnel Officer aboard HMAS Manoora and for services to the wider naval community.
Navy	Commander Paul James O'Grady	For meritorious achievement as Commanding Officer of the Royal Australian Navy Recruit School.
Army	Warrant Officer Class One Brian James Buskell	For meritorious achievement as the Regimental Sergeant Major, Combined Task Force 635 on Operation Anode in the Solomon Islands in 2010.
Army	Captain D—	For meritorious achievement in logistic support and management.
Army	Major Ian Thomas Dodd	For meritorious achievement as the Staff Officer Grade Three, Facilities at Headquarters 17th Combat Service Support Brigade.
Army	Major Daniel Scott Farrands	For meritorious achievement as Second-in-Command of the North West Mobile Force and Joint Task Force 641, Operation Outreach.
Army	Warrant Officer Class One Andrew Charles Grubb	For meritorious achievement in the field of soldier career management.
Army	Warrant Officer Class One Ian Douglas Hancock	For meritorious devotion to duty in support of the Army Aboriginal Community Assistance Program and the Defence Co-operation Program.
Army	Warrant Officer Class One Christopher Raymond Hodder	For meritorious achievement as Defence Administrative Assistant, Defence Section, Australian Embassy Riyadh, Saudi Arabia.
Army	Major Jason Timothy Kerr	For meritorious devotion to duty as the Project Officer with the Australian Fromelles Project Group.
Army	Warrant Officer Class Two Joanne Maria Novak	For meritorious devotion to duty in the field of logistic training development and employment category management.
Air Force	Squadron Leader Daryl Allan Bossert	For meritorious achievement as a personnel manager in the Directorate of Personnel – Air Force.
Air Force	Flight Sergeant Mathew James Butler	For meritorious achievement as the Senior Non-Commissioned Officer Targets at Number 82 Tactical Intelligence Flight, Number 87 Squadron.
Air Force	Wing Commander Stewart Clay Freeman OAM	For meritorious achievement as the Deputy Director Business Management and Development, Directorate of Supply Chain Support within the Joint Logistics Command.
Air Force	Squadron Leader Lara Jayne Gunn	For meritorious achievement as the Health Logistics Staff Officer at Headquarters Health Services Wing.
Air Force	Warrant Officer Trevor Allen Scholl	For meritorious devotion to duty as the Warrant Officer Engineer, Joint Task Force 639 Air Component Coordination Element.
Air Force	Squadron Leader Jason Gregory Taylor	For meritorious achievement as the Officer-in-Charge of Logistics Support Flight and Executive Officer at Number 322 Expeditionary Combat Support Squadron.
Air Force	Squadron Leader Wendy Anne Walker	For meritorious achievement as the Principal Staff Officer Logistics and the Service Delivery Manager on Operation Astute in East Timor from August 2010 to April 2011.
Air Force	Flight Sergeant Gavin Keith Willmett	For meritorious achievement as the Air Operations Clerk, Australian Defence Staff Papua New Guinea.
