= Faraone =

Faraone is a surname. Notable people with the surname include:

- Chris Faraone, American journalist and author
- Davide Faraone (born 1975), Italian politician
- Lorenzo Faraone, Australian electrical and electronic engineer, professor at the University of Western Australia
- Roberto Faraone Mennella (1971–2020), Italian-born American jeweller
- Stephen Faraone (born 1956), American psychologist, professor and author

== See also ==
- Faraones, a name used for the Mescalero, an Apache tribe of Native Americans
