= Andrew Brice =

Andrew Brice may refer to:

- Andrew Brice (writer) (1690–1773), English printer and writer
- Andrew Brice (businessman) (fl. 1960s–2010s), Australian businessman and philanthropist
