= Jeffrey Lee (disambiguation) =

Jeffrey Lee may also refer to:

- Jeffrey Lee, Aboriginal Australian man of the Djok clan
- Jeffrey Lee (bishop), American Episcopal bishop
- Jeffrey James Lee, more commonly spelt as Jeffery Lee, American convicted murderer
