= Thomas Baxter (rugby union) =

- Born: 28 April 1935 Brisbane, Australia
- Died: 4 August 2019 (aged 84)
- School: Brisbane Grammar School
- University: University of Queensland; Oxford University
- Occupation: Engineer

Rugby union career
- Position: Utility back
International career
Years	Team	Apps	(Points)
1958	Australia	1	(0)

Thomas Baxter OAM (28 April 1935 — 4 August 2019) was an Australian engineer and rugby union international.

A native of Brisbane, Baxter attended Brisbane Grammar School and the University of Queensland.

Baxter, a utility back, played for the University of Queensland Rugby Club and was a Queensland state representative.

In 1958, Baxter gained a Wallabies call up for the tour of New Zealand, which included a three Test series against the All Blacks. After missing selection for the first two Tests, he was a last minute replacement for the injured Danny Kay to line up at outside centre for the 3rd Test at Alexandra Park, Auckland, attaining his solitary Wallabies cap.

Having been awarded a Rhodes Scholarship, Baxter left Australia in 1958 to study at Oxford University. He twice received rugby blues and played some rugby with London club Blackheath.

A noted engineer, Baxter helped develop the Port of Brisbane strategic plan, going on to serve on the board between 1996 and 1999. He was also President of the Queensland Division Committee of Engineers Australia in the 1990s.

Baxter was honoured with the Medal of the Order of Australia (OAM) in the 2012 Australia Day list for "service to engineering through executive roles, and to the community".

== See also ==
- List of Australia national rugby union players
