= Andrew Brice (writer) =

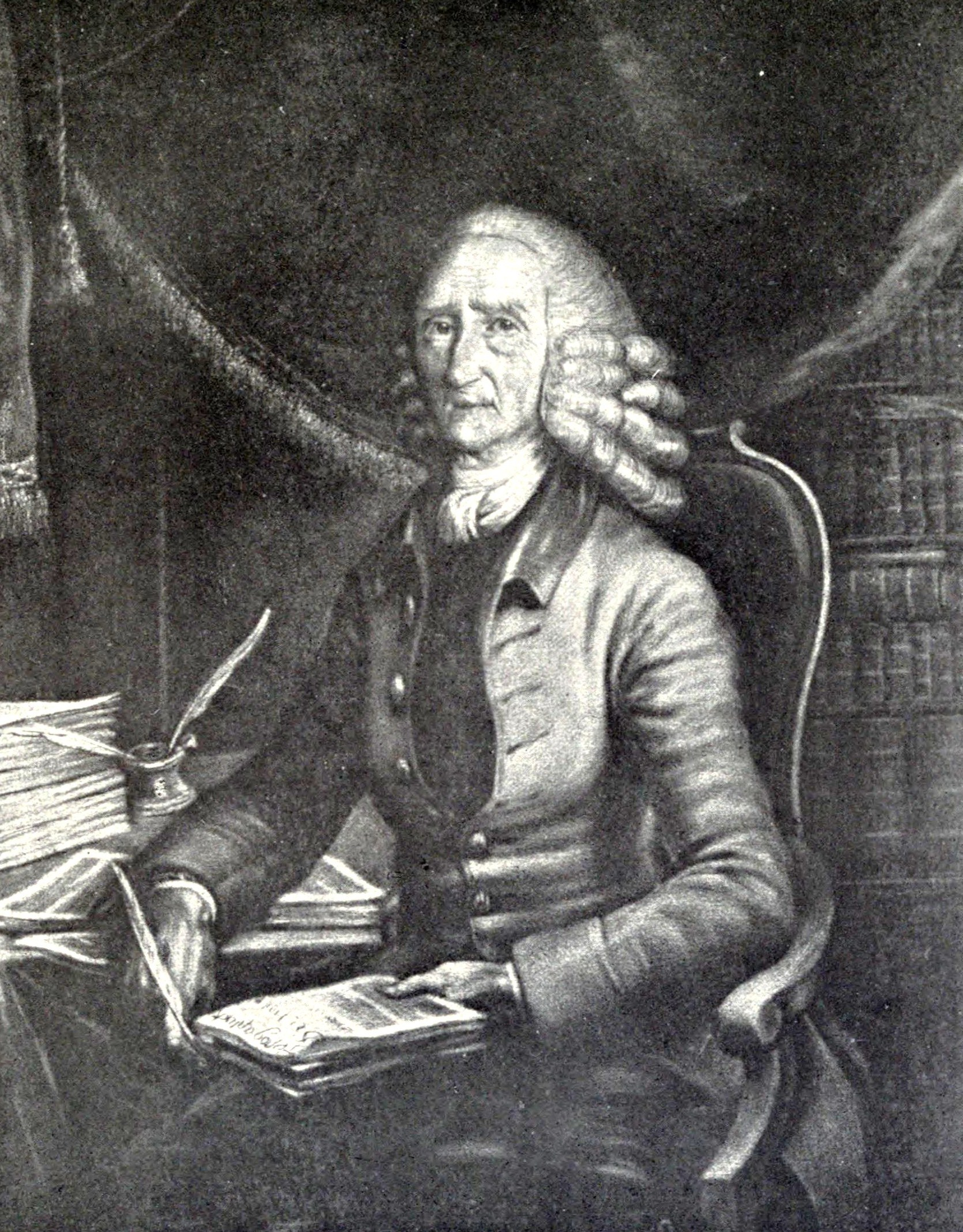
Andrew Brice, from "Devonshire Characters and Strange Events" by Sabine Baring-Gould

Andrew Brice (1690–1773) was an English printer and writer.

== Life ==
=== Early career ===
Brice was the son of Andrew Brice, a shoemaker, was born at Exeter in 1690, and was intended by his friends to be trained as a dissenting minister, but when he was seventeen years old their want of resources forced him to think of another pursuit. He became a printer, apprenticing himself for five years to a tradesman in his native city by the name of Bliss. Long before the term of service expired he married, and as he found himself in a year or two unable to support his family he enlisted, with the object of cancelling his indentures. His friends soon obtained his discharge, and helped him to commence business on his own account in 1714, though with such slender materials that he had but one size of type for all his work, including the printing of a weekly newspaper.

=== Debts and the leisure to write ===
About 1722 the debtors in the city and county prisons induced him to lay their grievances before the public, with the result that he found himself entangled in a lawsuit and cast in damages which he could not discharge. For seven years he remained under restraint, and was consequently supplied with sufficient leisure for the composition of an heroic-comic poem in six cantos, entitled Freedom, a poem written in time of recess from the rapacious claws of bailiffs and devouring fangs of gaolers, by Andrew Brice, printer. To which is annexed the author's case, (1730), the profits arising from which were sufficient to secure his release. Soon after he published a collection of stories and poems with the title of Agreeable Gallimaufry, or Matchless Medley. In about 1740 Brice set up a printing business at Truro in addition to that at Exeter, but soon closed it. His disposition was mirthful, and he was a great patron of the stage. In 1745, when the players were being persecuted at Exeter, he published a poem defending their conduct and attacking the Methodists, to which he gave the name of The Play-house Church, or New Actors of Devotion.

=== Later career and death ===
His dramatic tastes and his charitable feelings constantly involved him in pecuniary difficulties and obliged him to prosecute his trade until he was the oldest master printer in England. By this time he was left without wife or children, and he parted with his business for a weekly annuity and retired to a country house near Exeter. He died on 7 November 1773, and his body lay in state in an inn at Exeter, every person who came to see it paying a shilling to defray the cost of the funeral. As Brice was the oldest freemason in England, three hundred members of that body escorted his coffin to the grave in Bartholomew churchyard on 14 November. His books were sold in the following year.

== Major writings ==
Brice's weekly newspaper lasted from about 1715 until his death. In the number for 2 June 1727 appeared the first part of the familiar dialect-dialogue of The Exmoor Scolding, and the second part was printed in the issue for 25 August 1727. This piece has often been printed with the addition of An Exmoor Courtship. These works are generally attributed to a "Peter Lock" of North-Moulton, but Brice finished the Courtship and edited the first and several other editions. James Davidson in his Bibliotheca Devoniensis assigns to Brice the authorship of the ironical A Short Essay on the Scheme lately set on foot for lighting and keeping clean the Streets of the City of Exeter, demonstrating its pernicious and fatal effects (1755). In 1738 he wrote the Mobiad, or Battle of the Voice, an heroi-comic poem, being a description of an Exeter election but it was not printed until 1770, when he styled himself on the title-page "Democritus Juvenal, Moral Professor of Ridicule, and Plaguy Pleasant Professor of Stingtickle College, vulgarly Andrew Brice, Exon."

Brice's major work, begun in 1746 and finished in 1757, was the Grand Gazetteer, or Topographic Dictionary, published in 1759. Among volumes from his press were the History of Cornwall, by William Hals, and John Vowell's Account of the City of Exeter.
