= Perowne Barracks =

British military installation in Hong Kong

- Hong Kong
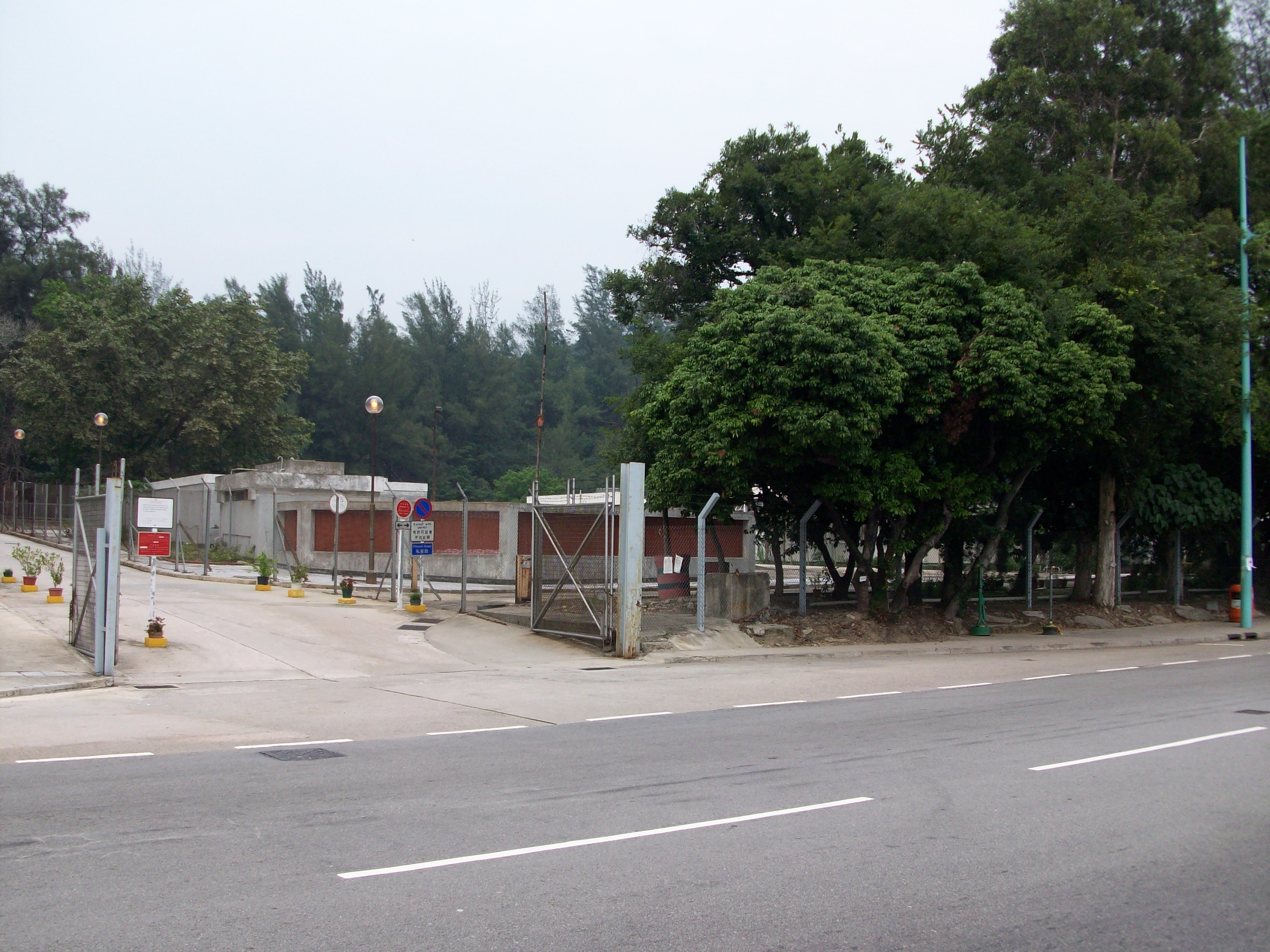
- Perowne Barracks Entrance

Site information
- Type: Barracks
- Owner: Ministry of Defence
- Operator: British Army

Location
- Location within Hong Kong
- Coordinates: 22.374151°N 113.992252°E

Site history
- Built: 1931; 95 years ago
- Built for: War Office
- In use: 1931-1994

Garrison information
- Occupants: Brigade of Gurkhas

Perowne Barracks is a former British Army barracks in Hong Kong. The barracks are no longer in military use.

== History ==
The barracks, which were established as Tai Lam Military Camp in 1931, were subsequently renamed Perowne Barracks after Major General Lancelot Perowne, Major General of the Brigade of Gurkhas, who were based there. The barracks closed in 1994 as part of the withdrawal of British military presence prior to the handover of sovereignty in 1997. They were then used in the 1990s as living accommodation for the then-Lingnan College, as a training school for the Immigration Department and more recently by the Crossroads Foundation, a charity.

The barracks were used until 2008 as the final checkpoint and finish line for the annual Trailwalker event along the MacLehose Trail. In 2009, the Trailwalker route changed to end in Tai Tong, Yuen Long, however this proved to be only a temporary move. After the southern portion of the barracks facing Castle Peak Road was demolished and the new campus of Chu Hai College of Higher Education was constructed on the same site, it was re-established as the finish line of Trailwalker in 2019.

== Gallery ==
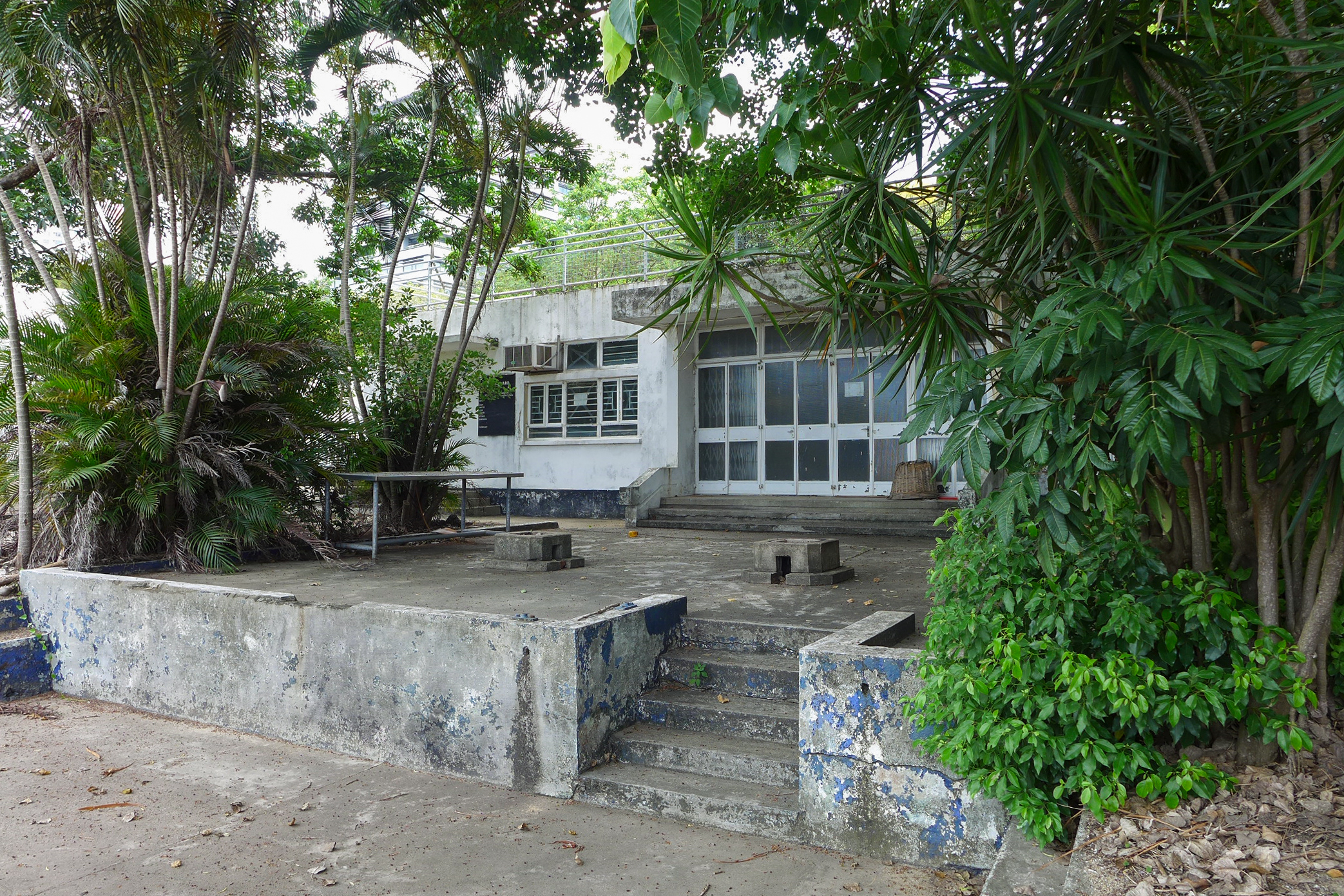
Gordon Hard building - with signage still in situ - as seen from Cafeteria New Beach.

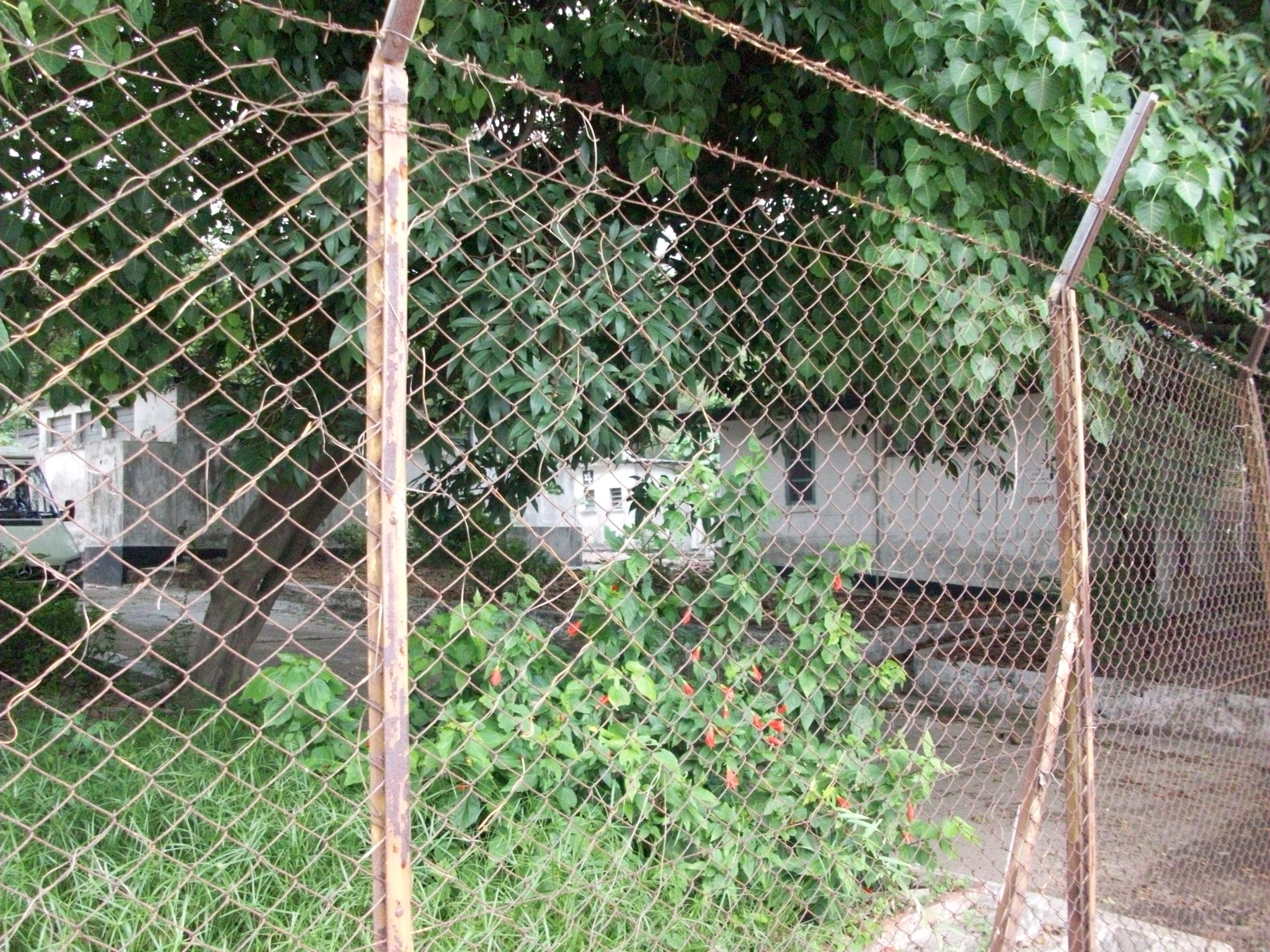
Gordon Hard building - as seen from Cafeteria New Beach.

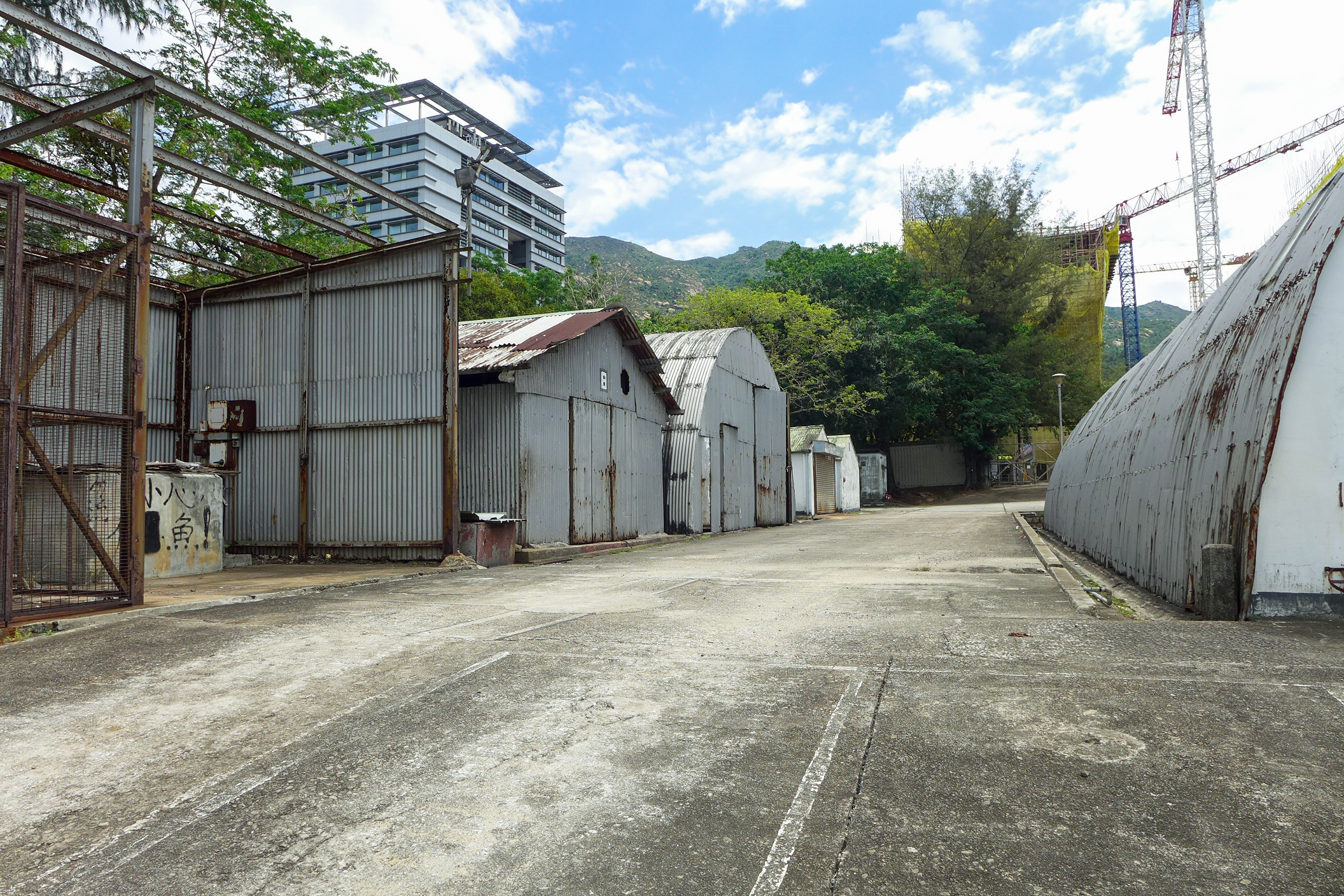
Gordon Hard Nissen huts and slipway - as seen from Cafeteria New Beach.
