= Andrew Darbyshire =

Australian businessman

Andrew Charles Darbyshire AM
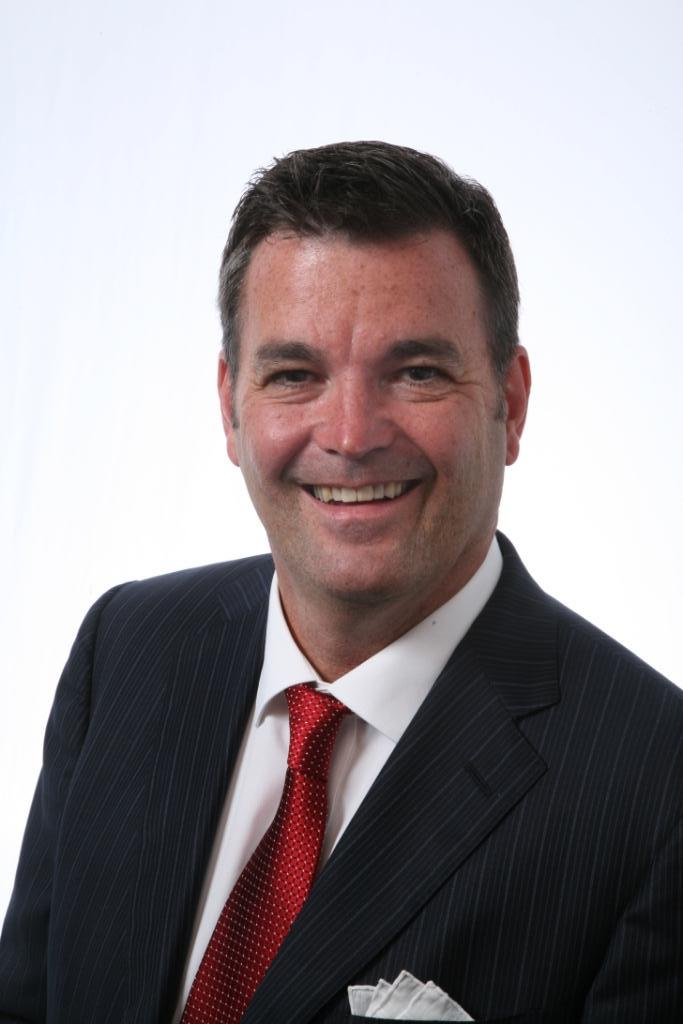
- Website: www.andrewdarbyshire.com

Andrew Charles Darbyshire AM is an Australian software company executive, philanthropist, author, and speaker. He is chairman of Pacsoft, a software development company, and is also active in several charitable and fundraising organisations.

== Early life and education ==
During his teens, Darbyshire developed a passion for electronics and radio communications, and spent hours dismantling things to see how they worked. In 1976, aged 15, he left school for an apprenticeship in radio station engineering at 3DB and studied at Royal Melbourne Institute of Technology (RMIT).

== Career ==
In 1979, Darbyshire was hired by Time and Frequency Technology, a manufacturer of broadcast equipment in Santa Clara, California, the heart of Silicon Valley.

In the mid-1980s Darbyshire founded a software company, Pacsoft. The company publishes inventory management software and now has about 35 staff and offices in Australia, New Zealand and the USA. In 2000 he sold his company to a small public company in Sydney for $7.5million. In 2004 Darbyshire bought back the business for $200,000 and has since rebuilt it to be a leader in its class throughout the world. From some 30 staff, 10 have been with him for more than 10 years.

== Philanthropic ventures ==
With help from LEK Consulting, Darbyshire established a retail fundraising arm of the Florey Institute of Neuroscience and Mental Health, a research institute in Australia. Howard Florey was the man who saved millions of lives through the mass manufacture of penicillin. Andrew established Caitlin's Fund @ The Florey, a perpetual trust that annually awards a travel scholarship to a young scientist to present a paper at a conference. They also established the Caitlin Darbyshire Trust at the Lord Mayor's Charitable Foundation, a community foundation in Australia. Darbyshire is the Founder and Patron of Caitlin's Retreat. Situated 15 kilometres from Melbourne's central business district, Caitlin's Retreat is a place that provides spacious and functional accommodation and facilities, for special needs children and their families to have a holiday together.

In 2000, Darbyshire conceived the idea of building a zoo within Children's Hospital. At this time, the plans for the new children's hospital were being drawn up and Andrew lobbied for the new Children's Hospital in Melbourne to incorporate a zoo, run by the Royal Melbourne Zoo. The hospital, due to open in 2011, will include a meerkat enclosure and large aquarium in the main foyer.

Darbyshire is or was a board member of the following foundations; Florey Neurosciences Foundation Council, Zoos Victoria Foundation, Petstock Foundation. He is a councilor of AbaF – Australian Business Arts Foundation and a member for the Committee for Melbourne and a fellow of the Australian Institute of Company Directors.

== Other roles ==
Darbyshire is chairman and Founder of Caitlin's Retreat, chairman of The Click Foundation finding a cure for epilepsy. member of SecondBite Fundraising Committee, board member of Florey Neurosciences Foundation Council, and a Fellow of the Australian Institute of Company Directors. In the past, he was a board member of the Song Room, board member of the Zoos Victoria Foundation, board member of the Petstock Foundation, and chairman of the board of CAPRA (Child Abuse Prevention Research Australia) @ Monash University, and a member of The Rees Advisory Group.

He is also an author and speaker.

== Recognition and honours ==
Darbyshire was named a Member of the Order of Australia in the 2012 Australia Day Honours for "service to the community as a supporter of research into child-related brain conditions, through contributions to special needs children and their families, and to the arts."

== Personal life ==
Darbyshire has three daughters. When one of them, Caitlin, was four months old, she was diagnosed with infantile spasms, a form of epilepsy. One month later an MRI revealed that she had a condition called tuberous sclerosis (TS), which is a rare genetic disease that causes benign tumours to grow in the brain and other organs. After many tests it was confirmed that Caitlin's were contained to her brain. Throughout 2005 and 2006 Caitlin's health deteriorated and the brain tumours kept recurring. Caitlin died on 24 August 2006.
