= Royal Far West Children's Health Scheme =

Australian charity for regional areas

Royal Far West
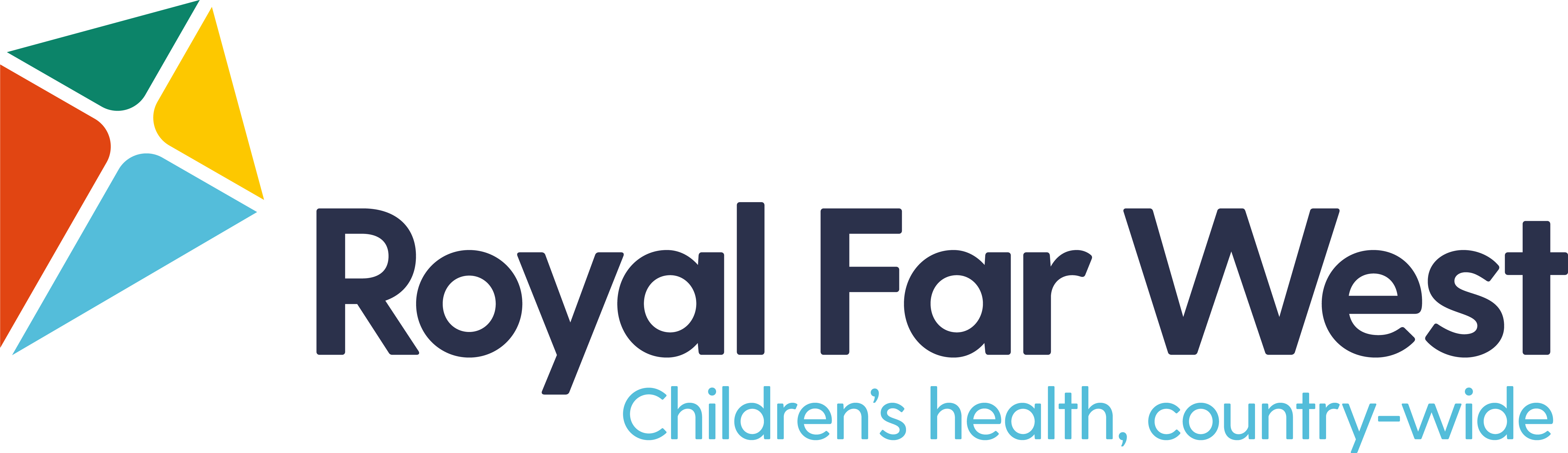
- Formation: 1924
- Founder: Reverend Stanley Drummond
- Type: Charitable organisation
- Headquarters: Drummond House, Manly, New South Wales, Australia
- Chairman: Joan H Treweeke
- Website: www.royalfarwest.org.au

Royal Far West is an Australian charity based in the Sydney suburb of Manly, concerned with improving access to developmental care for children from rural and remote areas of New South Wales. Founded in 1924 by Methodist missionary Reverend Stanley Drummond from Cobar, today Royal Far West works in partnership with families, schools, healthcare providers, local government and community groups, offering health, education and disability services for country children and their families at its Centre for Country Kids in Manly, as well as virtually via Telecare and in local rural and remote communities. Royal Far West's Centre for Country Kids opened in December 2018.

Royal Far West's Patron is the Governor of New South Wales, General The Honourable Margaret Beazley AC QC.

== History ==
The first Far West camp was organised in 1925, taking 58 children and six mothers from towns including Bourke, Brewarrina and Wilcannia to Cronulla. The following year the camp was held at Manly for the first time In Manly, the operator of a local cottage hospital, Dr George Moncrieff Barron, volunteered his services free of charge, and would continue to do so until his death. Land would later be purchased in Wentworth Street, allowing the Drummond Far West Children's Home to be built. The original facility provided 80 beds.

An idea conceived by a doctor from the remote NSW town of Trangie was adopted by Far West in 1931 which saw it operating mobile baby clinics staffed by nurses out of converted railway carriages along railway lines in the west of the state. By 1954, four carriages had been converted and were the only of their type in the world. The Far West Scheme also developed an aerial transport service in the 1930s and successfully lobbied the New South Wales Government to pay for the construction of airstrips to allow better access to communities. Stanley Drummond met Nancy Bird Walton in 1935 and soon hired her to provide the air ambulance service on behalf of the scheme. Walton used her own aircraft, and later was appointed Officer Order of the British Empire in honour of her dedication to this service in 1966. The prefix Royal was granted by Queen Elizabeth II in 1970.

Reverend Stanley Drummond died in 1943 and was succeeded by his brother, Norman Drummond, as chairman. He remained in the role until his death in 1983.

== NSW Department of Education Royal Far West School ==
A public school was established at the children's home in Manly in 1938 to cater to children requiring extended stays for ongoing treatment. The school offers education for students ranging from preschool to year 12, focusing on those with behavioral and learning difficulties who need substantial support. Siblings of the client children also attend the school during their stay in Manly. Additionally, the school participates in reading and literacy programs on a statewide level. In December 2018, the school achieved a world first by moving into the new Centre for Country Kids, effectively integrating the school with the charity's specialized pediatric services.

== Core Programs ==
=== Telecare for Kids ===
This award-winning program connects country children with specialist assessment, therapy and local capacity-building via videolink from their schools, homes and clinics. Telecare for Kids is growing rapidly, expanding into more schools and homes, with an increased emphasis on building the capacity of parents, teachers and early educators.

=== Paediatric Developmental Program (PDP) ===
The PDP is a benevolent multidisciplinary health service for children with complex developmental concerns and their families from rural and remote NSW who cannot access the local services they need. The PDP is a specialist service with expertise in supporting complex families, providing trauma-informed care and family-centred practice. This program is a partnership between NSW Health and Royal Far West.

=== Windmill ===
Windmill is Royal Far West's disability service dedicated to children aged 2–12 from rural and remote communities. In addition to intensive early intervention therapy blocks provided in Manly, the program uses Telecare to reach children in their homes and schools.
