= Andrew Brice (businessman) =

Australian businessman and philanthropist

Andrew Brice AM
- Education: University of Queensland (BComm, 1965; DEc (h.c), 2011)
- Occupation: businessman
- Known for: co-founding Wotif
- Awards: Queensland Great (2015)

Robert Andrew Creeth Brice AM is an Australian businessman and philanthropist.

He is best known for co-founding Wotif with Graeme Wood in 1999.

Brice is also known for his philanthropy which has included donating substantial amounts of money to the University of Queensland to fund scholarships which led to the establishment of the university's endowment fund.

In the 2012 Australia Day Honours, Brice was made a Member of the Order of Australia in recognition of his service to the business sector as well as for his philanthropic support of tertiary education in Queensland.

Brice was named as a Queensland Great in 2015.

Brice received his secondary education at The Friends' School in Hobart where he graduated from in 1961. He graduated from the University of Queensland with a Bachelor of Commerce in 1965. In 2011, the university awarded Brice an honorary Doctor of Economics degree. In 2013, Brice received the Vice-Chancellor's Alumni Excellence Award from the university.
