= Lorenzo Faraone =

Australian electrical and electronic engineer and professor

Lorenzo Faraone is an Australian electrical and electronic engineer and professor and head of department at the University of Western Australia.

Faraone was elected Fellow of the Australian Academy of Science in 2006 in recognition of his research in microelectronics, optoelectronics, micro-electro-mechanical systems (MEMS) and nanotechnology.

He was appointed a Member of the Order of Australia in the 2012 Australia Day Honours. He was named Fellow of the Institute of Electrical and Electronics Engineers (IEEE) in 2015 for development of semiconductor optoelectronic materials and devices.
