= Mirabad, Afghanistan =

Town in Nangarhar Province

Mirabad
- Location in Afghanistan
- Coordinates: 30°34′N 63°36′E
- Country: Afghanistan
- Province: Helmand
- District: Khanashin
- Elevation: 624 m (2,047 ft)
- Time zone: UTC+4:30

Mirabad is a town in Helmand Province, Afghanistan. It is located at 30°34'0N 63°36'0E and has an altitude of 624 metres (2050 feet).

== See also ==
- Helmand Province
