= Roberto Faraone Mennella =

Italian jewelry designer (1971–2020)

Roberto Faraone Mennella (25 September 1971 – 4 June 2020) was an Italian fine jewelry designer based in New York City.

== Personal life ==
Mennella was born and raised on his family estate in Torre del Greco, a town just south of Naples.

After graduating from high school, Faraone Mennella attended law school in Italy at the University of Naples Federico II. Afterwards he moved to New York City to acquire a degree in Design Marketing at Parsons The New School for Design.

Mennella was openly gay, and was in a relationship with Amedeo Scognamiglio, who was also his business partner.

Mennella died from cancer in Torre del Greco on 4 June 2020 at age 48.

== Career ==
In 2001, Mennella and Scognamiglio launched a fine jewelry line called Faraone Mennella by R.F.M.A.S. Group.

After being prominently featured in the television show, Sex and the City, a profile of Faraone Mennella was featured as the cover story of WWD, which got the attention of retailers such as Neiman Marcus and Bergdorf Goodman. The stores began to carry the designer's line immediately thereafter. In 2004, the designer duo started a 5-year collaboration with Carolina Herrera. They designed for the fashion house a collection of one-of-a-kind pieces inspired by Herrera's couture gowns. Following the success of the collaboration, the next year the design duo launched the Faraone Mennella Couture Collection.

In 2006, the designers launched AMEDEO, a collection of contemporary jewelry featuring modern cameos, dedicated to the Scognamiglio's family heritage of Italian cameo artistry .

In 2013, the Italian designer duo launched a fashion jewelry diffusion line designed and sold exclusively on Home Shopping Network in the United States and on QVC internationally.

The Faraone Mennella and Amedeo collections have been featured in Vogue, Elle, The New York Times, W Magazine, V Magazine, Town and Country, Style.com, and Departures, and have been carried by Neiman Marcus, Bergdorf Goodman, Harrods, Net-a-Porter, and Moda Operandi. Their flagship boutique is located on the Upper East Side of Manhattan in New York City and their other locations are in London, Porto Cervo, and Capri. Besides Sex and the city, pieces from Faraone Mennella and Amedeo have been featured in The Devil Wears Prada, Gossip Girl, Will & Grace, Wall Street, and It's Complicated.

== Awards ==
- 2006 Rising Star Award by Fashion Group International
- 2007 TIME Magazine's 100 Most Influential Designers in their Field
- 2017 the "Andrea Palladio Award" by the Vicenza Oro fair for "Best Italian Jewelry Designer"
