= Crossroads Foundation =

Hong Kong non-profit charity

- 國際十字路會
- Formation: 1995
- Type: Non-profit charity
- Headquarters: Tuen Mun
- Key people: Malcolm and Sally Begbie
- Affiliations: United Nations High Commissioner for Refugees
- Staff: 70
- Volunteers: (6000)
- Website: Official website
- Formerly called: Crossroads International

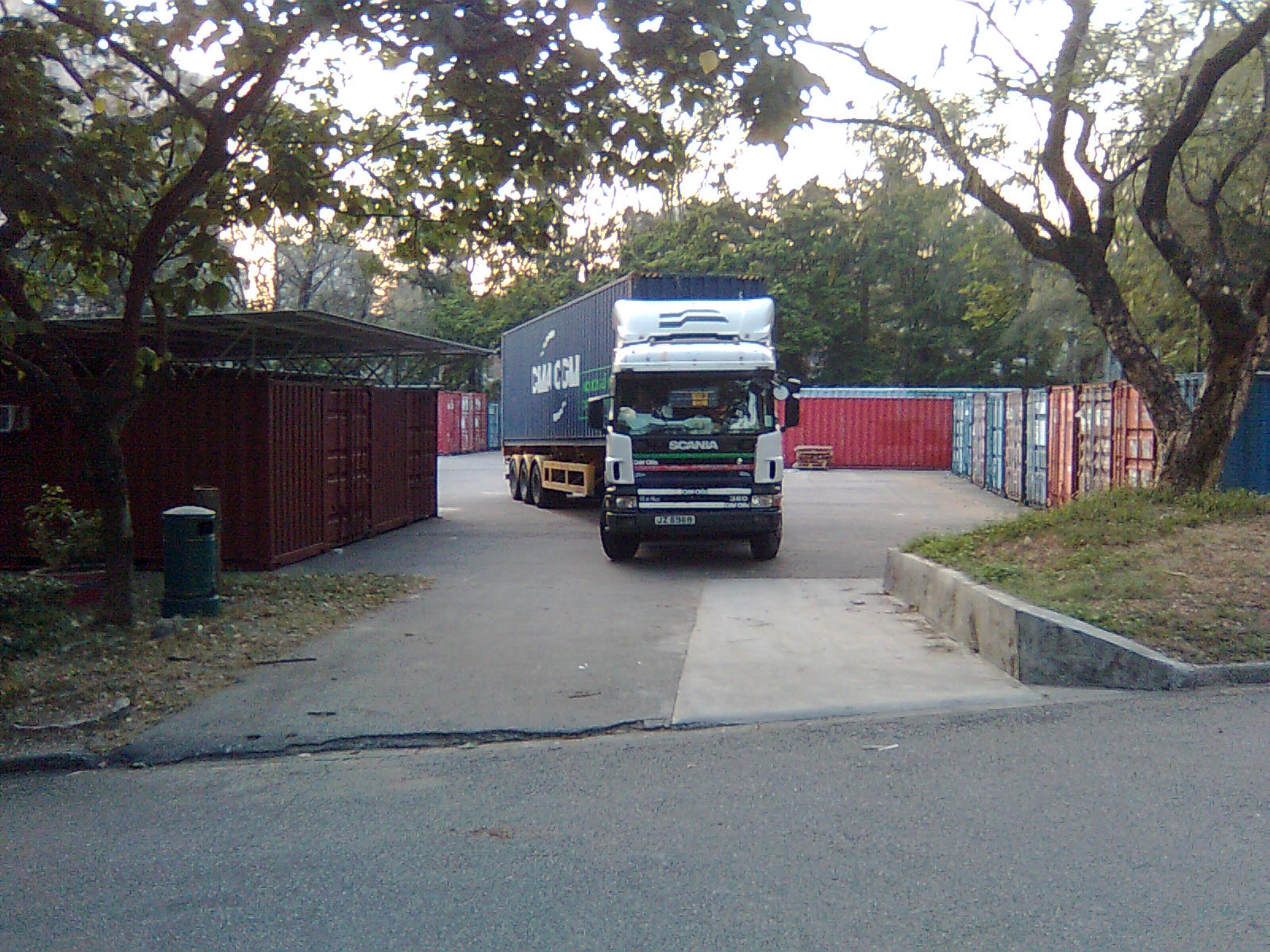
Container Landing

Crossroads Foundation is a non-profit charity based in Hong Kong which connects those with resources and those who need help. They do this through collecting quality excess and second-hand goods within Hong Kong, refurbishing them if necessary, and then distributing them to those in need within Hong Kong and internationally.

Crossroads also runs interactive and immersive simulations to give participants an experience of needs like urban poverty, refugees, HIV/Aids and blindness, through their Global X-perience programmes. Crossroads supports fair trade and social enterprise with a Global Handicrafts marketplace selling fairly traded goods from around the world and their Silk Road Cafe, serving fair trade coffee and other beverages and snacks. Crossroads' online project, Global Hand, offers a website where companies and others from the for-profit world can find non-profit projects to partner on. Global Hand has offices in both Hong Kong and Tunbridge Wells, UK.

A bicycle repair workshop, staffed by volunteers, refurbishes donated old bikes for despatch overseas to provide mobility, or locally to needy children and families.

== History ==
Crossroads began charitable work in 1995. Malcolm, an accountant, and Sally, a public relations consultant, had volunteered their expertise to charities assisting communities in Northern China during the floods of 1995. Upon being asked by one of the charities to send aid, the Begbies collected donations throughout Hong Kong and sent an initial shipment of nineteen boxes. As organizations began requesting more aid, the Begbies sent shipments of 72, 136, and finally 248 boxes. Hong Kong’s Social Welfare Department noted their growth, and Crossroads became a registered NGO.

Three weeks after its inception, Crossroads has already received ten tons of donated goods. After providing medical equipment to a clinic in Ghana, Crossroads began receiving requests from around the world. The influx of requests prompted Crossroads to create Global Hand. According to the Begbies, “We thought, ‘Surely there should be a match-making service online for companies who want to help charities!’ There wasn't, though, so we built one. Later, the United Nations asked us to build a version for them because they, too, wanted companies to help them battle world need.”

Crossroads has expanded their operations throughout their existence. Crossroads opened a fair-trade marketplace to support families and small businesses from impoverished communities worldwide. In 2005, Crossroads put on a ‘poverty simulation’ for business leaders in Hong Kong. Participants had to build slum homes and live in the simulated poverty environment for 24 hours. Crossroads now has six simulations and thousands of participants every year.

In August 2015, the Town Planning Board sought to reclaim the entire site for housing but after discussions, the Foundation was allowed to remain on the eastern half of the site, where most of its daily operations take place. The western portion was then rezoned for a luxury housing development.

The site remains owned by the Hong Kong government and is only made available to Crossroads on a short-term lease, hindering the organisations ability to expand its services.

== Organization ==
Crossroads Foundation currently operates at Perowne Barracks in Hong Kong, formerly home to the Brigade of Gurkhas. The full-time staff are all volunteers who raise their own income so that they can live and work at Crossroads. Thousands of part-time staff and volunteers come from around the world to volunteer at Crossroads every year.

=== Global Distribution ===
Every year, private donors of all types donate goods of all types to Crossroads. Crossroads has received goods from manufacturers, hotels, educational institutions, hospitals, businesses, and individuals alike. The items Crossroads receives are designated to one of their fourteen processing departments where the items are examined and recorded. Volunteers inspect all donated items to ensure they meet high quality standards for distribution. These goods are then distributed to people in need through the Global Distribution department. About 60% of the donated goods crossroads receives go back to the people of Hong Kong, and about 40% are distributed around the world. Locally, goods are distributed by referrals from the Social Welfare Department or through registered NGOs. Crossroads has distributed, “building supplies, vehicles, computers, medical provision, household furniture, office furniture, educational furniture and equipment, bedding and textile supplies, electrical items, household goods, clothing, stationery, bicycles, books and educational toys.” Staff at Crossroads describe Global Distribution as, “a crossroads between need and resource.” Crossroads has distributed goods to over 90 countries throughout Asia, Africa, Europe, South and Central America, and the Middle East. Transport companies will often provide transportation for discounted rates, and Crossroads fundraises to meet these costs in order to remove the burden from the recipients.

=== Global Hand ===
Global Hand is a website that matches entities that wish to donate with those in need. It is described as, “a non-profit brokerage facilitating public/private partnership.” Most notably, Global Hand has assisted and advanced the distribution of aid during the Ebola Crisis and the Syrian refugee crisis, and has provided services in Rwanda, Sudan, and Romania. Global Hand works with the United Nations to facilitate interaction between companies and UN projects.

=== Global Handicrafts ===
Crossroads provides fair trade goods at their Global Handicrafts Marketplace and their fair trade cafe. By supplying fair trade goods, Global Handicrafts facilitates not only job growth in developing communities worldwide, but also provides sanitary, healthy, and humane working conditions for those who sell their products. Global Handicrafts trades products from Asia, Africa, Europe, South America, Central Asia and the Middle East.

=== Global Experience ===
With the motto, “I can't understand a man unless I walk a mile in his shoes”, Crossroads has developed a series of simulations that allow participants to step into the shoes of suffering people. In 2005, Crossroads invited local leaders to spend 24 hours living in simulated slums in a simulation Crossroads dubbed “Slum Survivor”. Each participant was given a pile of debris and asked to build ‘homes’ that they would use for the entirety of the experience. “They ate ‘survival’ food on banana leaves, or from garbage bags. They fought the wiles of loan sharks. They met the dog eat dog struggles of the market place. We called this Slum Survivor. Because they survived, the participants earned sponsorship from those who supported them.”

After “Slum Survivor”, Crossroads received numerous requests from corporations, consulates, universities and school groups asking for similar simulations. Global X-Periance has simulated poverty, blindness, HIV/Aids, and a day in the life of a refugee for over 100,000 participants in a dozen countries.

== Notable projects ==
At the request of the UNHCR, the Crossroads Global X-perience team participates in the World Economic Forum, hosting their Refugee Run simulation for executives from all over the world to obtain an insight into what it is like to be a refugee.

Again working with the UNHCR and then with the UN directly, Crossroads initiated the Global Hand project to build a web portal that allows those willing to contribute to the UN's relief efforts to be matched with the relevant UN team, and for the UN teams to post their requirements. This web portal was officially launched at the 2010 World Economic Forum and is the model for the UN business site business.un.org.
