= James Davidson (antiquarian) =

- Born: August 15, 1793; Tower Hill, London, England
- Died: February 29, 1864 (aged 70); Secktor House, Axminster, Devon, England
- Occupations: Antiquary, bibliographer
- Notable work: Bibliotheca Devoniensis (1852)
- Spouse: Mary Bridge (m. 1823)
- Children: 5 (including James Bridge Davidson)

James Davidson (1793–1864) was an English antiquary and bibliographer.

== Life ==
The eldest son of James Davidson of Tower Hill, London, a stationer and deputy-lieutenant of the Tower of London, and Ann, his wife, only daughter of William Sawyer of Ipswich, he was born at Tower Hill on 15 August 1793. When not quite thirty years old, he bought the estate of Secktor, near Axminster in Devon. He enlarged the small cottage, and lived there for the rest of his life.

Davidson died at Secktor House, Axminster, on 29 February 1864, and was buried in the town cemetery.

== Works ==
Davidson's major work of local history was Bibliotheca Devoniensis; a Catalogue of the Printed Books relating to the County of Devon (1852, supplement 1862). It was based on wide research in libraries. Notes on the Antiquities of Devonshire (1861) went up to the Norman Conquest. On the Axe Valley, he wrote:

- The British and Roman Remains in the vicinity of Axminster, 1833;
- History of Axminster Church, 1835;
- History of Newenham Abbey, Devon, 1843 (Newenham Abbey is situated about a mile south of Axminster, and George Oliver had assistance with his account of it in Monasticon Diocesis Exoniensis from Davidson);
- Axminster during the Civil War, 1851.

Another work was A Glossary to the Obsolete and Unused Words and Phrases of the Holy Scriptures in the Authorised English Version (1850). Davidson also wrote for Notes and Queries, Pulman's Weekly News and the Gentleman's Magazine.

== Family ==
Davidson married, on 6 March 1823, Mary, only daughter of Thomas Bridge of Frome St. Quentin, Dorset, and their issue was two sons and three daughters. His eldest son, James Bridge Davidson, who died on 8 October 1885, aged 61, had similar interests. Many books from their Secktor House library were put on sale by William George of Bristol in 1887.

== Notes ==
Attribution

This article incorporates text from a publication now in the public domain: Stephen, Leslie, ed. (1888). "Davidson, James". Dictionary of National Biography. Vol. 14. London: Smith, Elder & Co.
