= The Far West Baby Health Clinic Cars =

Former rail service in New South Wales, Australia

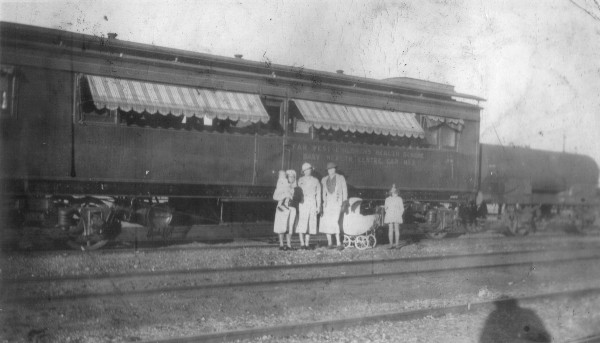
The first Car No. 3 at Baradine, 1936

The Royal Far West Children's Health Scheme operated a number of railway carriages in New South Wales, Australia as Baby Health Clinics. These were attached to regular passenger and goods trains for movement between stations in the western regions of the state.

The first carriage was made available for their use in 1931 and the last survivor was taken out of traffic in 1975. All vehicles were converted by the New South Wales Government Railways from obsolete passenger carriages.
