= Operation Outreach =

Operation Outreach was the Australian Defence Force's (ADF) contribution to the Northern Territory National Emergency Response (NTNER).

The NTNER (also referred to as "the intervention") is a package of changes to welfare provision, law enforcement, land tenure and other measures, introduced by the Australian federal government under John Howard in 2007 to address child sexual abuse in Northern Territory Aboriginal communities. The package was the Federal government's response to the publication of Little Children are Sacred, a Territory government report that found neglect and abuse of Aboriginal children had reached crisis levels. It received bipartisan parliamentary support, but was criticized by some. Former Prime Minister Kevin Rudd had continued to support the response, whilst making some adjustments to its implementation. The former Prime Minister Julia Gillard has and continues to show her support.

== Role ==
ADF support to the NTNER, known as Joint Task Force (JTF) 641, included supplying contracted trade services (project management, engineering advice, construction and transport) to set up eighteen new police stations and safe houses in five remote communities. The military force also provided outbound logistics (linguistic and long-range communications support) through the wet season to child health check teams.
