= Jeffrey Lee =

Jeffrey Lee AM (born 1971) member of the Djok clan and the senior custodian of the 12,028 hectare Koongarra region in Australia's Northern Territory which is believed to contain a significant uranium deposit.

The land owned by the clan is surrounded by Kakadu National Park. He has become famous since he doesn't want to sell the high-valued fields to the French energy giant Areva who plans to extract 14,000 tonnes of uranium worth more than $5 billion.

In June 2011, UNESCO decided to make Koongarra a World Heritage Site and the process of incorporating it into the Kakadu National Park began.
