= 2016 Australia Day Honours =

The 2016 Australia Day Honours were announced on 26 January 2016 by the Governor General of Australia, Sir Peter Cosgrove.

The Australia Day Honours are the first of the two major annual honours lists, announced on Australia Day (26 January), with the other being the Queen's Birthday Honours which are announced on the second Monday in June.

== Order of Australia ==
=== Companion of the Order of Australia (AC) ===
Order of Australia (Civil) ribbon

Order of Australia (Military) ribbon

==== General Division ====
Recipient	Citation	Notes
Doctor Susan Alberti AO	For eminent service to the community, particularly through philanthropic and fundraising support for a range of medical research, education and sporting organisations, as an advocate for improved health care services for the disadvantaged, and to young women as a role model and mentor.	
Professor Chennupati Jagadish	For eminent service to physics and engineering, particularly in the field of nanotechnology, to education as a leading academic, researcher, author and mentor, and through executive roles with national and international scientific advisory institutions.	
Doctor Robert Law Joss	For eminent service to business and finance through executive roles with major banking institutions, and as a contributor to taxation policy and reform, to education as an academic and administrator, to professional organisations, and to the community	
Rod Laver MBE	For eminent service to tennis as a player, representative and mentor, at the national and international level, and as a role model for young sportsmen and women.	
Allan Myers AO, QC	For eminent service to the community through philanthropic leadership in support of major visual arts, higher education, medical research and not-for-profit organisations, to the law, and to professional learning programs.	
Maria Josephine Myers AO	For eminent service to the community through philanthropic leadership in support of major visual and performing arts, cultural, education, and not-for-profit organisations, and to the advancement of the understanding of Indigenous rock art.	
Emeritus Professor Mary Josephine O'Kane AO	For eminent service to science and engineering, as a contributor to national policy development and governance, to the promotion of technology research and future energy supply, to higher education, and as a role model for young scientists.	
Emeritus Professor Robert Arthur Ouvrier OAM	For eminent service to medicine, particularly to the discipline of paediatric neurology, through pioneering efforts in neuromuscular research, to a range of medical professional organisations at the national and international level, and as an author and educator.	
His Honour John Pascoe AO, CVO	For eminent service to the law and to the judiciary, through support for improved access to the justice system for Indigenous peoples, to legal administration and higher education, and as an advocate for the prevention of international trafficking of children.	
The Honourable Mike Rann CNZM	For eminent service to the Parliament and the community of South Australia, particularly as Premier, through broad-ranging policy design and implementation, and to the advancement of Australia's diplomatic, trade and cultural relationships.	

=== Officer of the Order of Australia (AO) ===
==== General Division ====
Recipient	Citation	Notes
Professor Marilyn Anne Anderson	For distinguished service to science, and to higher education, particularly to biochemistry and molecular biology, as an academic and researcher, and to professional associations.	
Michael Andrew	For distinguished service to the accountancy profession at the national and international level, and to a range of business, anti-corruption, finance and community organisations.	
Michael James Ball AM	For distinguished service to the community through leadership roles with major urban planning and heritage preservation organisations, and to the promotion of the history of cricket.	
John Gavan Breen	For distinguished service to the Indigenous community through the preservation of languages, to the development of orthographies, and to education.	
Judith Myrea Brewer	For distinguished service to people with a disability, particularly to those with Autism Spectrum Disorders, to refugees living in rural areas, to women, and to education.	
Andrew Alexander Briger	For distinguished service to the arts, particularly to orchestral music performance as a leading conductor, and as founder of the Australian World Orchestra.	
Elizabeth Broderick	For distinguished service to the community through seminal contributions to human rights, to the prevention of violence against women and children, to public administration, and to the law.	
Geraldine Brooks	For distinguished service to literature as a leading author, as an advocate for improved Indigenous literacy, as a role model for young writers, and as a journalist.	
The late Emeritus Professor Christopher Noel Candlin	For distinguished service to higher education, particularly in the fields of linguistics and communication research, and as an academic, teacher and mentor.	
Drew Clarke PSM	For distinguished service to public administration, to communications and energy policy initiatives and reform, and to the spatial information industry.	
Graeme Alistair Clugston	For distinguished service to medicine, and to the international community of Nepal, particularly to people with leprosy, and to global health and nutrition.	
Professor David Leon Copolov, OAM	For distinguished service to tertiary education administration, to medicine in the field of psychiatry, to mental health research, and to the community.	
Professor Minas Theodore Coroneo	For distinguished service to ophthalmology, to the research and development of innovative surgical technologies and devices, and to eye health in regional and Indigenous communities.	
Emeritus Professor Peter Drysdale AM	For distinguished service to Australia-Asia trade and economic relations, particularly with Japan, to public policy development, to education, and as a mentor of young economists.	
Brian William Easton	For distinguished service to conservation and the environment through leadership roles with a range of organisations, to public administration in Western Australia, and to aged care.	
Professor Henry Ergas	For distinguished service to infrastructure economics, and to higher education, to public policy development and review, and as a supporter of emerging artists.	
Bruce French	For distinguished service to agricultural science through the provision of edible plant information for improved food security, nutrition, and improved health outcomes for people in developing countries.	
Ann Margaret Harding	For distinguished service to education in the field of applied economics and social policy analysis, as an academic, researcher and author, and to professional organisations.	
Dr Peter Anthony Holdsworth	For distinguished service to veterinary science, particularly to animal parasitology and pharmaceutical development, and to professional scientific organisations.	
Emeritus Professor Douglas Edgar Joshua, AM	For distinguished service to medicine, and to medical education, as an haematologist and academic, to myeloma research, and to public health organisations.	
Emeritus Professor Gwendolen Anne Jull	For distinguished service to medical education in the field of physiotherapy, as an academic, researcher and administrator, and to professional associations.	
Anne Kantor	For distinguished service to the community through philanthropic support for a range of environmental, social welfare, arts and educational organisations, and to psychotherapy.	
Robert George Kirby	For distinguished service to business through the movie, cinema entertainment, and theme park sectors, to the film industry as a producer, and to philanthropy.	
Professor Kate Leslie	For distinguished service to medicine in the field of anaesthesia and pain management as a clinician and researcher, to higher education, and to professional medical groups.	
Professor Warwick McKibbin	For distinguished service to education as an economist, particularly in the area of global climate policy, and to financial institutions and international organisations.	
Professor Finlay Alistair MacRae	For distinguished service to medicine in the field of gastroenterology and genomic disorders as a clinician and academic, and to human health through the Human Variome Project.	
Brian James Mallon	For distinguished service to the community, particularly to children, through roles with medical and charitable foundations, and to the broadcast media industry.	
Professor Leon Mann	For distinguished service to the humanities and social sciences, to tertiary education and professional organisations, and to Jewish history and culture.	
Tracey Moffatt	For distinguished service to the visual and performing arts as a photographer and film maker, and as a mentor and supporter of, and role model for, Indigenous artists.	
Dr Jonathon Craig Mudge	For distinguished service to science, particularly through pioneering initiatives in the information technology sector, as a researcher and author, and as a mentor of young scientists.	
His Excellency Tony Negus APM	For distinguished service to public administration, particularly through senior law enforcement roles, to governance reform, and to national and international inter-agency counter-terrorism cooperation.	
The Honourable Dr Brendan Nelson	For distinguished service to the Parliament of Australia, to the community, to the advancement of Australia's international relations, and to major cultural institutions.	
Professor Robyn Elizabeth O'Hehir	For distinguished service to clinical immunology and respiratory medicine as an academic and clinician, to tertiary education, and to specialist health and medical organisations.	
Dr Simon Robert Oldfield	For distinguished service to science, particularly in the areas of defence materiel, nutrition, and improved equipment for military personnel, and to international research collaboration.	
Professor Eleanor Joan Ozanne-Smith	For distinguished service to public health, particularly in the area of accident and injury prevention, to forensic medicine, and to higher education as an academic.	
George Pappas	For distinguished service to the community through roles with tertiary education, medical research and defence organisations, and to business, particularly management consulting.	
Dr Michael Charles Pryles AM	For distinguished service to the law in the area of arbitration, at the national and international level, and to legal education as an academic and author.	
The Very Reverend Canon David Richardson OBE	For distinguished service to religion, and to the Anglican Church of Australia, through international representational, ecumenical development, and interfaith cooperation roles.	
Professor Peter David Sly	For distinguished service to medical research and education in the area of paediatric respiratory medicine, as an academic, author, and clinician, and to professional organisations.	
Emeritus Professor Susan Hilary Spence	For distinguished service to mental health research, particularly to prevention and treatment in young people, to tertiary education, and as a mentor.	
Professor Susan Mary Stocklmayer AM	For distinguished service to science communication and education through the development of academic outreach programs and public awareness initiatives, both nationally and internationally.	
Sister Kathleen Mary Tierney	For distinguished service to the community through roles with health, education, aged care, and social welfare organisations, and to the Catholic Church in Australia.	
The late Professor Nicholas Antony Tonti-Filippini	For distinguished service to tertiary education, particularly in the area of bioethics, through academic leadership and advisory roles, and to medical research.	
Dr Patricia Vickers-Rich	For distinguished service to the earth sciences, particularly palaeontology, as an academic, to education curriculum development, and to international scientific organisations.	
David Walsh	For distinguished service to the visual arts through the establishment of the Museum of Old and New Art, and as a supporter of cultural, charitable, sporting and education groups.	

=== Member of the Order of Australia (AM) ===
==== General Division ====
Recipient	Citation	Notes
Richard Ackland	For significant service to the print and television media industries, particularly through reporting on legal issues, and as a publisher.	
Dr Bronte Adams	For significant service to the community through executive roles in business, publishing, health and industry innovation, and cultural organisations.	
The Honourable Michael Aird	For significant service to the Parliament and community of Tasmania, particularly to infrastructure development and microeconomic reform.	
Tina Arena	For significant service to the music industry as a singer, songwriter, and recording artist, and as a supporter of charitable groups.	
Pauline Barry	For significant service to primary education, and through contributions to a range of community organisations.	
The Honourable John Batt	For significant service to the law and to the judiciary in Victoria, to legal scholarship, and to the Anglican Church of Australia.	
Captain Clifford Beazley	For significant service to the marine transport industry through the development of training facilities for ship handling and navigation.	
Patsy Biscoe	For significant service to the performing arts, and to the television industry, as a children's entertainer, and to the community of the Barossa Valley.	
Professor Mari Botti	For significant service to nursing, and to medical education, as an academic and author, and to pain management research.	
Jan Bowen	For significant service to the performing arts, particularly to youth orchestral music performance, and to the community.	
Harvey Broadbent	For significant service to the literary arts as an author and publisher, to the television industry as a producer, and to tertiary education.	
Ian Carlisle	For significant service to medicine in the field of faciomaxillary and reconstructive surgery, to professional organisations, and to the international community.	
Joseph Catanzariti	For significant service to the law, to legal education, to labour and employment relations, and to professional legal bodies.	
Dr Barry Catchlove	For significant service to medical administration, particularly health care systems, to international business cooperation, and to education.	
Rodney Chadwick	For significant service to business and manufacturing through leadership roles, and as an advocate and fundraiser for tertiary education.	
John Chalk	For significant service to rugby league as an administrator at the state and national level, and to Indigenous and non-Indigenous youth.	
Richard Champion de Crespigny	For significant service to the aviation industry both nationally and internationally, particularly to flight safety, and to the community.	
Dr Jay Chandra	For significant service to medicine in the field of ophthalmology as a clinician, and to the international community through eye care programs.	
Associate Professor David Cherry ASM	For significant service to golf through executive roles, and to pain management medicine as an academic and researcher.	
Dr Barry Chesson	For significant service to the community in the field of occupational health science, to professional associations, and to tertiary education.	
Noel Cislowski	For significant service to the performing arts, particularly to speech and drama, to music, and to a range of community organisations.	
Keryn Clark	For significant service to the community of Timor Leste through aid, water and hygiene development programs, and to women.	
Robert Clark	For significant service to athletics in South Australia, particularly through the City-Bay Fun Run, and to the community.	
The late Kenneth Clifford	For significant service to regional sport in the Hunter Valley, and through contributions to the development of sports training facilities.	
Emeritus Professor John Coll	For significant service to tertiary education as an administrator, academic and researcher, to the environment, and to the community.	
Dr Timothy Cooper	For significant service to medicine in the field of plastic and reconstructive surgery as a clinician, and to professional medical associations.	
Ian Cootes	For significant service to the road transport industry, to the development of improved safety and efficiency standards, and to philanthropy.	
Robin Crawford	For significant service to the community through leadership roles with cancer support, mental health and social welfare groups.	
Dr Marion de Lemos	For significant service to education, and to youth, particularly to students with learning difficulties, and as a researcher and author.	
Raply Devlin QC	For significant service to surf lifesaving, particularly as an administrator, and to the law.	
Professor Carol Dickenson	For significant service to tertiary education as a senior administrator, and to professional academic standards and development.	
Scott Didier	For significant service to children through roles with a range of charitable organisations, as a supporter of sporting clubs, and to business.	
Melissa Doyle	For significant service to the community through representational roles with a range of charitable groups, and to the broadcast media.	
Dr Helen Drennen	For significant service to secondary education through leadership roles, to professional bodies, and to the community.	
Dr Nigel Du Pre Chamier OAM	For significant service to the community of Brisbane, particularly to economic development programs and heritage preservation initiatives.	
Fay Duncan	For significant service to community health as a leader, supporter and advocate for cancer research and treatment programs.	
Peter Dundas-Smith	For significant service to the fishing, aquaculture and seafood industries through innovation, research and development.	
Dr Ross Dunn	For significant service to dentistry as a clinician, to public dental health initiatives in developing countries, and to professional organisations.	
James Dwyer OAM	For significant service to the community through fundraising support for youth, health care and medical education initiatives, and to the law.	
Virginia Edwards	For significant service to the community as an advocate for the welfare, care and support of sick and injured animals, and to philanthropy.	
Dr Vlasis Efstathis OAM, RFD	For significant service to community health through leadership roles with a range of organisations, and to medicine as a practitioner.	
The Honourable David Evans	For significant service to the Parliament and community of Victoria, to local government, and to aged care, education, and land conservation groups.	
Christopher Faisandier	For significant service to the education sector, particularly through advisory, strategic human resource and organisational development roles.	
Emeritus Professor Norman Feather	For significant service to higher education as an academic, author and editor, to the social and behavioural sciences, and to professional bodies.	
Maxwell Fehring	For significant service to the dairy industry through a range of roles, to local government, and to the community of the Gannawarra Shire.	
Margaret Fisk OAM	For significant service to members of the Australian Defence Force with a disability, and to their families, through support organisations.	
Professor Jeffrey Flack	For significant service to medicine in the field of endocrinology as a clinician, and to diabetes research, management and education.	
Dr Mary Foley	For significant service to public administration in New South Wales, particularly to the health care sector, to education, and to the community.	
Graham Ford	For significant service to surf lifesaving through a range of leadership roles at the national and international level, and to the community.	
Dr Peter Ford	For significant service to medicine and to professional medical organisations, to health care delivery for the aged, and to the community.	
Joseph Forshaw	For significant service to ornithology as an author and researcher, and as a contributor to a range of wildlife conservation organisations.	
Peter Freedman	For significant service to business, manufacturing and export in the professional audio sector, and through philanthropic support for cultural events.	
Jackie French	For significant service to literature as an author of children's books, and as an advocate for improved youth literacy.	
Ronald Fritschy	For significant service to higher education governance and administration in Queensland, and to the mining and resources sectors.	
Barry Frost	For significant service to motor sports at the national and international level, particularly as a time-keeper.	
Professor Mark Frydenberg	For significant service to medicine as a clinician, educator and author in the speciality of urology, and to professional medical organisations.	
David Gallop	For significant service to sports administration through executive roles with football and rugby league organisations, and to the community.	
Armando Gardiman	For significant service to the law, and to the community, through the provision of legal advice to asbestos disease research institutions, and to football.	
Dr Michael Gardner	For significant service to cardio-thoracic medicine as a surgeon and teacher in Australia and overseas, and to professional medical groups.	
Nicholas Garratt	For significant service to rowing, particularly through coaching positions with Australian men's and women's Olympic teams.	
Douglas Gautier	For significant service to arts administration through leadership roles with a range of institutions, to tertiary education, and to the community.	
John Gollings	For significant service to photography through the documentation of iconic architectural landmarks in Australia and the Asia-Pacific region.	
Dr David W. Goodall	For significant service to science as an academic, researcher and author in the area of plant ecology and natural resources management.	
Dr Myrle Gray	For significant service to rural medicine in Tasmania, to professional medical associations, as a general practitioner, and to the community.	
Lawrence Green	For significant service to agriculture, particularly to horticultural sustainability, research and production agronomy, and to the community.	
Anthony Gray	For significant service to the community as a supporter of medical research and the arts, and to the mining industry.	
Professor Susan Groundwater-Smith	For significant service to education as an academic and researcher, as an advocate for teacher professional learning, and as a mentor.	
The Honourable Deirdre Grusovin	For significant service to the Parliament and the community of New South Wales, to education administration, and to social welfare.	
Ann Haddon	For significant service to children's literature, as a fundraiser and supporter of Indigenous literacy, and to professional organisations.	
John Hancock	For significant service to Australia-Thailand relations through contributions to bi-lateral business development opportunities and networking.	
David Handley	For significant service to the visual arts through the promotion of sculpture, and as a supporter of, and advocate for, artists with a disability.	
Craig Hassall	For significant service to the performing arts, particularly to opera, ballet and theatre, through executive, advisory and administrative roles.	
Frank Haven	For significant service to surf lifesaving, particularly in New South Wales, through a range of roles, and to the community.	
Peter Hayes	For significant service to the Australian winemaking and grape growing industry, to viticultural research, and to tertiary education.	
Professor Karen Healy	For significant service to community welfare in the field of social work, particularly child protection, and to higher education and research.	
Alan Hewitt	For significant service to ecumenism and inter-faith dialogue, and to the Uniting Church in Australia.	
Lleyton Hewitt	For significant service to tennis as a player at the national and international level, and to the community.	
Gillian Hicks	For significant service to the promotion of peace in the community through public engagement, education and network building initiatives.	
Associate Professor Andrew Hill	For significant service to education as a visual artist and academic, to multiculturalism, and through innovative art programs for young refugees.	
The Reverend Dr John Hirt	For significant service to the Uniting Church in Australia, particularly through theological direction, to youth, and to the community.	
Geraldine Hogarth	For significant service to the Indigenous community of regional Western Australia through the provision of improved ear healthcare for children.	
Jennifer Holliday	For significant service to softball as a player and coach at the national and international level, and through senior administrative roles.	
Mitchell Hooke	For significant service to business, particularly to the mining and minerals sector, to policy development, research and trade opportunities, and to the Indigenous community.	
Shane Howard	For significant service to the performing arts as a singer, songwriter and guitarist, to the recording industry, and to Indigenous musicians.	
Dr Ralph Hultgren	For significant service to the arts, particularly music education, as an academic, composer and publisher, and to professional organisations.	
Kim Jacobs	For significant service to business through a range of senior roles, to Australia-Israel relations, to higher education, and to the community.	
Ann James	For significant service to children's literature as an author and illustrator, and through advocacy roles with literacy and professional bodies.	
Professor Hartmut Kaebernick	For significant service to the manufacturing sciences through the promotion and advancement of life cycle engineering product design.	
Dr Abdul Kazi	For significant service to secondary education, to the Islamic and multicultural communities of Victoria, and to interfaith dialogue.	
Dr John Keeler	For significant service to tertiary legal education in South Australia as a senior academic and author, and as a mentor of law students.	
Peter Kell	For significant service to the Anglican Church of Australia, to social welfare programs and delivery, and to the community of the Illawarra.	
Michael Kennedy	For significant service to wildlife conservation and preservation, as an advocate and supporter, and to environmental policy development.	
Gendrie Klein-Breteler	For significant service to the community, particularly to the disadvantaged, through social welfare organisations, and to women and girls.	
Kaaren Koomen	For significant service to the information technology and communications sector, to business through executive roles, and to education.	
Professor Philip Kuchel	For significant service to science in the field of biochemistry, as an academic, author and researcher, and to professional organisations.	
Professor Gustav Lehrer	For significant service to tertiary mathematics education as an academic and researcher, and to professional and community groups.	
David Liddy	For significant service to the banking and finance sectors through a range of executive roles, and to the community of Queensland.	
The Honourable Lou Lieberman	For significant service to the Parliaments of Australia and Victoria through a range of portfolio responsibilities, and to the community of Albury/Wodonga.	
Professor David Mabberley	For significant service to horticultural science, particularly to plant taxonomy and tropical botany, as an academic, researcher and author.	
Emeritus Professor Kevin McConkey	For significant service to tertiary education administration, to the field of psychology as an academic, and to professional associations.	
Tonya McCusker	For significant service to the community of Western Australia through charitable and philanthropic roles, and to children and young people.	
Jennifer McGregor	For significant service to Australia-Asia relations, particularly through educational, cultural, business and health programs and networks.	
Barbara Mackay-Cruise	For significant service to the community through major fundraising and coordination roles with a range of medical research organisations.	
Dr Kenneth Mackey	For significant service to rural and remote medicine through leadership roles of professional medical organisations, and to general practice.	
Ian Mackinnon	For significant service to primary industry, particularly to crop research and policy development, and to agricultural advisory committees.	
The late Stuart McWilliam	For significant service to the community of Griffith as a member, supporter and benefactor of a range of initiatives, and to winemaking.	
John Mant	For significant service to urban planning and public administration as an advisor and consultant to local and state governments.	
Dr Paul Mara	For significant service to medicine, particularly through the recruitment and retention of medical practitioners in rural and remote areas.	
Dr Neville Marchant	For significant service to conservation and the environment in Western Australia, to native plant taxonomy, and to research and education.	
Lynette Mayne	For significant service to business, particularly to the infrastructure construction and apparel sectors, through advisory roles, and to women.	
Sally Mays	For significant service to the performing arts as a leading solo pianist, accompanist and composer, to music education, and as an editor.	
Dr Nicholas Milton	For significant service to the arts, particularly to classical orchestral music performance, as a musician, conductor and artistic director.	
Dr John Moody	For significant service to clinical dentistry, particularly in remote Indigenous communities, and in the establishment of oral cancer treatment programs in India.	
The Honourable Norman Moore	For significant service to the Parliament of Western Australia through a range of portfolio responsibilities, to education, and to the community.	
Philip Moss	For significant service to public administration, particularly in the areas of law enforcement integrity, anti-corruption and human rights.	
Judith Neilson	For significant service to the arts through the museums and galleries sector, and as a benefactor of cultural and educational organisations.	
Emeritus Professor John Nevile	For significant service to tertiary education, particularly economics, as an academic and author, and to professional organisations.	
Genevieve Nihill	For significant service to the law, and to the community of Victoria, particularly to dispute resolution, human rights and disability services.	
Philippa Nikulinsky	For significant service to the visual arts as a botanical painter and illustrator, to professional associations, and as an author.	
Brian O'Connor	For significant service to the petroleum transport industry through emergency response safety training, and to the community of Yass.	
Dr William O'Reilly	For significant service to dentistry, particularly through leadership roles with professional associations, to education, and as a practitioner.	
Dr Sev Ozdowski OAM	For significant service to the community, particularly to human rights education, social justice and multiculturalism, and as an academic.	
Kelwin Pell	For significant service to sports administration, particularly in the Bendigo region, and to the development of youth sporting activities.	
Paula Penfold	For significant service to the community through support for people with Muscular Dystrophy, to child health ethical standards, and to medical research.	
Colin Peters	For significant service to the automotive manufacturing sector, to professional industry associations through advisory roles, and to lacrosse.	
Dr Oswald Petrucco RFD	For significant service to medicine and education in the field of obstetrics, human reproduction, and child health, and to professional groups.	
The Honourable Warren Pitt	For significant service to the Parliament of Queensland through a range of ministerial portfolio responsibilities, and to the community.	
Bruce Pollack	For significant service to the community in the areas of social welfare and public health.	
Robert Pontifex	For significant service to the community of South Australia, particularly through support for the arts.	
Moya Potts	For significant service to the Catholic Church and to the community as an advocate for women.	
Dr Peter Pratten	For significant service to medicine, particularly in the field of radiology as a practitioner, to education, and to professional bodies.	
Ian Pyman	For significant service to the community, particularly through leadership of education and health organisations, and to the law.	
Januario Rivas	For significant service to the Philippine community of the Northern Territory.	
Lionel Robberds QC	For significant service to the law, to rowing, and to the community.	
Dr Lyon Robinson	For significant service to medicine, particularly as a pioneer in the field of ophthalmic surgery.	
Michael Rose	For significant service to the Indigenous community through advocacy roles, and to the law.	
Barry Roycroft	For significant service to equestrian sports, as an administrator, coach and competitor.	
William Sanders	For significant service to Australian rules football, particularly as an administrator.	
Dr Richard Sawers	For significant service to dentistry as a clinician, educator, and to professional dental associations.	
Dr Rosie Scott	For significant service to literature as an author, and to human rights and inter-cultural understanding.	
Professor Ego Seeman	For significant service to medicine, as a researcher in the fields of osteoporosis and endocrinology, and as a clinician and academic.	
Dr Kerry Smith	For significant service to library and information sectors as an academic and researcher, and to professional organisations.	
Dr Brian Spain	For significant service to medicine in the discipline of anaesthesia, as a clinician, to healthcare standards, and to professional medical bodies.	
Heather Stacy	For significant service to primary industry, particularly as an administrator, and through the development of rural industries.	
Dr Bruce Standen	For significant service to primary industry, particularly to agricultural economics, sustainability, and research.	
Napau Stephen	For significant service to local government in the Torres Shire, and to the community through various advisory, social welfare and health organisations.	
Warren Stooke	For significant service to industrial relations, to the resources industry, and to the advancement of women.	
Kym Stuart	For significant service to nursing through a range of voluntary roles throughout the developing world, particularly in Asia and the Pacific.	
Diane Sullivan	For significant service to community health, particularly through aged care, Indigenous, and rural health organisations.	
Neil Summerson	For significant service to the finance, commerce and business sectors, to the arts, and to the community.	
Dr Roderic Sutherland	For significant service to medicine as a general practitioner, and to the community of Natimuk.	
John Tanner	For significant service to state and federal politics through the National Party of Australia, and to the community of Benalla.	
Joseph Tawadros	For significant service to music as an accomplished oud performer, composer and recording artist.	
Mark Thompson	For significant service to science as a satellite communications engineer through program management and design.	
Jennifer Treloar	For significant service to community health through support for primary medical and emergency services in rural and remote areas.	
Grahame Turk	For significant service to the seafood and fisheries industry through leadership roles, and to the development and sustainability of the sector.	
Mick Veivers	For significant service to sport, particularly rugby league, to the community of the Gold Coast, and to the Parliament of Queensland.	
Dr John Vorrath	For significant service to medicine as an otolaryngologist, and through the invention and development of specialist surgical instruments.	
John Vrodos	For significant service to the Greek community of the Northern Territory through a range of executive roles with sporting and cultural organisations.	
Associate Professor Bruce Walker	For significant service to the chiropractic and osteopathic professions through education and the development of professional organisations.	
Mike Walsh OAM	For significant service to the entertainment industry, and to the performing arts through support for young actors, theatre restoration and production.	
Valda Walsh	For significant service to the real estate industry, and to the community through support for a range of charitable organisations.	
Mary Waterford	For significant service to the community through social welfare organisations as an advocate for equity, human rights and social justice.	
Associate Professor David Watson	For significant service to medicine, and to medical education, to professional organisations, and to the community.	
Associate Professor Julian White	For significant service to medicine, particularly in the field of toxinology, through clinical and leadership roles, and to professional groups.	
Lisa Wilkinson	For significant service to the print and broadcast media as a journalist and presenter, and to a range of youth and women's health groups.	
Reg Williams RFD	For significant service to youth through Scouting at the local and national level, to historical organisations, and to the community.	
Geoffrey Willis	For significant service to business, and to the community of Tasmania, particularly in the planning, energy and water supply sectors.	
John Winning	For significant service to the community through fundraising and support for charitable organisations, and to sailing and horse sports.	
The Reverend Canon Graeme Winterton	For significant service to the community through disaster recovery and emergency support ministry, and to the Anglican Church of Australia.	
Associate Professor Michael Woodward	For significant service to medicine, particularly aged care, geriatric medical research, and Alzheimer's disease, as an author, and to professional groups.	
The Honourable Trish Worth	For significant service to community health through drug and alcohol prevention organisations, and to the Parliament of Australia.	
Dr John Wright	For significant service to science and engineering, particularly to renewable energy technology, and to professional organisations.	
Ferial Zekiman	For significant service to primary industry, and to business, particularly in the dairy sector through artisan cheesemaking.	

==== Military Division ====
Branch	Recipient	Citation
Navy	Rear Admiral Anthony Carl Dalton, CSM, RAN	For exceptional service in the field of helicopter acquisition and sustainment in the Australian Defence Force.
Navy	Rear Admiral Gregory John Sammut, CSC, RAN	For exceptional performance as the Head Future Submarine Program, the Director General Submarine Capability and the Director Submarine and Specialist Ship.
Navy	Commodore Brett Stephen Wolski, RAN	For distinguished service as Director General Workforce Planning Branch, Defence People Group, and as Director Workforce Modelling Forecasting and Analysis, Defence People Strategy and Policy Group.
Army	Colonel Ashley Warren Gunder	For exceptional service as the Commander Combat Training Centre and Senior Staff Officer Headquarters 1st Division during the period 2009 to 2015.
Air Force	Group Captain Stephen Victor Edgeley	For exceptional service in the field of Joint Battlefield Airspace Control for the Australian Defence Force.
Air Force	Air Commodore Stephen Leslie Meredith	For exceptional service to the Royal Australian Air Force in capability sustainment.
Air Force	Group Captain Sandra Patricia Riley	For exceptional service to the Australian Defence Force through her contribution to the development and deployment of the aeromedical evacuation capability.
Air Force	Air Vice Marshal Gavin Alexander Turnbull	For exceptional service to the Australian Defence Force in air combat capability development and support to military operations.
Air Force	Air Commodore Peter Craig Yates, CSC	For exceptional service in technical maintenance reform and logistics management.

=== Medal of the Order of Australia (OAM) ===
==== General Division ====
Recipient	Citation	Notes
Diana Abdel-Rahman	For service to the community through a range of multicultural organisations.	
Barry James Aitchison	For service to the community of the Monaro.	
Cemal Akdeniz	For service to the Turkish community in Victoria.	
Susan Bartlett Alexander	For service to the community, particularly to children's welfare.	
Douglas Bevan Ambrose	For service to primary education in Queensland.	
Elsia May Archer	For service to local government, and to the community of the West Kimberley.	
Helen (Betty) Argent	For service to the Indigenous community of South Australia.	
Eric Garnet Arthur	For service to the community of Mount Gambier.	
Raymond Richard Ashford	For service to the tourism industry in South-East Queensland.	
Lawrence Joseph Atley	For service to the community, particularly through Rotary.	
Jan Maree Ball	For service to the community through support to serving defence members.	
Vincent Martin Ball	For service to the performing arts.	
Jennifer Patricia Banks	For service to sport, and to people with a disability.	
John Charles Barlow RFD	For service to the community of Lithgow.	
Barbara May Barry	For service to children through charitable organisations.	
Maxwell Robert Barton	For service to seniors, and to the community.	
Lady (Joyce Elizabeth) Beatie	For service to lawn bowls, and to people with disabilities.	
Denise Begg	For service to youth through the Scouting movement.	
Andrew Pierce Bell	For service to the community of the Gold Coast.	
Bruce Herbert Bell	For service to the community of Botany Bay, and to marine rescue.	
Mary Bell	For service to athletics.	
Edward Alfred (Eddie Storm) Bellamy	For service to the performing arts.	
Frank Morris Benjamin	For service to the merino sheep industry in Queensland.	
Eddy Hyacinthus Bergsma	For service to surf lifesaving.	
John Albert Berry	For service to the community, and to fire prevention.	
Dr Graeme Leslie Bertuch	For service to medicine, and to the community.	
Basil Best	For service to the community, and to veterans.	
Colin Russell Bevan	For service to crime prevention education, and to the community.	
Peter Terence Blackmore	For service to local government, and to the community of Maitland.	
Margaret Blakers	For service to conservation and the environment.	
Leonard Benjamin Bogatin	For service to athletics.	
Patricia Alice Boggs	For service to the arts through administrative roles.	
Dr Stanley Philip Bolton †	For service to the chiropractic profession, and to the community.	
Mignon Elizabeth Bonwick	For service to homeless youth in Sydney.	
Darrel John Bourke	For service to children with a disability.	
Thomas John Braes	For service to the community, and to the law.	
Arthur David Brawn	For service to the community, particularly through Rotary.	
Kathleen Ellen Bright	For service to women, and to nursing.	
Mark Andrew Brimble	For service to the community through the promotion of safety for cruise line passengers.	
Beverley Brock	For service to the community through charitable organisations.	
Alan Dean Brook	For service to youth, and to the community.	
Barbara Lyn Brook	For service to youth, and to the community.	
Anthony Ashley Brooker	For service to secondary education, and to the community.	
John Ruthven Buchanan	For service to jazz music, and to the broadcast media.	
John Houston Buzaglo	For service to sailing as a yachtsman and instructor.	
Yvonne Caddy	For service to local government in South Australia, and to the community.	
Graham William Caldersmith	For service to musical instrument making.	
Allan James Cameron BEM	For service to surf lifesaving.	
Dr Jane Mayo Carolan	For service to the community as an historian, archivist and author.	
Nola Mary Cecins	For service to medicine, particularly in the field of pulmonary rehabilitation.	
Maxine May Chalinor	For service to the community through eisteddfods.	
Pastor Raymond Arthur Chapman	For service to the Anglican Church of Australia, and to veterans welfare.	
Errol John Chinner	For service to the community of Port Adelaide.	
Shu-Nam Samuel Chu	For service to the community through a range of organisations.	
Janet Clifford	For service to women, and to the community.	
Patricia Mary Coffey	For service to the communities of Shepparton and Seymour.	
Professor John Rowland Cole	For service to the environment, to higher education, and to the community.	
Rodney William Collins APM	For service to children through charitable organisations.	
Robert Cook	For service to heritage preservation, and to the community of Newcastle.	
Robyn Margaret Cotterell-Jones	For service to the community through support for victims of crime.	
Joan Aylwin Coulton	For service to the community of Lake Macquarie.	
John Richard Coventry	For service to local government, and to the community.	
John Crook	For service to veterans and their families.	
John Edward Cunningham	For service to medicine, and to the promotion of immunisation.	
Laurence Keith Cunningham	For service to Australia-Thailand relations.	
Graeme James Curnow	For service to the community through the Men's Shed movement.	
Christine Gay Curry	For service to conservation and the environment.	
Helen Margaret Curtis†	For service to wetland conservation and urban landcare.	
Judith May Cutler	For service to the community through voluntary roles.	
Lynne Dalton	For service to volunteering in New South Wales.	
Teresa D'Amelio	For service to the community, particularly to women with breast cancer.	
Robert Miles Dare	For service to the community of Eildon, and to youth.	
Geoffrey Victor Day	For service to the community through a range of charitable organisations.	
Dr Leah Adele Day	For service to community history.	
Steven Victor De Kruijff	For service to the mining industry, and to the community.	
Professor James William Denham	For service to medicine, and to medical research.	
Chantal Marie-Claudine Denis	For service to the community through the Wayside Chapel.	
Margaret Helena Desmyth	For service to the community of Brighton.	
John Oswald Dinham	For service to the community of Port Lincoln.	
John William Diprose	For service to the community, and to the Uniting Church in Australia.	
Daryl John Dobson	For service to the community of Pambula.	
Dean Charles Dolling	For service to local government, and to the community of Port Broughton.	
Barbara Jean Dorward	For service to the community, and to the Uniting Church in Australia.	
Noel Edmund Dowse	For service to youth, and to the community.	
Nola Margaret Dudley	For service to the community of Euroa.	
James Marshall Duggan	For service to the community of Bairnsdale.	
Francis Bernard Dullard	For service to the community through a range of organisations.	
Winifred Mary Dunnachie	For service to the community, and to the Uniting Church in Australia.	
David George Dwyer	For service to the welfare of naval veterans and their families.	
Charles William Eason†	For service to the Clubs industry, and to lawn bowls.	
Stephen Charles Eaton	For service to veterans and their families.	
Billie Albert Ebert	For service to the community of Loxton.	
Kenneth Ronald Edwards	For service to the community of Wynnum Manly.	
Stathis E Efstathis	For service to the Greek community of Queensland.	
Stephen Noel Elder	For service to the Catholic Church in Australia, and to the community of Victoria.	
Russell Henry Elliott	For service to tertiary education as an administrator.	
Milton (Snow) Fairclough	For service to veterans, and to the community.	
Edith Marjorie Fairlie	For service to aged care.	
Dr Jennifer Lorraine Farnden	For service to people with an acquired brain injury, and their families.	
John Wayne Farragher	For service to rugby league, and to the community of Penrith.	
Thomas Walter Fawcett	For service to the livestock transport industry.	
Allan Daniel Fazldeen	For service to early childhood care and other community organisations.	
Dr Howard James Fearn-Wannan	For service to social welfare organisations, and to the Baptist Union of Victoria.	
Edward Howard Fenton	For service to veterans and their families.	
Lynne Mary Foley	For service to technical and further education in Queensland.	
Megan Finlay Fookes	For service to people living with rare diseases.	
Keith Duncan Ford	For service to music through brass bands.	
Roy Mervyn Fox	For service to the community of Alexandra.	
Andrew Johns Fraser	For service to the footwear retailing industry, and to the community.	
Beverley Joan Fraser	For service to the community through Lions International.	
Norman Harold Furness	For service to veterans and their families.	
Dianne Gaddin	For service to mental health through a range of support organisations.	
Associate Professor Donald Stuart Garden	For service to community history and heritage preservation organisations.	
Edward Joseph Gardiner	For service to the community of Gisborne.	
Michael Peter Gardiner	For service to the community of Gisborne.	
Colin Gelling	For service to the community of Berrima.	
Andrew James Gibson	For service to surf lifesaving.	
Kevin Thomas Giles	For service to the community of New South Wales.	
Ross Lincoln Gilmour	For service to the community through chaplaincy roles.	
Dr Stephen Giugni	For service to the communications industry through research, and to volleyball.	
Richard John Glover	For service to charitable organisations, and to the community.	
Donald Arthur Goldsworthy	For service to architecture and urban design.	
Ian Albert Goode	For service to surf lifesaving.	
Neville Wayne Goodwin	For service to local government, and to the community of the Bass Coast.	
Sister Jane Frances Gorey	For service to health care support organisations.	
Alistair Robert Gow	For service to the funeral industry, and to the community of Ashgrove-The Gap.	
Dr Peter Bert Greenberg	For service to medicine, and to population health.	
Mark John Greenhill	For service to local government, and to the community of the Blue Mountains.	
Geoffrey Ivan Grenfell	For service to the community of the Central Coast, and to youth.	
Margaret Lillian Griffiths	For service to music education.	
Carmina (Carmel) Guerra	For service to multicultural youth in Victoria.	
Lt Col Ian MacKenzie Guild MBE (Retired)	For service to veterans and their families.	
Gregory Norman Hammond	For service to the community through a range of volunteer roles.	
Graeme William Hanger	For service to the community of Bathurst.	
Dr Anthony Peter Harrington	For service to medicine, and to the community of the Sunshine Coast.	
William George Harrison	For service to the community of Bathurst, and to education.	
Maureen Patricia Hartung	For service to education, and to the community of the Australian Capital Territory.	
James Albert Haynes	For service to the performing arts as an entertainer, author, broadcaster and historian.	
Ronald Hedger	For service to the community of Alexandra.	
Margaret Theresa Heiliger†	For service to the community of Tamworth.	
Brother Francis Thomas Hennessy	For service to education, and to people who are deaf, or hard of hearing.	
Keith Fredrick Henning	For service to the community of Parramatta, and through charitable contributions.	
Susie Elisabeth Herzberg	For service to conservation and the environment.	
Kevin John Hillier	For service to music through military and brass bands.	
Geoffrey Nelson Hindmarsh	For service to the community of Newcastle.	
Brian Kenneth Hoare	For service to the community, and to the manufacturing sector.	
Sylvia Hochuli	For service to the Swiss community of Victoria.	
Christopher John Holden	For service to community of Penrith.	
Herbert John Holds	For service to rural pharmacy, and to the community of South Australia.	
Paul Cameron Holley	For service to choral music, particularly in Queensland.	
Beryl Joan Holmes	For service to women, and to the community.	
Dr Ronald Frederick Holt	For service to tertiary education, particularly in foreign languages.	
Steven James Hood	For service to rugby league.	
Alma Ing	For service to the community of Bundaberg.	
Wendy Ireland	For service to public administration in Western Australia, and to the community.	
Marilyn Diana Iverson	For service to children with cancer, and to their families.	
Peter Charles Iverson	For service to children with cancer, and to their families.	
Craig Harry James	For service to rowing, and to sport in Western Australia.	
Mary Elizabeth Jamison	For service to music, and to the community of Coffs Harbour.	
Joy Elaine Jarman	For service to people with a disability in Victoria.	
Murray Walter Jarvis	For service to the community of the Bega Valley.	
Maxwell Lloyd Jelbart	For service to the dairy industry, and to the community.	
Dr Susan Carol Jenkins	For service to medicine, particularly in the field of pulmonary rehabilitation.	
Christine Willis Jensen	For service to the Anglican Church community in Sydney.	
Andrew Fredrick Johnson	For service to the community of Tathra.	
Fred Johnson	For service to athletics in Queensland.	
Samuel Joseph Johnson	For service to cancer research support organisations, and to the performing arts.	
Sandra Ruth Johnson	For service to the mining industry in the Northern Territory.	
Kenneth Charles Jolley	For service to the community of the far north coast of New South Wales.	
Donald Jones	For service to veterans and their families.	
Peter Adderley Kearney	For service to local government, to education, and to the community of West Tamar.	
Michael Keats	For service to bushwalking, and as an author.	
Brother Sean Michael Keefe	For service to the community of Manningham, and to the people of Timor Leste.	
Noel Kendall	For service to the finance and credit union sectors, and to the community.	
Darryn Michael Keneally	For service to youth in South Australia.	
Gerald William Keuneman	For service to music, and to the community.	
Judith Kilby	For service to equestrian sports as a coach and administrator.	
John Maxwell Killey	For service to the community of Chester Hill.	
Heather Jean King	For service to veterans and their families, and to the community.	
Ivan John King	For service to the performing arts as an historian and archivist.	
Dr Sajeev Koshy	For service to dentistry in Victoria.	
Gerald Nicholas Kostos	For service to the community through a range of sporting organisations.	
June Florence Lawrence	For service to veterans and their families.	
Reginald Edward Lawrence	For service to veterans and their families.	
Marie Emma Lenon†	For service to floral art.	
Dorothea Adelheit Lesnicki	For service to the Polish community of South Australia.	
Phyllis Gwenellian Lloyd	For service to the community of Napoleons.	
Trevor Lloyd	For service to the community of the Blue Mountains.	
John Richard Lough	For service to children through cancer support organisations.	
Jennifer Anne Loughman	For service to people with Cystic Fibrosis, and their families.	
June Pauline Lowry	For service to the community of Wakool.	
Hung Ly	For service to the Chinese community of Western Sydney.	
Geoffrey Raymond Lyons	For service to local government, to the community of West Tamar, and to surf lifesaving.	
Patricia Joy McCabe	For service to veterans and their families.	
John Maccarone	For service to engineering.	
Daryl Hedley McClure†	For service to the community of Bendigo.	
Dr Maureen Ann McCluskey	For service to medicine and to aged care.	
Brian Peter McConnell	For service to the community through drug and alcohol support services.	
Brian William McCormack	For service to local government, and to the community of the Upper Lachlan Shire.	
Colleen Mary McCormack	For service to the community of Tasmania.	
Kevin Charles McDonald	For service to motorsport.	
Robert John McDonald	For service to local government, and to the beef cattle industry.	
Raymond John McDonough	For service to veterans and their families, and to the community.	
Graeme Lachlan McEwin	For service to the community of Rowville.	
Dr Brian Campbell McFarlane	For service to the arts as a teacher, film critic, reviewer and author.	
Annette McGeachy	For service to conservation and the environment, particularly to botanic gardens.	
Elizabeth Barbara McGilvray	For service to the community, particularly as an interpreter and translator.	
Malcolm Austin Macgregor	For service to lawn bowls, and to the community.	
Alex Robert McKenzie	For service to lifesaving as an administrator.	
Sharyn Therese Mackenzie	For service to the community through refugee support organisations.	
Catherine McMahon	For service to community health, particularly through traumatic stress services for journalists.	
Thomas Ignatious McMullen	For service to cancer patients and their families.	
Raibeart Wallace Macneish	For service to the visual arts, and to the community of Warrandyte.	
George Albert McPherson	For service to disabled winter sports, and to the community of Myrtleford.	
Valerie Margaret McPherson	For service to the community of Myrtleford.	
Dr Creston Ivan Magasdi	For service to local government, and to the community.	
Howard Russell Maher	For service to the veteran community of Tweed Heads.	
Peter Frederick Maher	For service to the community of Longford through a range of sporting and service organisations.	
Ian Boyd Maitland	For service to cultural heritage and civil engineering	
Zanne Jappe Mallett	For service to the Scandinavian community, and to multicultural media.	
Dr Warren Frederick Marks	For service to education.	
Narelle Gai Martin	For service to nursing, particularly palliative care for children.	
Robert David Mattingly	For service to the advertising industry, and to the community.	
Charles Leslie May AFSM	For service to the community of Nundle.	
Gregory Mark Miles	For service to horse racing as a radio and television caller and presenter.	
Malcolm James Milne	For service to snow skiing.	
Sumalee Anne Milne	For service to the international community through initiatives in South East Asia.	
Paul Louis Mitchell	For service to civil engineering.	
Anthony Craig Monley	For service to the community through a range of organisations.	
Steven James Moon	For service to marine environment preservation.	
Michael John Morland	For service to local government, and to the community.	
Henry Frederick Morris	For service to rugby league.	
Philip Bruce Mosgrove	For service to the community of Newcastle.	
Michael Phillip Mullins	For service to the performing arts.	
Adrian Rodney Newstead	For service to the museum and galleries sector, particularly through the promotion of Indigenous arts.	
Thanh Van Nguyen	For service to the Vietnamese community of New South Wales.	
Brian Cameron Niven	For service to the pipe band movement, and to the community.	
Murray Davidson Nixon	For service to the Parliament, to the agricultural sector, and to the community, of Western Australia.	
Peter Bruce Noble	For service to live and recorded music, to tourism, and to the community.	
Spiro John Notaras†	For service to the community of Grafton.	
Raymond Charles Nye	For service to the community of Barooga.	
Terence Edward Oakes-Ash	For service to the community, and to commerce.	
Brendan Patrick O'Connell	For service to the community through a range of organisations.	
Desmond John O'Meara ESM	For service to veterans and their families, and to the community of Yarrawonga-Mulwala.	
Chong Ken Ong	For service to local government, and to the Chinese community of Victoria.	
Eugene Oliver O'Rourke	For service to the community, particularly through multicultural media.	
Robert Gilmour Orr	For service to the community of the Shire of Hepburn.	
Anne Patricia Oughtibridge	For service to the community of Victoria through Probus.	
Dr John Houston Paradice	For service to the community, particularly as a general practitioner.	
Paul Dudley Parkinson	For service to youth through Scouting.	
Stephen John Pascoe	For service to cricket.	
Ross Peter Patching	For service to the community through social welfare initiatives, and to the sport of pistol shooting.	
Dr Thakorbhai Babubhai Patel	For service to the community through a range of volunteer roles.	
Janet Paterson	For service to the community through social welfare advocacy and support.	
Joan Laurel Patterson	For service to the community through a range of organisations.	
David Lister Pratt	For service to the community of Ballarat.	
Paul James Prendergast	For service to youth.	
Margaret Frances Pullen	For service to the community of Wangaratta.	
Robert William Purtle	For service to the community of Yarrawonga-Mulwala.	
Professor Kathryn Margaret Refshauge	For service to physiotherapy, and to medical education.	
David John Reid	For service to orchestral and choral music in South Australia.	
Mervyn Reid	For service to veterans and their families.	
Michael Charles Reid	For service to the visual arts.	
William Keith Rendell	For service to the community, particularly through Rotary.	
Margaret Anne Richards	For service to the visual arts, and to the community of Benalla.	
Joycelyn Beatrice Rieck	For service to aged persons, and to the Uniting Church in Australia.	
Russell George Ritter	For service to equestrian sports.	
David Vernon Roberts	For service to children through support organisations.	
Phyllis Ann Robilotta-Gleniser	For service to aged care, and to the community.	
Clifford Farrington Robinson	For service to aviation history, and to the community.	
Brian Stewart Roe	For service to sport, particularly athletics.	
Patrick Rogan †	For service to the community of New South Wales.	
Harvey Maxwell Rose †	For service to local government, and to the community.	
Ronald James Royston	For service to football, particularly in Sydney's inner west.	
Victor Ivan Rudewych	For service to the Ukrainian community of Victoria.	
James Kenneth Russell	For service to engineering, and to the community.	
Colin John Ryan	For service to the community of Gulargambone.	
Dean Raymond Ryan	For service to veterans and their families.	
Dorothy Alice Ryan	For service to children through charitable organisations.	
George Travers Sadleir RFD	For service to the law, and to the judiciary in Western Australia.	
Robert Sampson	For service to railway heritage preservation.	
Gregory Winston Samson	For service to youth through Scouting, and to the community.	
John Chester Sandland	For service to local government, and to the community of Peterborough.	
Allan John Sauer	For service to the Anglican Church of Australia.	
Monica Lorraine Saville	For service to the community, particularly through Rotary.	
Graeme Neil Scannell	For service to cricket in Victoria.	
Reverend Father Carmelo John Sciberras	For service to the Catholic Church in Australia, and to the Maltese community of New South Wales.	
John James Sealey AFSM	For service to the community, particularly through a range of veterans welfare groups.	
Eugene Seeto	For service to the Chinese community of Sydney.	
Dr Jeffrey Shapiro	For service to medicine as a general practitioner, and to the community.	
Adjunct Associate Professor Rashmi Sharma	For service to medicine, and to professional organisations.	
Janet Lorraine Sharp	For service to people with a disability.	
John Seymour Shaw	For service to local government, and to the community.	
John Alfred Shute †	For service to the blind and those with low vision.	
Geoffrey Simpson	For service to the community, and to the Uniting Church in Australia.	
Dr Ronald Gordon Sinclair	For service to environmental biosecurity management, and to people with Alzheimer's.	
Pastor Linda Elizabeth Sivyer	For service to local government, and to the community of Aurukun.	
Dianne Estelle Skaines	For service to the community of the Central Coast of New South Wales.	
Dr George Bertram Skeene	For service to the Indigenous community of North Queensland.	
Robert Carl Sleigh	For service to the community of South Australia.	
Tamara Anne Sloper Harding	For service to the communities of Timor Leste and Pittwater.	
Ellen Alice Smiddy	For service to children and the community through social welfare organisations.	
Garry Kenneth Smith	For service to the marine community as a rescue volunteer.	
Kevin Gordon Smith	For service to netball.	
Marie Evelyn Smith	For service to equestrian sports, and to the community.	
Peter William Solomon	For service to local government, and to the community of Port Augusta.	
Jean Elsie Sorley	For service to local government, and to the community of the Western Downs.	
Ailsa Margaret Stacy	For service to the community through music.	
Norman Keith Standing ED	For service to the community, particularly as a cancer support fundraiser.	
Dr Rodney Milton Starr	For service to veterinary science, to professional organisations, and to the community.	
Pauline Stewart	For service to the communities of Colac and Geelong.	
Carolyn Stubbs	For service to the community through fundraising roles.	
Stanley Peter Sutas	For service to the Lithuanian community of Geelong.	
Richard Tann	For service to the community through support for charitable organisations.	
Wallace John Taylor	For service to the information technology sector, and to rural development.	
Allan Wayne Thompson	For service to the communities of the Hunter and the Central Coast.	
Robin Dorothy Thompson	For service to music, and to the community of Orange.	
Roger Lewis Thompson	For service to the community of Hamilton, and to the Uniting Church in Australia.	
Janet Charlotte Thomson	For service to the Royal Botanic Gardens, Melbourne through a range of roles.	
Norma Lillian Thorburn	For service to the community of St Marys.	
Marjorie Olive Thornton	For service to the community of Port Elliot.	
Dr Michael Leo Tierney	For service to rugby league, and to dairy and beef cattle production.	
Leslie Robert Tod	For service to the preservation and conservation of heritage theatres.	
Alan Ronald Tough	For service to sailing, and to the community.	
Arthur Chrisus Tow	For service to the community through volunteering roles.	
Warren John Tozer	For service to the community of Grafton.	
June Helen Treadwell	For service to education, to Vision Australia, and to the Anglican Church of Australia.	
Robert John Tremain	For service to local government, and to the community of Warialda.	
James William Trevaskis	For service to the community of Geraldton.	
Joan Helen Treweeke	For service to rural and remote communities in New South Wales.	
David Ernest Trist	For service to the community through a range of organisations.	
Dr Keith Ernest Tronc	For service to the legal profession, and to education.	
Dr John Brodribb Tucker	For service to medicine, particularly anaesthetics, to the blueberry industry, and to the community.	
Leo Edward Tutt	For service to business, and to the community through contributions to charitable organisations.	
Albert Anthony Vella	For service to multicultural education.	
Kristina Maree Vesk	For service to animal welfare organisations.	
Major Jacqueline Vincent	For service to youth through the Australian Army Cadets.	
Andrew Mitchell Vlahov	For service to basketball as an athlete and administrator.	
Bernard Kennedy Walker	For service to shearing, and to the community of Euroa.	
Voila Joy Walker	For service to education, and to the community.	
Peter Walton	For service to youth through Scouting, to student exchange programs, and to education.	
Norman Robert Warburton	For service to veterans, and to the community.	
Peter John Ward	For service to cross country skiing.	
Sister Teresa Anne Ward	For service to Indigenous communities in the Northern Territory, particularly as a linguist and educator.	
Donald James Waters	For service to the community through charitable organisations, and to the visual arts.	
Rodney Athol Watson	For service to netball through administrative roles.	
Dr Shirley Marie Watt †	For service to tertiary education, and to the community.	
Dr Richard Colin Waugh	For service to radiology as a practitioner and educator.	
Dr Edward William Weaver	For service to medicine, and to medical education.	
Joy Welch	For service to the Anglican Church of Australia, and to the community.	
Jillian Ruth Wells	For service to medical research and community organisations.	
Neville Brice Wells	For service to conservation and the environment, particularly ornithology.	
Gib Wettenhall	For service to conservation and the environment.	
Patricia Kathleen Wetton	For service to people with a disability, and to the community.	
Michael Geoffrey Wheal	For service to the community, particularly as an educator.	
Vernon Wheatley	For service to the automotive industry.	
Dr Michael Duckett White QC	For service to maritime law, and to naval history.	
Robert John Whitehead	For service to the community, particularly in Ballarat.	
Carole Christine Whitelock	For service to charitable organisations.	
Dr Paul Raymond Whiting	For service to the community through choral music.	
Barry Charles Wilde	For service to the Parliament of New South Wales, and to the community of Parramatta.	
Raymond John Wiles	For service to the community through a range of organisations.	
Geoffrey Howard Williams	For service to Australian rules football, and to the community of Geelong.	
Judith Margaret Williams	For service to local government, and to the community of Yass.	
Elizabeth Leigh Wilson	For service to the community, particularly through Toastmasters International.	
Raymond John Winter	For service to veterans and their families, and to the community.	
Douglas Wintin	For service to rugby league.	
Paul Joseph Wise	For service to mapping, and to history.	
Arthur James Withers	For service to the community of Flinders Island.	
Garnet Alfred Wood	For service to community health.	
Robert James Wood	For service to veterans and their families.	
Joy Woodhouse	For service to the community through volunteering organisations.	
Laurel Kathleen Wray	For service to conservation and the environment through a range of volunteer roles.	
Maureen Annette Wright	For service to cartography, and to the community.	
Donald Keith Young	For service to veterans and their families.	

==== Military Division ====
Branch	Recipient	Citation
Navy	Warrant Officer Rachelle Lee Burnett	For meritorious performance of duty as the Naval Police Coxswain in ARDENT FOUR and HMAS Toowoomba during the period 2009 to 2014.
Navy	Warrant Officer Stuart Ronald O'Brien	For meritorious service as a Maritime Logistics Personnel Sailor in the field of personnel services and as the founder of the Defence Gay and Lesbian Information Service.
Navy	Chief Petty Officer Jay Barrett Stevenson	For meritorious service as a Senior Sailor in the field of Personnel Management and Support.
Navy	Warrant Officer Nigel Mark Williams, CSM	For meritorious service as a Chief Petty Officer Bosun in the Royal Australian Navy.
Army	Warrant Officer Class One Craig Douglas Egan	For meritorious service as the Regimental Sergeant Major of Headquarters 4th Brigade, Corps of Royal Australian Engineers, Combined Arms Training Centre and the 1st Division/Deployable Joint Force Headquarters during the period January 2010 to June 2015.
Army	Warrant Officer Class One Anthony Maxwell Hortile	For meritorious service as the Regimental Sergeant Major of the 16th Air Land Regiment and the School of Artillery.
Army	Warrant Officer Class One Michael Desmond Landy	For meritorious service as the Regimental Sergeant Major of the 31st/42nd Battalion, the Royal Queensland Regiment and the 7th Battalion, the Royal Australian Regiment.
Army	Warrant Officer Class One Peter Edwin Russell	For meritorious service as the Senior Cargo Specialist of Maritime Wing, Army School of Transport and Headquarters 17th Combat Service Support Brigade, and Operations Warrant Officer of 10th Force Support Battalion.
Army	Warrant Officer Class One Peter Zajac, CSC	For meritorious performance of duties as Regimental Sergeant Major of the Defence Command Support Training Centre and Ceremonial - Army
Air Force	Warrant Officer Cameron John Lawrence	For meritorious performance of duty as an Aircraft Technician in the Royal Australian Air Force.

== Meritorious Service ==
=== Public Service Medal (PSM) ===
Public Service Medal ribbon

Recipient	Citation
Dr Simon Andrew Barter	For outstanding public service to aircraft accident investigation and safety, in particular the area of metal fatigue in military aircraft, and the development of differentially corrected GPS based debris mapping.

=== Australian Police Medal (APM) ===
Australian Police Medal ribbon

Branch	Recipient
Australian Federal Police	Commander Brian Samuel McDonald
Australian Federal Police	Commander Paul Sheldon Osborne

=== Australian Fire Service Medal (AFSM) ===
Australian Fire Service Medal ribbon

Branch	Recipient
Federal	David Charles Brooks

=== Ambulance Service Medal (ASM) ===
Ambulance Service Medal ribbon

Branch	Recipient
New South Wales Ambulance Services	Brian Joseph Parsell

=== Emergency Services Medal (ESM) ===
Emergency Services Medal ribbon

Branch	Recipient
New South Wales Emergency Services	Peter Cinque, OAM
New South Wales Emergency Services	Graham Kingston Kinder
New South Wales Emergency Services	Mark Anthony Powderly
Victorian Emergency Services	Kevin Charles Poile
Queensland Emergency Services	Andrew Gordon Bickerton
Queensland Emergency Services	George Allen Hill
Western Australian Emergency Services	Geoff Bernard Brierley
Western Australian Emergency Services	Robert William Crawford
Western Australian Emergency Services	Kenneth McLeod
South Australian Emergency Services	James Trevlyn Smith
Tasmanian Emergency Services	John Leonard Campbell
Tasmanian Emergency Services	Peter John Geard, OAM
Tasmanian Emergency Services	Kelvin Douglas Jones
Northern Territory Emergency Services	Sharon Louise Kearney

== Distinguished Service ==
=== Second Bar to the Distinguished Service Cross (DSC and 2 Bars) ===
Branch	Recipient	Citation
Army	Lieutenant Colonel I,	For distinguished leadership in warlike operations as part of a Special Operations Force on Operation OKRA from September 2014 to February 2015.

=== Bar to the Distinguished Service Cross (DSC and Bar) ===
Distinguished Service Cross & Bar ribbon

Branch	Recipient	Citation
Army	Brigadier D, DSC	For distinguished command and leadership in warlike operations on Operation SLIPPER

=== Distinguished Service Cross (DSC) ===
Distinguished Service Cross ribbon

Branch	Recipient	Citation
Army	Major General Craig William Orme, AM, CSC	For distinguished command and leadership in warlike operations as Commander Joint Task Force 633 on Operations SLIPPER and OKRA from September 2013 to December 2014.
Air Force	Air Commodore Steven Peter Roberton, AM	For distinguished command and leadership in warlike operations as the inaugural Commander Air Task Group 630 on Operation OKRA from September 2014 until January 2015.

=== Distinguished Service Medal (DSM) ===
Distinguished Service Medal ribbon

Branch	Recipient	Citation
Army	Lieutenant Colonel Sean Edward Benpoath	For distinguished leadership in warlike operations whilst deployed on Operations SLIPPER and HIGHROAD as the inaugural Commanding Officer Mentor to the 2nd Training Kandak, Afghan National Army Officer Academy from 14 January 2014 to 8 February 2015.
Army	Captain K	For distinguished leadership in warlike operations as the Nursing Officer and Health Planner on Operation OKRA.
Air Force	Squadron Leader M	For distinguished leadership in warlike operations in tactical planning and operational risk management on Operation OKRA.

=== Commendation for Distinguished Service ===
Commendation for Distinguished Service ribbon

Branch	Recipient	Citation
Navy	Captain Craig Anthony Powell, RAN	For distinguished performance of duties in warlike operations as the Director of Operations, Combined Maritime Forces, Maritime Operations Advisor, Joint Task Force 633 on Operation SLIPPER from 3 December 2013 to 30 June 2014.
Army	Brigadier Andrew William Freeman	For distinguished performance of duties in warlike operations as the Combined Joint Staff Officer Logistics within North Atlantic Treaty Organization Special Operations Component Command-Afghanistan from 11 January 2014 to 10 December 2014.
Army	Major Danielle Nicole Huggins	For distinguished performance of duties in warlike operations while deployed on Operation SLIPPER as the Female TOLAY platoon commander to the United Kingdom-led mentoring mission to the Afghan National Army Officer Academy at Qargha, Kabul, Afghanistan from February to September 2014.
Army	Captain Katrina Anne Kelly	For distinguished performance of duties in warlike operations as the Nursing Officer to the United Kingdom-led mentoring mission to the Afghan National Army Officer Academy at Qargha, Kabul Afghanistan on Operations SLIPPER and HIGHROAD from July 2014 to January 2015.
Army	Colonel M	For distinguished performance of duties on Operation SLIPPER.
Army	Major R	For distinguished performance of duties in warlike operations while deployed as the Executive Officer and Officer Commanding on Operation OKRA.
Army	Corporal S	For distinguished performance of duties in warlike operations while deployed as a Team Commander on Operation OKRA.
Army	Brigadier David Peter Shields	For distinguished performance of duties in warlike operations while deployed on Operation SLIPPER from 14 November 2013 to 15 November 2014.
Army	Major T	For distinguished performance of duties in warlike operations while deployed as an Officer Commanding, Commando Company Group with the Special Operations Task Group Force on Rotation I on Operation OKRA.
Air Force	Flight Lieutenant C	For distinguished performance of duties in warlike operations while deployed as a Combat Controller on Operation OKRA.
Air Force	Air Commodore Noel Gregory Derwort, CSC	For distinguished performance of duties in warlike operations as the Deputy Commander Joint Task Force 633 on Operation SLIPPER.
Air Force	Air Commodore Hayden Kelsey Marshall	For distinguished performance of duties in warlike operations as the Deputy Commander Support Headquarters Joint Task Force 633 on Operation SLIPPER from October 2013 to November 2014.
Air Force	Group Captain R	For distinguished performance of duties in warlike operations during Operation OKRA.

=== Conspicuous Service Cross (CSC) ===
Conspicuous Service Cross ribbon

Branch	Recipient	Citation
Navy	Lieutenant Commander John David De Bomford, RAN	For outstanding devotion to duty as the Marine Engineering Officer in HMAS Stuart from December 2013 to March 2015.
Navy	Chief Petty Officer S	For outstanding achievement in the Australian Defence Force Counter Improvised Device Task Force.
Navy	Commander David Murray Walter, RAN	For outstanding achievement as the Commander Engineer in HMAS Canberra.
Navy	Captain Bradley Ian White, RAN	For outstanding achievement in the performance of duty as the Director of the Navy People Career Management Agency.
Army	Major B	For outstanding achievement in the performance of duty during Operation Bring Them Home in August 2014.
Army	Lieutenant Colonel Robert Geoffery Brennan	For outstanding achievement as the Commanding Officer of the 9th Battalion, the Royal Queensland Regiment and inaugural Commanding Officer of the 11th/13th Brigade Reinforcing Battle Group.
Army	Lieutenant Colonel David Mark Edwards	For outstanding achievement as the Commanding Officer of the School of Artillery.
Army	Lieutenant Colonel Gavin Michael Keating	For outstanding achievement in the performance of duty as the Commanding Officer 3rd Battalion, the Royal Australian Regiment.
Army	Lieutenant Colonel John George Papalitsas	For outstanding achievement as Staff Officer Grade 1 Capability Development Training within Headquarters Forces Command.
Army	Lieutenant Colonel Jasmin Clarissa Shortt	For outstanding achievement as the Staff Officer Grade 1 - Transitions, Directorate of Soldier Career Management - Army, Army Headquarters.
Army	Major Mitchell John Watson	For outstanding achievement as the Officer Commanding D Squadron, 1st Armoured Regiment.
Army	Lieutenant Colonel Martin Christopher White	For outstanding achievement as the Commanding Officer 7th Signal Regiment.
Air Force	Group Captain Robert Timothy Chipman	For outstanding achievement as the Commander of Task Unit 630.1 during Operation OKRA.
Air Force	Warrant Officer Brian Edward Holdcroft	For outstanding devotion to duty as the Senior Training Manager of Air Surveillance Training at the Surveillance and Control Training Unit.
Air Force	Squadron Leader J	For outstanding achievement in establishing the Combat Control Capability for the Royal Australian Air Force.
Air Force	Sergeant Daniel Scott Mackie	For outstanding achievement as an Avionics Technician in Number 37 Squadron.
Air Force	Squadron Leader Brendan Leslie Pearce	For outstanding devotion to duty as Staff Officer Grade 2 Capability Development, Headquarters Air Mobility Group.
Air Force	Wing Commander Natasia Anne Pulford	For outstanding achievement as the Joint Program Office Integrated Logistics Systems Coordinator, Maritime Patrol and Reconnaissance Aircraft Systems Program Office.
Air Force	Warrant Officer Colin Thomas Thackler	For outstanding achievement as the Warrant Officer Engineer of the Air Component Coordination Element of Joint Task Force 639 for Operation RESOLUTE.
Air Force	Group Captain Paul Anthony Wade	For outstanding achievement as the Director Cyber Coordination Office and Head of the Information Operations Tiger Team.

=== Bar to the Conspicuous Service Medal (CSM and Bar) ===
Branch	Recipient	Citation
Navy	Warrant Officer Debbie Ann Butterworth OAM, CSM	For meritorious devotion to duty as Ship's Warrant Officer in HMAS Success.

=== Conspicuous Service Medal (CSM) ===
Conspicuous Service Medal ribbon

Branch	Recipient	Citation
Navy	Leading Seaman Mitchell John Austin	For meritorious achievement in the performance of duty as Leading Seaman Propulsion Systems Marine Technician in HMAS Arunta from March 2014 to March 2015.
Navy	Warrant Officer Gordon Keith Davis	For meritorious devotion to duty as Command Senior Sailor of NUSQN 725 and Senior Maintenance Unit Coordinator during 2013 and 2014.
Navy	Commander Narelle Melanie Devine, RAN	For meritorious achievement as the Deputy Director-Cyber (Maritime) in Joint Capability Coordination Division.
Navy	Petty Officer David Robert Howard	For meritorious devotion to duty as the Communications Systems and Navigation Aids Supervisor in HMAS Sirius.
Navy	Lieutenant Commander Petrus Martinus Jonker, RAN	For meritorious achievement as the Staff Officer Grade Two Logistics Operations within Headquarters Joint Task Force 639 on Operation RESOLUTE.
Army	Lieutenant Colonel Dean Jamie Ashton	For meritorious achievement as Deputy Director Curriculum, Australian Command and Staff College.
Army	Lieutenant Colonel Andrew Baker	For meritorious devotion to duty as Senior Instructor of the All Corps Majors Course and Advanced Operations Course, Officer Training Wing, Land Warfare Centre.
Army	Sergeant Mark Angelo Biviano	For meritorious achievement in the performance of duty as a Rifle Platoon Sergeant in the 7th Battalion, the Royal Australian Regiment.
Army	Warrant Officer Class One David Gregory Bromwich	For meritorious achievement as Regimental Sergeant Major of the 6th Battalion, the Royal Australian Regiment.
Army	Chaplain Stephen Robert Brooks	For meritorious achievement as the Brigade Coordination Chaplain, 3rd Brigade.
Army	Sergeant Colin Roger Burrows	For meritorious achievement as a movements specialist with the 2nd Commando Regiment and 1st Joint Movement Group.
Army	Warrant Officer Class Two Daniel Colin Donald	For meritorious achievement as the Supervisor Separations within the Directorate of Soldier Career Management - Army, Army Headquarters.
Army	Corporal Dean Matthew George	For meritorious achievement in the performance of duty as a Sniper Team Leader in the 6th Battalion, the Royal Australian Regiment.
Army	Warrant Officer Class One Brad Graham	For meritorious devotion to duty as the Regimental Quartermaster Sergeant of the 2nd Cavalry Regiment.
Army	Lieutenant Colonel Carrissa Cherie Ibbott	For meritorious achievements as the Deputy Director of Workforce Modelling Forecasting and Analysis - Army.
Army	Warrant Officer Class Two Joseph Phillip Laycock	For meritorious achievement in the performance of duty as the Squadron Aviation Aircrewman Instructor in the 171st Aviation Squadron, 6th Aviation Regiment.
Army	Major P	For meritorious achievement as the Officer Commanding Joint Task Force 644 in August 2014.
Army	Major R	For meritorious achievement as a signals intelligence officer.
Army	Sergeant S	For meritorious achievement in the performance of duty while posted as a Company Operations Sergeant to the 2nd Commando Regiment during 2014.
Air Force	Warrant Officer Gregory John Clive	For meritorious achievement as the Squadron Warrant Officer of Combat Survival Training School.
Air Force	Flying Officer Justin Troy Crosby	For meritorious achievement as the Technical Training Manager at Number 35 Squadron.
Air Force	Sergeant Billie-Jean Hewson	For meritorious devotion to duty as the Senior Non-Commissioned Officer Orderly Room at Number 285 Squadron.
Air Force	Flight Sergeant Gavin Todd Jones	For meritorious achievement in the improvement of aviation safety critical maintenance at Number 92 Wing.
Air Force	Squadron Leader P	For meritorious achievement on Operation OKRA.
Air Force	Squadron Leader Claire Lorraine Pearson	For meritorious achievement as Staff Officer Grade Two Requirements and Collection Management at Headquarters Joint Operations Command.
Air Force	Flight Lieutenant R	For meritorious achievement during Operation OKRA
Air Force	Squadron Leader Stephen Peter Wellings	For meritorious devotion to duty as the Commanding Officer Combat Support Unit Rotation 12 while deployed on Operation ACCORDION from 3 October 2014 to 15 April 2015.
