= Bruce French =

Bruce French may refer to:

- Bruce French (actor) (1945–2025), American actor
- Bruce French (cricketer) (born 1959), former English cricketer
- Bruce French (agricultural scientist), Australian scientist
- J. Bruce French (1921–2002), Canadian-American nuclear physicist
