= SCAS =

SCAS can stand for:

- Southern Cross Astronomical Society
- Sigur Center for Asian Studies
- Scarborough Centre for Alternative Studies, located in the former Midland Avenue Collegiate Institute
- Spence Children's Anxiety Scale, a psychological assessment tool
- Swiss Center for Affective Sciences
- South Central Ambulance Service
- Swedish Collegium for Advanced Study
