= Michael Andrew =

Michael Andrew may refer to:

- Michael Andrew (singer) (born 1965), American jazz singer, bandleader and actor
- Michael Andrew (cyclist) (born 1943), Malaysian Olympic cyclist
- Michael Andrew (management consultant) (born 1956), Australian management consultant
- Michael Andrew (swimmer) (born 1999), American swimmer

== See also ==
- Andrew Michael (disambiguation)
- Michael Andrews (disambiguation)
