= Hirt =

Hirt (German for "herder") is a German surname. Notable people with the surname include:

- Al Hirt (1922–1999), American trumpeter and bandleader
- Aloys Hirt (1759–1837), German art historian and archaeologist
- August Hirt (1898–1945), German SS officer
- Egon Hirt (born 1960), German alpine skier
- Ferenc Hirt (1967–2018), Hungarian businessman and politician
- Hassan Hirt (born 1980), French long-distance runner
- Hermann Hirt (1865–1936), German philologist and Indo-Europeanist
- Jan Hirt (born 1991), Czech cyclist
- John Hirt (born 1943), Australian pastor and educator
- Peter Hirt (1910–1992), Swiss racing driver
- Susanne Hirt (born 1973), German slalom canoeist
