= Escape from Woomera =

2004 video game

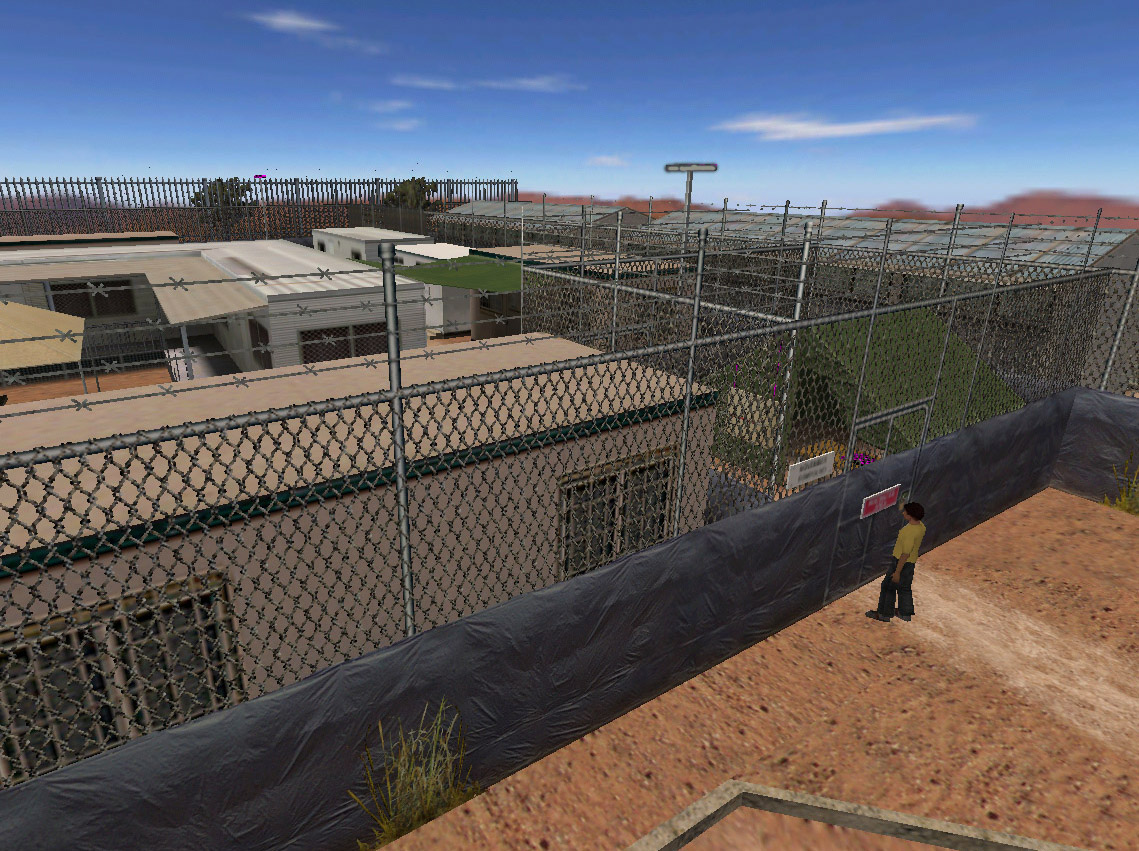
- Engine: GoldSrc
- Platform: Microsoft Windows
- Release: 7 May 2004 (incomplete)
- Genre: Adventure
- Mode: Single player

Escape from Woomera is an unfinished adventure video game, intended to criticise the treatment of mandatorily detained asylum seekers in Australia as well as the Australian government's attempt to impose a media blackout on the detention centres. In the game, the player assumes the role of Mustafa, an Iranian asylum seeker being held at Woomera Immigration Reception and Processing Centre. Mustafa's request for asylum has been denied, and, fearing that he will be killed by the Iranian government upon his repatriation to Iran, he decides to attempt to escape Woomera. Mustafa must explore Woomera and speak with other individuals at the centre to devise and execute an escape plan.

The game was developed in 2003 and 2004 by a team of Australian video game industry professionals and an investigative journalist, using Half-Life's GoldSrc engine. The developers received an AU $25,000 grant from the Australia Council to make the game, propelling the project to national attention, where the idea received a predominantly negative reception. The Australia Council's decision to fund the game drew condemnation from both Minister for Immigration Philip Ruddock and Australian Human Rights Commission leader Dr. Sev Ozdowski. Without further funding, a full game was never developed, and the playable prototype was made available free of charge online.

== Plot ==
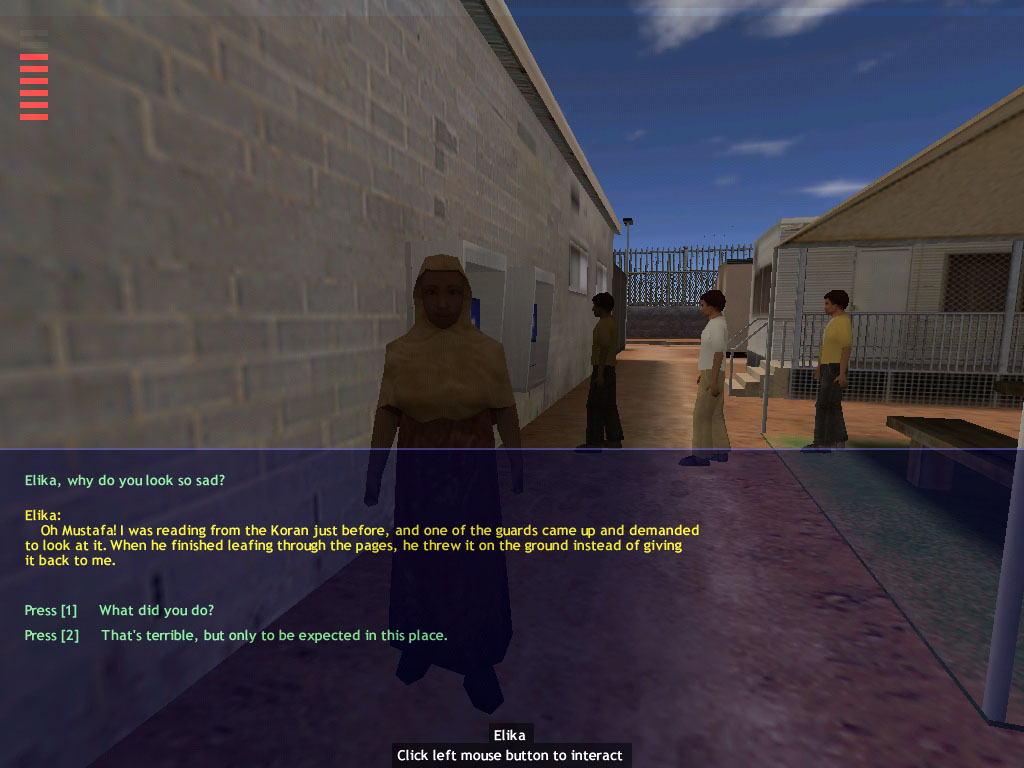
Mustafa speaks with a woman whose Quran was thrown to the ground by a guard, while detainees line up behind her to use a pay phone. In the upper left corner, the hope meter is shown.

Escape from Woomera opens with three screens of text that explain the game's background. Players assume the role of Mustafa, who paid smugglers to bring him to Australia after his parents were killed by the Iranian secret police. After the boat transporting him crashed in the Ashmore Reef, Mustafa was brought to the Woomera Immigration Reception and Processing Centre, where he was given the identification number "RAR-124". After three months, Mustafa was informed that his request for asylum was denied, and that he would be repatriated to Iran. Believing that he would be tortured and killed upon his return, Mustafa decided to escape Woomera.

Because the game was never completed, only a small portion of the intended gameplay exists. During the playable segment, Mustafa, through conversations with other detainees, discovers that another detainee is planning an escape but needs a pair of pliers to make the attempt. Mustafa must join a work detail to gain access to the pliers, hide the pliers in a garbage can to prevent them from being found during a search, recover them at night (which requires Mustafa to find a way to pry open the area that the garbage cans are stored in), and deliver them to the other detainee. The playable section ends when Mustafa delivers the pliers. Other interactions during the playable section include speaking with a detainee who, after complaining that a guard threw her copy of the Quran to the ground, mentions the existence of a partially built tunnel from a previous escape attempt.

== Gameplay ==
Escape from Woomera is an adventure game. The player, controlling Mustafa, explores the Woomera centre, which is populated with non-player characters—computer-controlled individuals that move about the facility on their own. Some of these characters can speak with Mustafa, giving him information about the facility, sharing their backgrounds or experiences at Woomera, or directing him to find and retrieve objects scattered throughout the facility. Speaking with characters and completing their tasks allows Mustafa to progress towards his goal of escaping the facility.

The game has a meter that tracks Mustafa's hope. As he completes tasks that take him towards the goal of escaping, the meter increases. Listening to the experiences of fellow detainees, which in some cases is required to gain access to other information or tasks, drains Mustafa's hope. If he is caught breaking rules by the guards, Mustafa is placed in solitary confinement, which also drains hope. Should the hope meter run out, Mustafa loses the ability to continue to attempt an escape, and is deported.

== Development ==
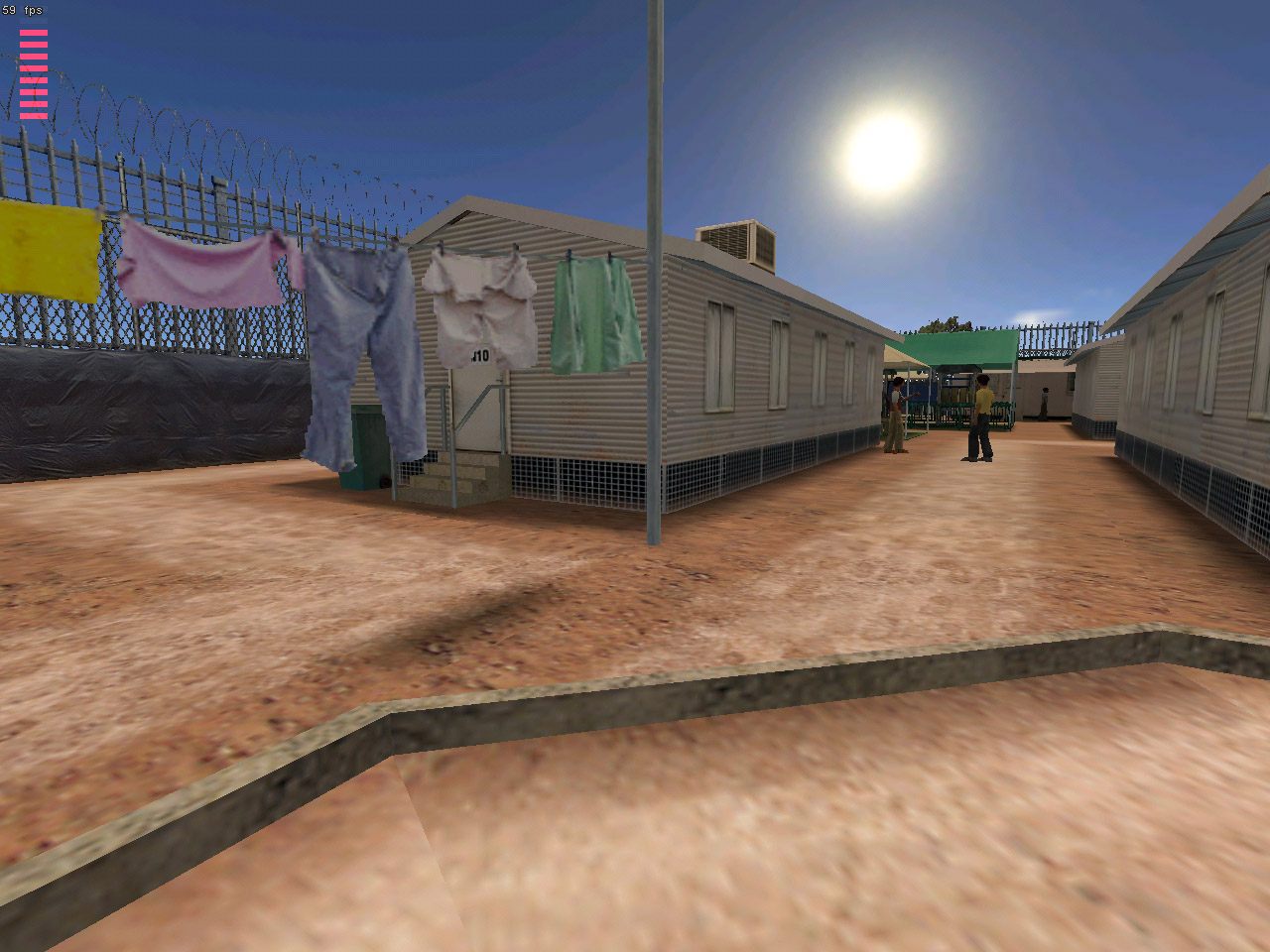
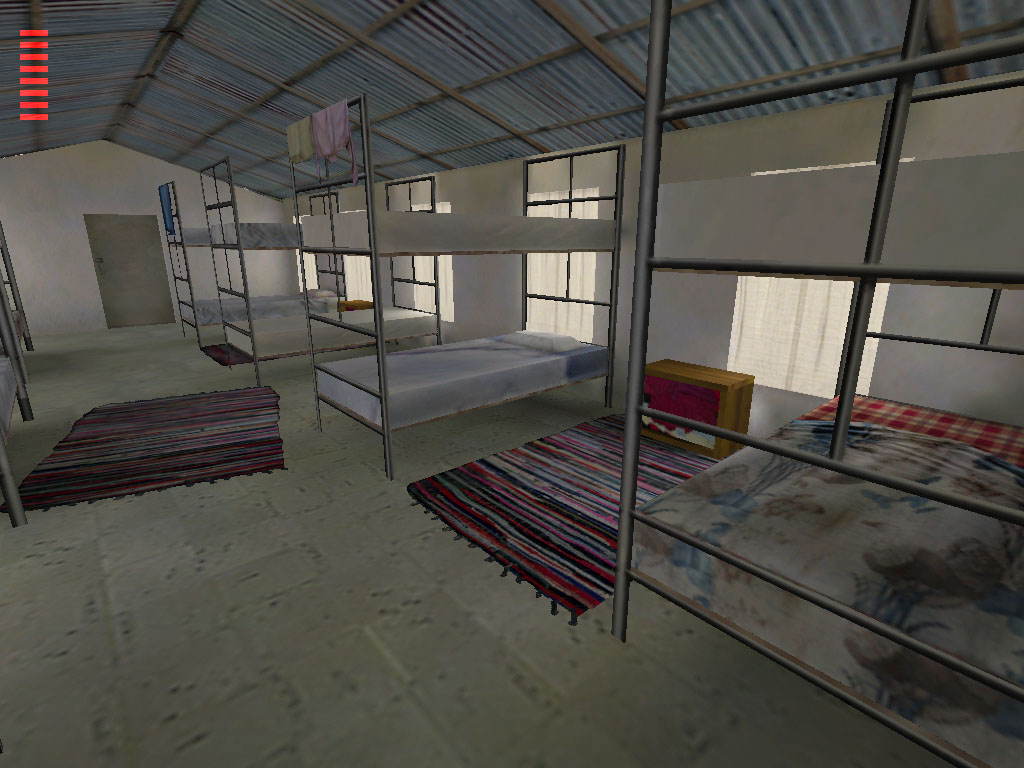

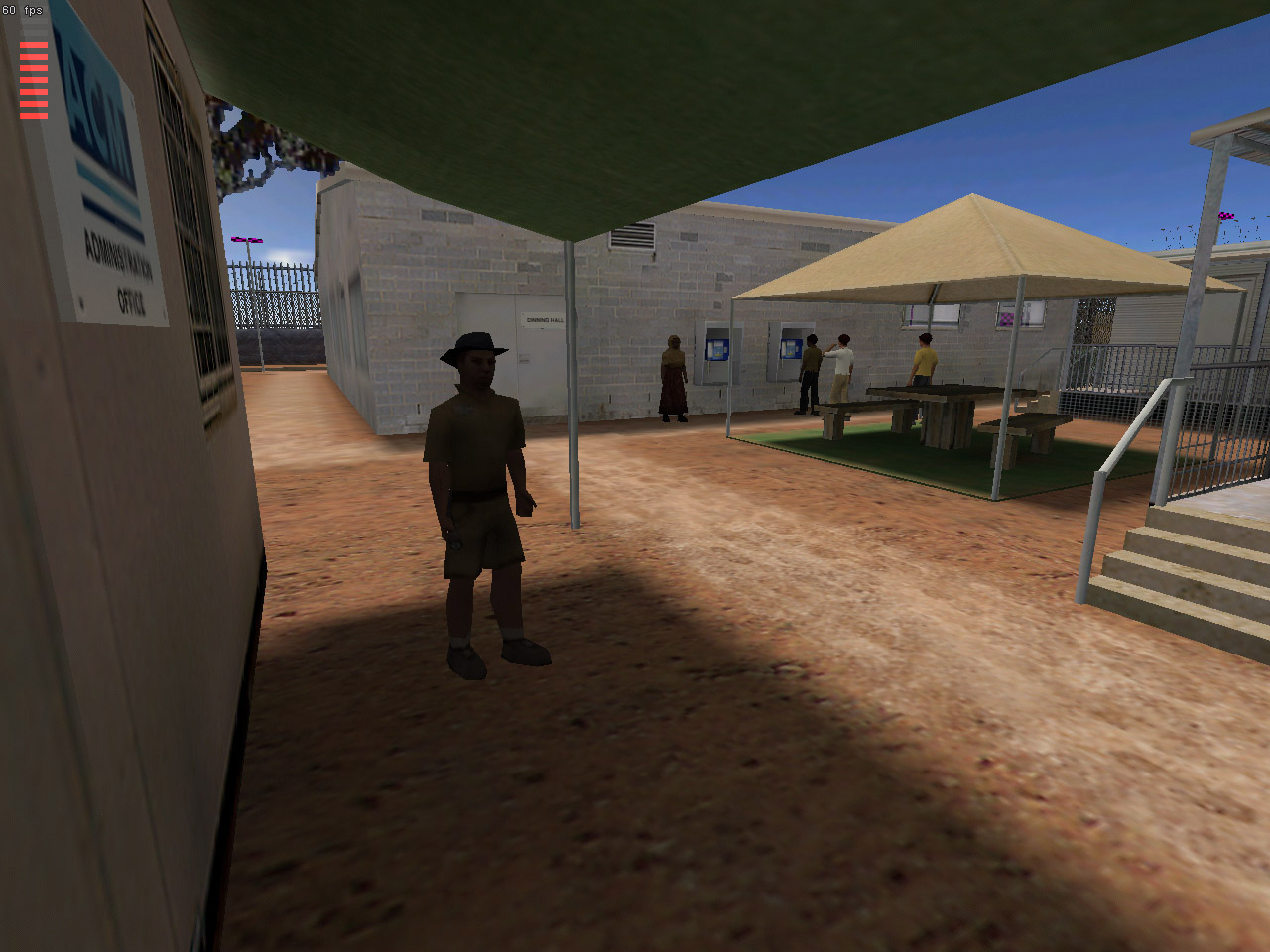
The development team tried to create a realistic depiction of the Woomera centre.

The idea for a video game centred on asylum seekers in Australia came to Katharine Neil, then a developer at Atari's Melbourne studio, in the aftermath of the 2001 Tampa affair. Neil spent a year and a half assembling a team to work on the game and securing initial funding for the project. Fourteen people contributed to the game, with a core development team of four. Many of the Australian members of the development team, including Neil, contributed to the project anonymously to protect their jobs.

Neil stated that her motivation for the project was a desire to create a video game in which the asylum seekers were the heroes. The purpose of the game, according to Neil, was twofold. The team wanted to criticise the treatment of detained asylum seekers in Australia, and they also wanted to prove that video games were capable of the task. At the time, the idea that video games could convey political topics in a serious manner, and that they were a form of culture worth being taken seriously, had not caught on strongly. The game also was a statement against the Australian government's attempts to suppress media access to, and coverage of, the detention facilities.

The original plan for Escape from Woomera involved several choices in playable detainees, each with a different story about how they came to seek asylum in Australia. The game would have players "battle the bureaucracy and try and survive day to day" while working towards any of several escape strategies. As originally envisioned, players could attempt to escape through the legal channels, using lawyers and activists, or could attempt to flee by scaling fences or digging tunnels. The development team worked to create the most realistic depiction of the Woomera centre possible, despite the media not being allowed in the facility. The team utilised interviews with former detainees and activists, existing press reports, and a copy of the facility's floor plan obtained from a member of the Department of Immigration. Kate Wild, an investigative journalist hired by the development team to conduct research, was able to visit Baxter Immigration Reception and Processing Centre. She witnessed guards using spotlights and helicopters to keep detainees awake throughout the night, and police on horseback trampling over tents. Aside from Woomera and Baxter, Port Hedland Immigration Reception and Processing Centre and Villawood Immigration Detention Centre were also used as influences. Details from the daily lives of detainees, such as their being referred to by number and communicating with the outside world through payphones, were incorporated into the game. Tasks that players had to complete, as well as the escape strategies themselves, were also based on the experiences of real detainees.

Initial funding for the development of Escape from Woomera came from the Australian government's arts funding organisation, the Australia Council for the Arts. The Australia Council gave the developers AUD $25,000, intended to get the game developed to the point that it could secure funding from other sources. While a playable section of the game was developed, the developers never received additional funding. The playable demo, which was built as a modification of the video game Half-Life, was made available for download on the game's website.

== Reception ==
The Australia Council's decision to fund Escape from Woomera was poorly received. The game received heavy criticism before development even began. Australia's Minister for Immigration, Philip Ruddock, released a statement saying that the "decision reflects poorly upon the Australia Council and its judgement, that the organisation should lend its name to the promotion of unlawful behaviour". Kate Wild, in a 2013 interview, recalled that she was surprised at how strongly Ruddock attacked the game, a reaction she attributed to the government being sensitive over the issue of detainee treatment. The leader of the Australian Human Rights Commission, Dr. Sev Ozdowski, released a strongly worded statement accusing the game of misconstruing asylum seekers as criminals, and saying that "The idea of using issues in detention for entertainment is simply sick." Chairman Michael Snelling of the New Media Arts Board, the branch of the Australia Council that granted the development money, defended the decision to fund Escape from Woomera, stating that the game's purpose was not to promote crime. He characterised the team's application for funding as both strong and closely aligned with the New Media Arts Board's goal of promoting cross-disciplinary media.

In the 2010s, the retrospective view of Escape from Woomera is significantly more positive. In 2013, the Australian Broadcasting Corporation called it "one of the first—and still one of the most important—politically-focused videogames". The textbook The Alternative Media Handbook used the game as a case study in culture jamming, and categorised it as an early example of video games carrying a political message.
