= Michael Andrews =

Michael Andrews may refer to:

- Michael Andrews (artist) (1928–1995), British artist
- Michael Andrews (boxer), Nigerian boxer
- Michael Andrews (musician) (born 1967), American musician
- Michael Andrews (rugby league) (born 1962), Australian rugby league footballer
- Michael A. Andrews (born 1944), member of the United States House of Representatives in the 103rd United States Congress
- Mike Andrews (born 1943), American baseball player
- Mike Andrews (footballer) (born 1946), Australian rules football player for Fitzroy
- Mickey Andrews (born 1942), American football coach
- Michael Andrews (referee) (born 1956), Indian football referee

== See also ==
- Michael Andrew (disambiguation)
