= Robert Stanley Pontifex =

Robert Stanley Pontifex (born 27 December 1942) is a resident of North Adelaide, South Australia.

On Australia Day 2016, he was honoured as a Member of the Order of Australia in the General Division for significant service to the community of South Australia, particularly through support for the arts.

Pontifex is well known for his contribution to art, music and theatre, especially his work with the Adelaide Symphony Orchestra.
