= Ann Harding (economist) =

Australian economist and academic (1958–2023)

Ann Harding AO FASSA
- Born: Ann Margaret Harding; 18 May 1958
- Died: 30 January 2023 (aged 64)
- Occupations: Economist, academic

Academic background
- Education: University of Sydney
- Alma mater: London School of Economics
- Thesis: Lifetime income distribution and redistribution in Australia: Applications of a dynamic cohort microsimulation model (1991)

Academic work
- Discipline: Economist
- Sub-discipline: Microsimulation modelling
- Institutions: National Centre for Social and Economic Modelling, University of Canberra

Ann Margaret Harding AO FASSA (18 May 1958 – 30 January 2023) was an Australian economist and Emeritus Professor at the University of Canberra.

== Academic career ==
Harding completed a Bachelor of Economics from the University of Sydney. She was a contributor to Business Review magazine in 1980 and then joined the Department of the Parliamentary Library in Canberra as a legislative research specialist in January 1981. In 1982 she was employed as a policy analyst by the Department of Social Security. She graduated from the London School of Economics in 1991 with a PhD. Her thesis was titled Lifetime income distribution and redistribution in Australia: Applications of a dynamic cohort microsimulation model.

Harding returned to Australia to the University of Canberra where she was appointed Professor of Applied Economics and Social Policy on 12 October 1992, at 34 becoming one of the youngest women professors in Australia. In 1993 she founded and was inaugural Director of the National Centre for Social and Economic Modelling, remaining in that position until 2009, when she moved into a research role. She was made an Emeritus Professor of the University of Canberra in 2014.

Harding's research focused on microsimulation modelling and she was a regular contributor to public policy.

Harding died on 30 January 2023, at the age of 64.

== Honours and recognition ==
Harding was elected a Fellow of the Academy of the Social Sciences in Australia in 1996. In the 2016 Australia Day Honours she was appointed Officer of the Order of Australia for "distinguished service to education in the field of applied economics and social policy analysis, as an academic, researcher and author, and to professional organisations".

The Ann Harding Conference Centre at the University of Canberra is named in recognition of her contribution to the university.

== Selected works ==
- Harding, Ann (14 October 1993), Lifetime income distribution and redistribution: Applications of a microsimulation model, North-Holland (published 1993), ISBN 978-0-444-89843-2
- Harding, Ann, ed. (22 April 1996), Microsimulation and public policy: Selected papers from the IARIW Special Conference on Microsimulation and Public Policy, Canberra, 5-9 December, 1993, Elsevier (published 1996), ISBN 978-0-444-81894-2
- Harding, Ann; Gupta, Anil (2007), Modelling our Future, Volume 15: Population Ageing, Social Security and Taxation, Emerald Group Publishing Limited, ISBN 978-0-08-047156-3
- Zaidi, Asghar; Harding, Ann; Williamson, Paul (2009), New Frontiers in Microsimulation Modelling, Ashgate Publishing Limited, ISBN 978-0-7546-7647-8
- Rahman, Azizur; Harding, Ann (15 November 2015), Small area estimation and microsimulation modelling, CRC Press, Taylor & Francis Group (published 2017), ISBN 978-1-4822-6072-4
