= Nicholas Tonti-Filippini =

Australian bioethicist

Nicholas Antony Tonti-Filippini AO (5 July 1956 – 7 November 2014) was an Australian bioethicist. He was a leading spokesman against voluntary euthanasia.

Tonti-Filippini was born in Melbourne and raised in Bendigo, where he attended St Vincent's College. He studied at Monash University and later obtained a PhD from the University of Melbourne. At age 21, he was diagnosed with rheumatoid autoimmune disease and given just five years to live. He became director of the Bioethics Department at St Vincent's Hospital, Melbourne, and later worked as research officer for the Australian Catholic Bishops Conference. At the time of his death, he was associate dean and head of bioethics at the John Paul II Institute for Marriage and Family in Melbourne.

Tonti-Filippini was posthumously given the Officer of the Order of Australia award as part of the 2016 Australia Day Honours, for "distinguished service to tertiary education, particularly in the area of bioethics, through academic leadership and advisory roles, and to medical research."

Tonti-Filippini was also a Knight Commander of the Order of St Gregory the Great and a Knight of Magistral Grace in Obedience of the Sovereign Military Order of Malta.
