= Andrew Michael =

Andrew Michael may refer to:

- Andrew Michael (entrepreneur) (born 1980), British entrepreneur
- Andrew Michael Ramsay (1686–1743), writer

== See also ==
- Andrew McMichael (born 1943), English immunologist
- Michael Andrew (disambiguation)
