= Graeme Alistair Clugston =

Australian physician and former director

Graeme Clugston AO is an Australian physician and former director of the World Health Organization's (WHO) Global Nutrition Program (Division of Health and Promotion); Director of WHO's Food and Nutrition Program; and WHO's regional nutrition advisor for South-East Asia. Clugston's work for WHO in South-East Asia included a 1986 mission by the Emergency Preparedness and Planning Unit to investigate health conditions in encampments on the Thai-Kampuchean (now Cambodian) border. (In the 1980s, hundreds of thousands of Cambodians fleeing regional conflict were housed in border camps).

Since 2007, Clugston and his wife, Meena, have worked with the charity Nepal Leprosy Trust (NLT). NLT provides services to people affected by leprosy in Nepal. Clugston continued to work on fundraising and medical activities with NLT in Nepal through the COVID-19 pandemic in 2020–21.

In 2016, Clugston was made an Officer of the Order of Australia in the General Division for "distinguished service to medicine, and to the international community of Nepal, particularly to people with leprosy, and to global health and nutrition."
