= Susan H. Spence =

Australian psychology professor

Susan H. Spence AO
- Born: 29 September 1953 (age 72); Ely, Cambridgeshire, England
- Citizenship: Australian
- Scientific career
- Fields: Psychology

Susan Hilary Spence AO (born 29 September 1953) is an Australian scientist whose work in clinical psychology is focussed on the causes, assessment, prevention and treatment of depression and anxiety in young people. Throughout the course of her career she has remained consistently at the forefront of this research area, has published widely and has been a regular recipient of national competitive grant funding.

In the area of mental health she is or has been a member of a number of State and Commonwealth committees and grant providers. She is or has been on the boards of several top international journals in the area of mental health. She is currently an Emeritus Professor in the School of Psychology and Australian Institute for Suicide Research and Prevention at Griffith University, Queensland, Australia. She is the developer of the Spence Children's Anxiety Scale, a psychological questionnaire used to assess children aged 8 to 15.

== Background and education ==
After attending Scarborough Girls' High School (Scarborough, North Yorkshire), Spence undertook her studies at the University of Reading (1971–1974) and completed her PhD in Clinical Psychology at the University of Birmingham (1976–1979). She also undertook a Master of Business Administration (MBA) at the University of Sydney (1983–1985).

== Career appointments ==
In 1979, Spence commenced her career as a Lecturer in Clinical Psychology at the Institute of Psychiatry, University of London with a concurrent appointment as a Senior Clinical Psychologist with Southwark Social Services (1979-1982). She then emigrated to Australia to take up the position of Lecturer in Psychology at the University of Sydney (1982-1986) followed by a Senior Lecturership (1987-1992). In 1993, she moved to the University of Queensland where she was a Reader in Psychology (1993-1996), Professor of Psychology, (1997–2005), Head of the School of Psychology (1997-1999), Head of the School of Journalism and Communication (2001-2002), and Deputy President of Academic Board (2002–2005).

Spence was then appointed Dean of Division of Linguistics and Psychology at Macquarie University (Sydney) (2006-2007) before returning to Queensland to Griffith University where she held the positions of Pro-Vice Chancellor (Quality and Student Outcomes) (2007-2009) and Deputy Vice Chancellor (Academic) (2009–2014). In 2014 she took up the position of Professor Emeritus at Griffith University. Other appointments included:-

- Honorary Professor at the University of Queensland (2010-2023)
- Member of the Board of Directors of Open Universities Australia (3 years prior to 2013)
- Member of the Board of Directors, Australian Association for Cognitive Behaviour Therapy (2018-2022)

== Awards and honours ==
- Fellow of the Australian Psychological Society (1990)
- Fellow of the British Psychological Society (1991)
- Fellow of the Academy of the Social Sciences in Australia (1995)
- Founding Fellow, Academy of Cognitive Therapy (2000)
- Ian Campbell Memorial Prize for Clinical Psychology (2009)
- Aitana Career Achievement Award, Barcelona, Spain (2016)
- Officer of the Order of Australia (2016)
- Distinguished Career Award, Australian Association of Cognitive Behaviour Therapy (2018)

== Research and clinical areas ==
Spence's early research in the UK focussed on the development of social skills training interventions for children and adolescents, particularly as a way if aiding the psychosocial development of young offenders. After moving to Australia in 1982, her research shifted to examine the causes, assessment, treatment and prevention of anxiety and depression in youth. A key aspect of Spence’s work has related to the translation of research outcomes into clinical resources and interventions that are accessible by practitioners. She is the developer of the Spence Children’s Anxiety Scale (SCAS) which is widely used internationally and translated into multiple languages. She was also a lead researcher on two major studies involving the development and evaluation of school-based interventions for prevention of depression, including the Problem Solving for Life program and the beyondblue schools research initiative which informed school-based programs for the prevention of depression internationally.

In 2002, Spence and colleagues started work to develop and evaluate the Brave Online program for anxious children, teenagers, and their parents. After a series of randomized controlled trials showing the effectiveness in reducing anxiety in yong people when online treatment is supported by a mental health professional, Spence and colleagues extended their research to examine the feasibility and outcomes of the program when it was made openly available to the Australian population on a self-help basis. Over a 10 year period from 2014 to 2024, over 80,000 Australian children, teenagers, and parents enrolled in the self-help Brave Online program. The Program, with therapist guidance, was also implemented in New Zealand with anxious young people following the 2011 Christchurch earthquake.
