= Bruce French (agricultural scientist) =

Australian pastor and agricultural scientist

Bruce Reginald French AO is an Australian pastor and agricultural scientist.

French founded Food Plants International in 1999 with the goal of documenting food plants around the world. As of August 2020, there were 31,170 edible plant species detailed on its website.

French was made an Officer of the Order of Australia in the 2016 Australia Day Honours list, for "distinguished service to agricultural science through the provision of edible plant information for improved food security, nutrition, and improved health outcomes for people in developing countries." On 29 October 2021, he was named the 2022 Tasmanian Senior Australian of the Year.

French has also pastored two churches in Tasmania: Romaine Park Christian Centre and Penguin Baptist Church.
