= Michael Andrew (management consultant) =

Australian management consultant

Michael Andrew AO
- Born: June 1956
- Alma mater: University of Melbourne

Michael John Andrew AO is an Australian management consultant and former global chairman and CEO of KPMG.

Andrew has served on the International Advisory Board for the Moscow International Financial Centre, the International Business Council of the World Economic Forum, the Business Council of Australia, and the Steering Committee of the United Nations Global Compact for the environment.

In January 2016, Andrew was appointed an Officer of the Order of Australia for distinguished service to the accountancy profession at the national and international level, and to a range of business, anti-corruption, finance and community organisations.
