= John Hirt =

Australian pastor, educator

John Hirt OAM (born 1943) is an Australian pastor, educator, and one of the leaders of the radical discipleship movement in Australia.

== Education ==
Hirt attended the NSW Baptist Theological College, where he obtained the Licentiate in Theology, and was subsequently ordained as a Baptist minister. Later he studied in the Department of Studies in Religion, at the University of Sydney, where he obtained a Doctor of Philosophy degree.

== Professional career ==
Hirt was one of the founders of the House of the New World in Sydney, described by one church historian as “a Christian counter-cultural experiment”. He has pastored at Avalon Peace Baptist Church and Leichhardt Uniting Church, has served as a University Chaplain and theological lecturer, and has been instrumental in developing various Christian training programmes.

John was the University Chaplain at the University of Sydney for 20 years. During this time he started the denominational group the Uniting Church in Australia Tertiary Students Association (UCATSA) and then the new group Christian Students Uniting (CSU). In 2004 he founded the School of Discipleship, which organizes seminars and conferences in Sydney, and he is currently a leader of the Radical Discipleship Network.

== Activism ==
Hirt has been a campaigner for many years on issues of peace, nuclear disarmament, and social justice, and he has linked this with the notion of radical Christian discipleship. In 1985, the Avalon Peace Baptist Church, at which he was then pastor, had a brick thrown through a glass pane of a door, as a result his advocacy for refugees from Central America.

His family have also joined him in his activism, notably his wife Carol who is the Manager of Epworth House for students at Leichhart Uniting Church,

His son is Jono Hirt who is the Sydney Presbytery Communications Manager.

== Recognition ==
On 26 January 2016, Hirt was admitted as a Member of the Order of Australia, in recognition of “significant service to the Uniting Church in Australia, particularly through theological direction, to youth, and to the community”.

== Publications ==
- Hirt, J.A. 1988. Radical Discipleship: Narrative Theology towards the History and Theological Implications of the House of the New World. The Baptist Recorder. No.4/88. pp. 7–10.
- Hirt, J.A. 1998. Radical Discipleship: Towards the Theology and Sociopolitical Implications. PhD thesis. University of Sydney.
- Hirt, J. A. 2002. Catechetical Evangelism as Radical Discipleship in the Mission of the Church. In: D. Neville (Ed.). Prophecy and Passion: Essays in Honours of Athol Gill. (300-325). Adelaide: Australian Theological Forum.
