= Sev Ozdowski =

Australian sociologist

Sev Ozdowski AM
- Born: Seweryn Antoni Ozdowski; 24 June 1949 (age 77); Poland
- Education: Poznań University; University of New England
- Occupation: Australian Human Rights Commission
- Known for: Sociologist
- Title: Professor

Seweryn Antoni "Sev" Ozdowski AM (born 24 June 1949, in Poland) is an Australian human rights advocate and social researcher, former senior civil servant and Human Rights Commissioner and Disability Discrimination Commissioner for the Australian government from 2000 to 2005. Ozdowski is known for his defence of human rights of refugees, especially child asylum seekers detained in Australia and people with disabilities and mental illness as well as for his contribution to multicultural policies in Australia.

Born in Poland, Ozdowski graduated with a Master of Laws (LLM) in 1971 and Master of Arts (MA) in Sociology in 1973 from Poznań University, Poland and with a Doctor of Philosophy (PhD) from the University of New England, Armidale, New South Wales in 1980. In 1984 he was awarded the Harkness Fellowship for post-graduate work at Harvard, Georgetown and Berkeley Universities in USA (1984–86).

== Career ==
Ozdowski was the Australian Human Rights Commissioner and Disability Discrimination Commissioner from 2000 to 2005. During this time Ozdowski authored the report about the National Inquiry into Children in Immigration Detention (2004), A Last Resort?, which talks about the human rights of the children who arrived in Australia to seek protection from Autocratic rule of Iraq and Afghanistan. As Disability Discrimination Commissioner, in 2005 Ozdowski conducted the National Inquiry into Mental Health Services Not for Service. Currently Ozdowski is Professor and the Director of the Equity and Diversity department at the University of Western Sydney. and Honorary Professor at the Department of Peace and Conflict Studies, the University of Sydney. From 2006 to 2018 he served as President of the Australian Council for Human Rights Education. The International Human Rights Education (IHRE) Conferences which were initiated in 2010 by Ozdowski to advance human rights culture world-wide, have been held in Sydney, Australia; Durban, South Africa; Cracow, Poland; Taipei, Taiwan; Washington DC, USA; Middelburg, Holland; Montreal, Canada and most recently in Australia. For more about the IHREC see:. In December 2014 Ozdowski has been appointed Chair of the Australian Multicultural Council by the Australian Government. Since 2017 Ozdowski serves as Chair, Welcoming Cities Committee, Scanlon Foundation (Melbourne) and as Member of Affinity Intercultural Foundation Advisory Board, Sydney. In November 2018 Ozdowski was appointed as Professor at the Western Sydney University, Sydney Australia.

== Awards ==
In 2016 Ozdowski was appointed a Member of the Order of Australia (AM) for significant service to the community, particularly to human rights education, social justice and multiculturalism, and as an academic.

Other awards include:

- 1982 Justice of the Peace, Australian Capital Territory
- 1985 Letter of Commendation, Coordinating Office Abroad of NSZZ "Solidarnosc", Bruxelles
- 1987 Honorary Badge Diploma, Polish Ex-Servicemen's Association, London
- 1995 Medal of the Order of Australia (OAM) for "service to the Polish community and to furthering Australian Polish relations"
- 2000 Knight's Cross of the Order of Merit of the Republic of Poland.
- 2004 Doctor of Social Science Honoris Causa, RMIT University, Melbourne.
- 2005 FECCA 25th Anniversary Medal for Contribution to Australian Multiculturalism.
- 2005 Solidarity 25th Anniversary Medal awarded by the Republic of Poland.
- 2007 Officer's Cross of the Order of Merit of the Republic of Poland.
- 2007 Honorary Professor, University of Sydney
- 2012 Life Honorary Member, Golden Key International Honour Society
- 2014 Rotary International Paul Harris Recognition Award for Human Rights Work
- 2016 Member (AM) in the General Division of the Order of Australia
- 2018 Fellow, Royal Society of New South Wales
- 2019 Distinguished Alumni Award, The University of New England, Armidale
- 2021 Friends of Falun Gong Human Rights Award, Washington DC, USA.

== Sources ==
- Ozdowski, S (2009). "Human Rights and the Beijing Olympics". Political Crossroads. 16 (1): 51–74. doi:10.7459/pc/16.1.04.

http://www.sevozdowski.com/wp-content/uploads/2012/06/Keynote-address-by-Dr-Sev-Ozdowski-OAM.pdf

- Ozdowski, S. (2012) Goh Bee Chen; Baden Offord; Rob Garbutt, eds. (2012). "Human rights and the Beijing Olympics". Activating Human Rights and Peace: Theories, Practices and Contexts. England: Ashgate Publishing. pp. 119–141. ISBN 978-1-4094-3076-6.;
- https://www.onlineopinion.com.au/view.asp?article=13102
- Ozdowski, S (2009) "An Absence of Human Rights: Children in Detention". pp. 39–72 in Political Crossroads, Vol. 16, Number 2, 2009
- Ozdowski, S. (2015) "Human rights education in Australia." In Zajda, J. (Ed.), Second international handbook on globalization, education and policy research. Dordrecht. Springer. https://link.springer.com/chapter/10.1007/978-94-017-9493-0_31
- Ozdowski, S. (2016) Relevance of Australian Immigration and Multicultural Experience to Poland and Contemporary Europe. Published by Adam Mickiewicz University, Poznan, Poland. ISBN 978-83-63047-95-5.
- Ozdowski, S. (2016) Racism, Equality and Civil Liberties in a Multicultural Australia. In Globalisation, Human Rights Education and Reforms. pp. 187–220. ISBN 978-94-024-0870-6, Springer Science+Business Media Dordrecht. https://link.springer.com/chapter/10.1007/978-94-024-0871-3_12
- Ozdowski, S. (2016) Australia: Immigration and Multiculturalism. pp. 175 – 248 in Krakowskie Studia Miedzynarodowe No. 4 (xiii), Cracow; https://www.academia.edu/32450857/2016_10_06_FINAL_AUSTRALIA_IMMIGRATION_MULTICULTURALISM_for_Krakowskie_Studia_Miedzynarodowe_1_docx?email_work_card=interaction-paper
- Ozdowski, S. (2017) Importance of Heritage Languages to Australia’s Social and Economic Future; pp 303–318 in Leszek Korporowicz, Sylwia Jaskuła, Malgožata Stefanovič, Paweł Plichta (eds) Jagiellonian Ideas Towards Challenges of Modern Times; Kraków 2017 https://ruj.uj.edu.pl/xmlui/handle/item/54748
- Osler, A., Flatås, B. A., & Ozdowski, S. Networking to promote and transform human rights education. Human Rights Education Review, 2(2), 1–6. https://doi.org/10.7577/HRER.3570
- Ozdowski, S. (2020) Human Rights as an Instrument of Social Cohesion in South Asia. In: Zajda J. (eds) Human Rights Education Globally. Globalisation, Comparative Education and Policy Research, vol 22. Springer, Dordrecht https://link.springer.com/chapter/10.1007/978-94-024-1913-9_9/
- Ozdowski, S. (2020) History of Multiculturalism in Canada and Australia: its aim, successes, and challenges to national identity; Chapter 11 in Abe W. Ata (editor) Muslim Minorities and Social Cohesion Cultural Fragmentation in the West; Imprint Routledge, London; eBook ISBN 9781003044529
