= Operation Okra =

Australian contribution to the military intervention against ISIL

- Part of the US-led intervention in Iraq (2014–2021), Foreign involvement in the Syrian civil war and the War against the Islamic State
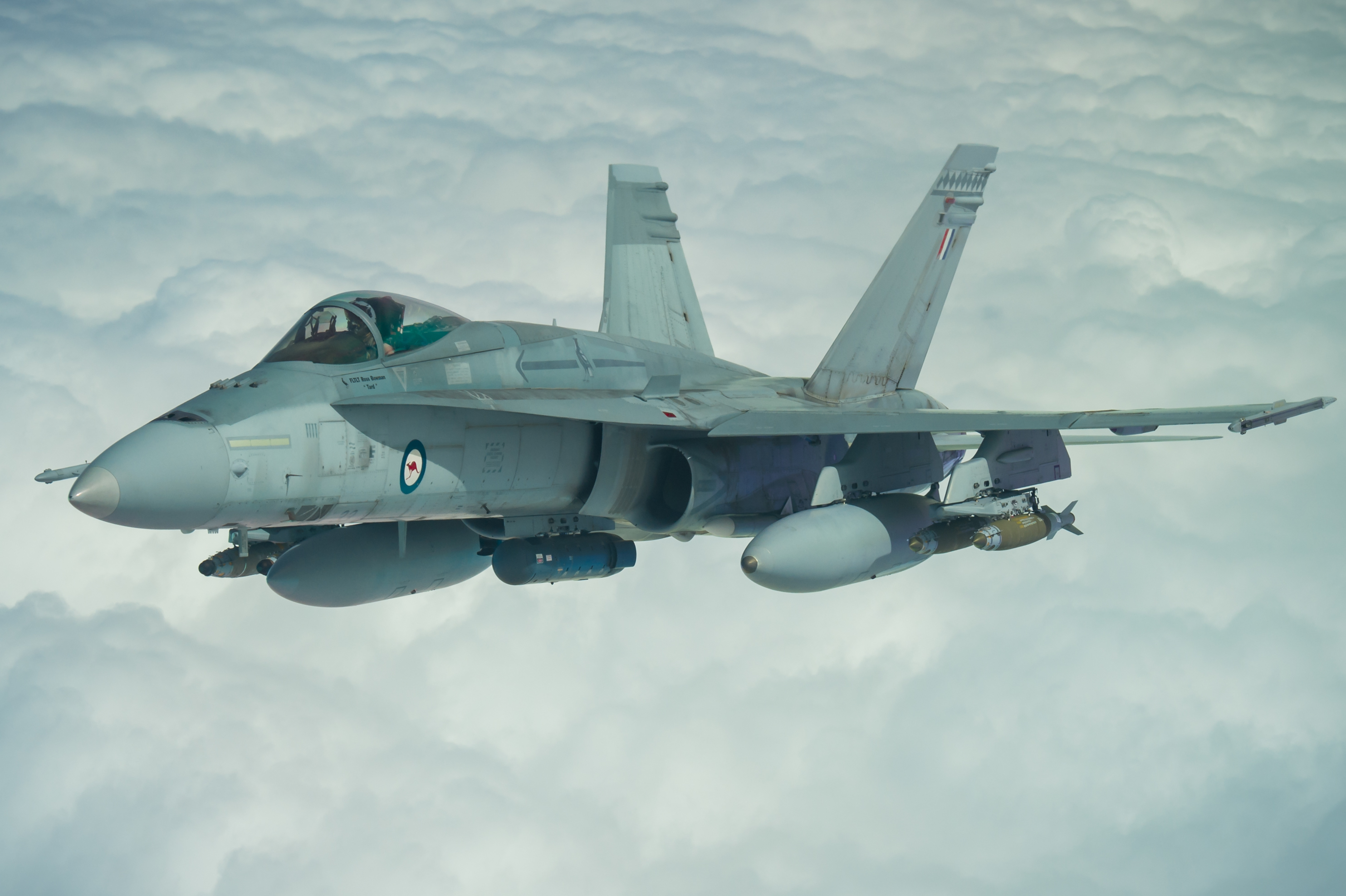
- An Australian F/A-18A Hornet over Iraq in 2017
- Location: Iraq and Syria
- Objective: Australia's contribution to the War against ISIL
- Date: 31 August 2014 – 20 December 2024 (10 years, 3 months and 4 weeks)
- Executed by: Australian Army; Royal Australian Air Force; Australian Signals Directorate

Operation Okra was the Australian Defence Force (ADF) contribution to the military intervention against the Islamic State. The deployed forces formed part of Joint Task Force 633 in the Middle East. The operation commenced on 31 August 2014, and its initial stated aim was to combat ISIL threats in Iraq. In September 2015, the Australian airstrikes were extended to Syria. In June 2017, flights in Syria were temporarily halted in response to American forces shooting down a Syrian Air Force jet, before later being resumed.

Operation Okra concluded in December 2024.

== Development of the Australian contribution ==
=== Airstrikes against ISIL in Iraq ===
The Australian government announced on 14 September 2014 that an Air Task Group (ATG) of up to eight F/A-18F Super Hornets, an E-7A Wedgetail AEW&C aircraft, and a KC-30A air-to-air refuelling tanker, along with a Special Operations Task Force, would be deployed to the Middle East in preparation for possible operations against ISIL forces. The ATG commenced operations on 1 October, and on 3 October, Prime Minister Tony Abbott announced that his country would commence airstrikes. Australian forces operate from Al Minhad Air Base in the United Arab Emirates. Australian aircraft have also been reported to have flown out of Al Dhafra Air Base south of Abu Dhabi. An Australian Army training team known as Task Group Taji was deployed to Iraq in April 2015 to assist with training the regular Iraqi Security Forces. The force is part of Joint Task Force 633 in the Middle East, originally under the command of Major General Craig Orme. Orme handed over command of JTF 633 to Rear Admiral Trevor Jones in December 2014.

=== Extension with airstrikes against ISIL in Syria ===
Airstrikes were extended to Syria in September 2015.

In late 2015 the United States Government asked the Australian Government, along with other members of the coalition, to expand its military commitment to the war. The Australian Government rejected this request in January 2016, but stated that it would increase the number of Australian personnel attached to the coalition headquarters from 20 to 30 and was considering increasing the amount of humanitarian aid it provides to people affected by the war in Iraq and Syria.

The strikes within Syria were reported to have been temporarily suspended on 20 June 2017 after the US shot down a Syrian aircraft. Operations over Syria resumed several days later, with an airstrike reported to have been carried out in the Middle Euphrates River Valley on 23 June 2017.

Operation Okra concluded on 20 December 2024.

== Air force component ==
=== Humanitarian air drops and munition and arms resupply ===
From August 2014 a number of C-17 and C-130J transport aircraft based in the Middle East have also been used to conduct airdrops of humanitarian aid and to airlift arms and munitions. On the night of 13–14 August an RAAF C-130J was part of a 16-aircraft mission including US C-17s and C-130Hs and a British C-130J which delivered supplies to Yezidi civilians trapped on Mount Sinjar. A second drop was later conducted to deliver supplies to isolated civilians in the northern Iraqi town of Amirli. Later, a C-130J was involved in the airlift arms and munitions to forces in Kurdish-controlled northern Iraq in late-September.

=== Air Task Group ===
In late-September 2014, an Air Task Group (ATG) of 400 personnel from the Royal Australian Air Force (RAAF) was deployed to Al Minhad Air Base in the United Arab Emirates as part of the coalition to combat Islamic State forces in Iraq. The initial commitment of aircraft included: six F/A-18F Super Hornet strike aircraft from No. 1 Squadron RAAF, one E-7A Wedgetail Airborne Early Warning and Control aircraft from No. 2 Squadron RAAF and one KC-30A Multi Role Tanker Transport from No. 33 Squadron RAAF. The ATG began operations on 1 October 2014.

Between 6–17 October, Australian aircraft flew 54 sorties. In at least two of them, a number of ISIL fighters were killed. Australian planes attacked ISIL military equipment and facilities in support of Iraqi and Kurdish troops on the ground. Vice Admiral David Johnston refused to give more details on the number of casualties or locations of airstrikes due to the "aggressive propaganda campaign" of ISIL. In late–December 2014 Australian Super Hornets were involved in assisting Kurdish ground forces free Yezidi people trapped on Mount Sinjar along with other coalition aircraft.

A second ATG arrived in the UAE in early-January 2015 to replace the first group of personnel and operate the aircraft originally deployed in September 2014. Providing an operational update on 12 January 2015, the Chief of Joint Operations, Vice Admiral David Johnston, stated that Australian aircraft provide around 13 percent of coalition airstrikes in Iraq.

Six single-seat F/A-18As from No. 75 Squadron RAAF based at Tindal deployed to the Middle East to replace the six dual-seat F/A-18Fs in March 2015. On 30 June 2015 the Department of Defence reported that the ATG had dropped more than 400 munitions in support of Iraqi forces since the commencement of operations with the F/A-18A Hornets and F/A-18F Super Hornets flying nearly 5000 hours, the E-7A Wedgetail completing 100 operational sorties, and the KC‑30A air-to-air refuelling aircraft providing 25 million pounds of fuel to Australian and coalition aircraft. By the end of November 2015 the F/A-18A Hornets had conducted 580 sorties over Iraq, during which they dropped 363 munitions. The aircraft also flew 18 sorties over Syria in September 2015, dropping two munitions.

Rotations from No. 77 Squadron RAAF took over the deployment in September 2015, and were in turn replaced by No. 3 Squadron RAAF in April 2016.

On 18 September 2016, two F/A-18As and a E-7A Wedgetail formed part of a multi-national force consisting of US, UK, and Danish aircraft which accidentally bombed Syrian Army forces near the city of Deir ez-Zor.

In late-December 2017 it was announced that the strike aircraft attached to the ATG had ceased air combat operations and would return to Australia in January 2018, although the KC-30 and Wedgetail will remain in support of ongoing coalition operations. This announcement followed the earlier recapture of the last remaining ISIL held areas of Iraq by government forces. The final RAAF strike mission was flown by two Super Hornets on 14 January 2018. By this time the Hornets and Super Hornets had conducted over 2,700 sorties.

As of October 2018, the RAAF forces assigned to operations against ISIL had been reduced to a single aircraft. This involved alternating four month long KC-30 and Wedgetail deployments.

The final rotation of Air Task Group aircraft concluded in September 2020.

Commanders ATG 630

- Air Commodore Steve Roberton (September 2014 – January 2015)
- Air Commodore Glen Braz (January–July 2015)
- Air Commodore Stuart Bellingham (July 2015 – January 2016)
- Air Commodore Antony Martin (January–July 2016)
- Air Commodore Philip Gordon (July 2016 – January 2017)
- Air Commodore Mike Kitcher (January–July 2017)
- Air Commodore Terry van Haren (July 2017 – January 2018)

=== Exchange personnel ===
In August 2015, the Sydney Morning Herald reported that five RAAF exchange personnel embedded with the USAF 432d Operations Group had begun flying General Atomics MQ-9 Reapers over Syria.

== Army component ==
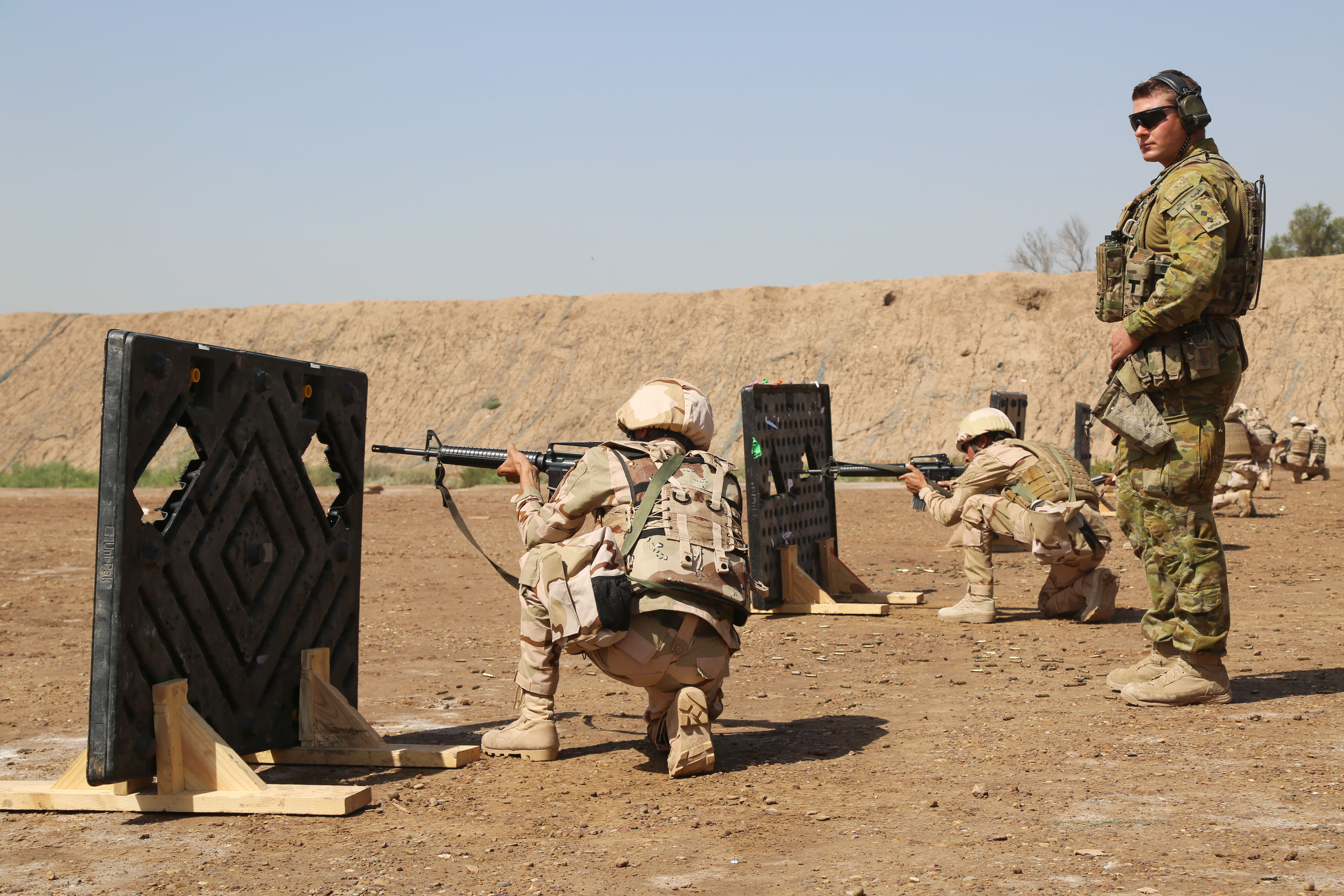
An Australian soldier assigned to Task Group Taji observing Iraqi soldiers during marksmanship training in April 2016

=== Special Operations Task Group ===
In September 2014, the Australian Army deployed a Special Operations Task Group (SOTG) of approximately 200 personnel to the United Arab Emirates in preparation for operations to advise and assist Iraqi Security Forces. The soldiers were expected to be deployed to Iraq when a legal framework covering their presence in the country was agreed between the Australian and Iraqi Governments. The majority of the initial rotation of the SOTG was made up of Charlie Company, 2nd Commando Regiment. The SOTG began moving into Iraq in early November. As the Iraqi Government would not agree to sign a status of forces agreement to prevent the soldiers from being prosecuted, they entered the country using diplomatic passports instead. Iraq has agreed to grant the soldiers immunity from local laws under this arrangement, though they will be prosecuted in Australia in the event of any misconduct.

The role of the SOTG is to provide training to Iraq's Counter-Terrorism Service, and personnel were stationed at the service's Counter-Terrorism Academy and Counter-Terrorism Training unit in January 2015, instructing in tactics, medical aid and counter improvised explosive device skills. The Counter-Terrorism Service includes two brigades of the Iraqi Special Operations Forces, which fought against ISIS during 2014 at the cost of heavy casualties. Members of the service have been accused of killing prisoners and committing human rights violations. SOTG personnel are required to report any human rights violations they become aware of.

The third SOTG rotation occurred in September 2015 with a reduced strength of 80 personnel.

The SOTG role is also to provide mission support with SOTG personnel stationed in Iraqi bases assisting Iraqi units which are deployed on operations through remote means. In December 2015, it was reported that SOTG personnel enabled more than 150 airstrikes in support of Counter Terrorism Service 1st Iraqi Special Operations Force Brigade's offensive liberating Ramadi resulting in the destruction of some 50 ISIL fighting positions, 16 heavy machine guns and numerous vehicle-borne improvised explosive devices.

In April 2016, it was disclosed that SOTG personnel are assisting at the "divisional level" embedded with senior Iraqi and Kurdish Peshmerga commanders. Earlier in November 2015, it had been reported that the Australian Government had authorised SOTG personnel to advise units at battalion size and larger in the field but the Iraqi Government had not provided approval.

=== Task Group Taji ===
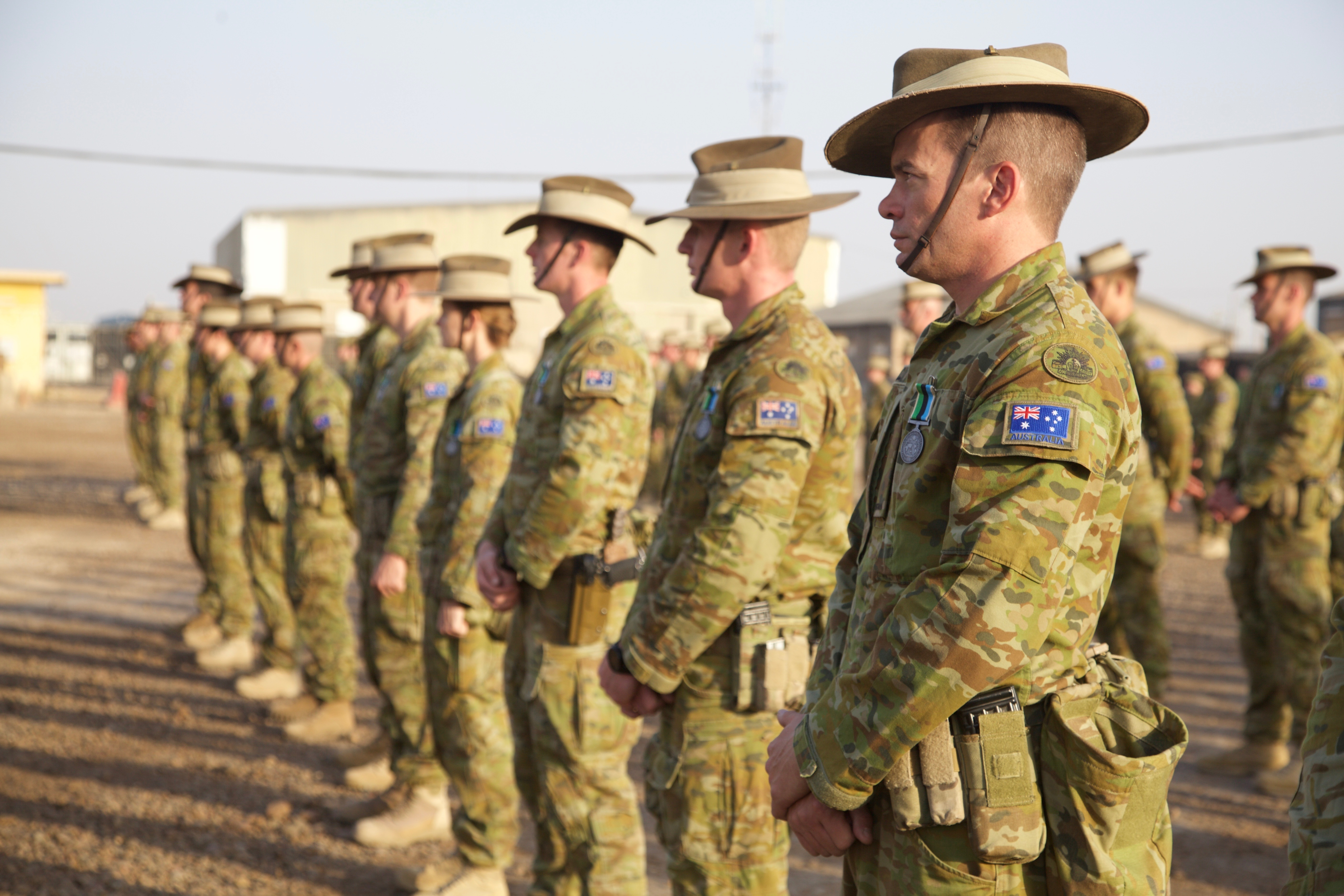
Members of Task Group Taji during a parade in November 2017

In April 2015, a 300-strong unit known as Task Group Taji (TGT) was deployed to Iraq as part of the coalition Building Partner Capacity mission. The task group consists of a training team with command, force protection and support elements, and is tasked with training the regular Iraqi Security Forces. A New Zealand force element of approximately another 100 personnel is integrated into the unit, forming a combined task group. The second rotation of Task Group Taji departed Australia in November 2015. The unit's departure was delayed due to problems gaining visas for the soldiers, and this caused the initial rotation's tour of duty to be extended by two weeks. The third rotation arrived in Iraq during May 2016.

In July 2016, it was announced that the Task Group would be expanding its role training paramilitary police agencies including Iraqi Federal and Local Police and border guard forces. In addition, the Task Group will be allowed to conduct training at other secure coalition training locations, as the need arises. Also, 15 personnel from the 16th Air Land Regiment will be deployed to provide a counter rocket, artillery and mortar (C-RAM) capability at Taji which is currently being provided by another Coalition member. By the end of June 2018 the Task Group had trained more than 34,000 Iraqi soldiers since their mission began in early 2015. With the deployment of the tenth rotation of TGT from Darwin, the Australian government announced that it was reducing troop numbers from 250 to 120 personnel as a result of improved capacity within the Iraqi Army's training establishments. By November 2019, over 45,000 Iraqi Army personnel had been trained, and over 2,500 Australians had served with TGT.

Task Group Taji concluded in June 2020, with the tenth rotation being the last.

Commanders

- Task Group Taji – 1 (Colonel Matt Galton), April 2015 – November 2015
- Task Group Taji – 2 (Colonel Gavin Keating), November 2015 – June 2016
- Task Group Taji – 3 (Colonel Andrew Lowe), June 2016 – December 2016
- Task Group Taji – 4 (Colonel Richard Vagg), December 2016 – June 2017
- Task Group Taji – 5 (Colonel Steve D'arcy), June 2017 – December 2017
- Task Group Taji – 6 (Colonel Robert Calhoun), December 2017 – June 2018
- Task Group Taji – 7 (Colonel Mick Say), June 2018 – December 2018
- Task Group Taji – 8 (Colonel Jason Groat), December 2018 – June 2019
- Task Group Taji – 9 (Colonel Michael Bassingthwaighte), June 2019 – December 2019
- Task Group Taji – 10 (Colonel Nick Foxall), December 2019 – June 2020

== Commanders ==
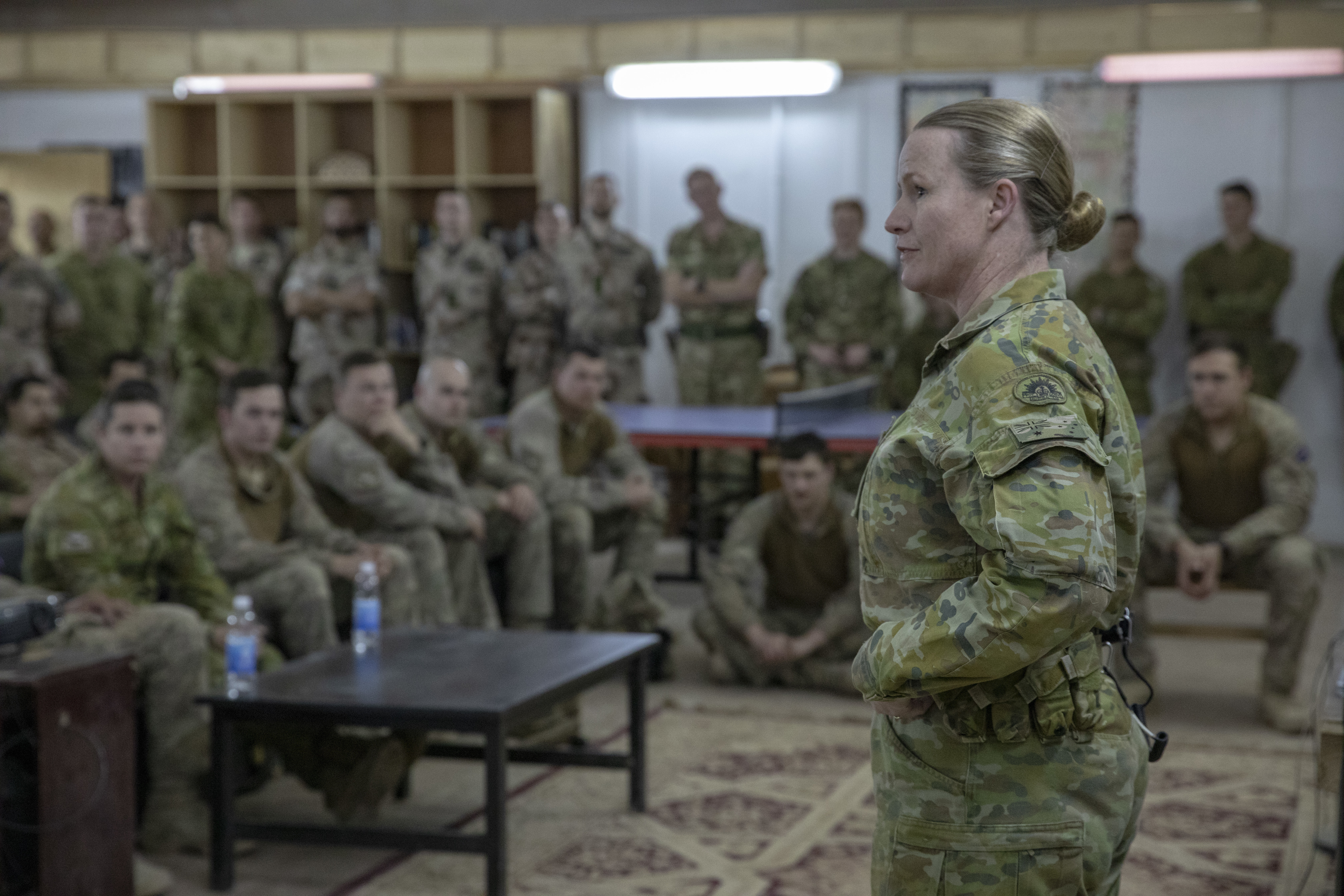
Major General Susan Coyle speaking to members of Task Force Taji in February 2020

Rank	Name	Postnominals	Service	Term began	Term ended	Ref
Commander Joint Task Force 633
Major General	Craig Orme	AM, CSC	Army	31 August 2014	12 December 2014	
Rear Admiral	Trevor Jones	AO, CSC	Navy	12 December 2014	28 January 2016	
Air Vice Marshal	Timothy Innes	CSC	Air Force	28 January 2016	23 January 2017	
Major General	John Frewen	AM	Army	23 January 2017	20 January 2018	
Rear Admiral	Jaimie Hatcher	AM	Navy	20 January 2018	20 January 2019	
Air Vice Marshal	Joe Iervasi	AM	Air Force	20 January 2019	28 June 2019	
Rear Admiral	Mark Hill	CSC	Navy	28 June 2019	18 January 2020	
Major General	Susan Coyle	CSC, DSM	Army	18 January 2020	26 November 2020	
Rear Admiral	Michael Rothwell	AM	Navy	26 November 2020	27 July 2021	
Air Commodore	David Paddison	CSC	Air Force	27 July 2021	7 December 2021	
Commander Headquarters Middle East
Group Captain	Jason Bowles		Air Force	7 December 2021	15 March 2022	
Colonel	Colin Blyth		Army	15 March 2022	20 September 2022	
Captain	Sean Andrews		Navy	20 September 2022	June 2023	
Colonel	Scottie Morris		Army	February 2024	9 December 2024	

== See also ==
- List of military operations involving Australia
- 2014 American-led intervention in Iraq
- Opération Chammal – French operation against ISIL
- Operation Shader – UK operation against ISIL
- Operation Impact – Canadian operation against ISIL
- Operation Inherent Resolve – US operation against ISIL
- Operation Martyr Yalçın – Turkish operation against ISIL
