= Glen Braz =

RAAF officer

- Born: 1969 (age 56–57)
- Military career
- Allegiance: Australia
- Branch: Royal Australian Air Force
- Service years: 1987–present
- Rank: Air Marshal
- Nickname: "Blitz"
- Commands: Chief of Joint Capabilities (2026–); Air Command (2023–26); Deputy Chief of Air Force (2023); Air Force Training Group RAAF (2017–19); No. 82 Wing RAAF (2015–17); Air Task Group 630 (2015); No. 1 Squadron RAAF (2008–11)
- Conflicts: Iraq War; War against the Islamic State
- Awards: Member of the Order of Australia; Conspicuous Service Cross; Distinguished Service Medal

Air Marshal Glen Edward Braz, AM, CSC, DSM (born 1969) is a senior officer in the Royal Australian Air Force (RAAF). He joined the RAAF through the Australian Defence Force Academy in 1987 and gained his pilot's wings in 1991. He has deployed on Operations Falconer and Okra to Iraq, and has commanded No. 1 Squadron RAAF (2008–11), Air Task Group 630 (2015), No. 82 Wing RAAF (2015–17) and Air Force Training Group RAAF (2017–19). He served as Deputy Chief of Air Force from January to June 2023, Air Commander Australia from June 2023 to April 2026, and was appointed Chief of Joint Capabilities in July 2026.

== RAAF career ==
Braz entered the Australian Defence Force Academy as a Royal Australian Air Force (RAAF) officer cadet in 1987. He graduated from the academy with a Bachelor of Science in physics in 1989 and, following flying training at No. 2 Flying Training School RAAF, graduated from No. 155 Pilot Course with his pilot's wings in June 1991. Following lead-in fighter training and conversion to the General Dynamics F-111C aircraft, Braz was posted to No. 1 Squadron RAAF at RAAF Base Amberley in Queensland. He qualified as a flying instructor in 1997, and subsequently instructed on the Pilatus PC-9 trainer aircraft and the Macchi MB-326H lead-in-fighter. Braz returned to No. 1 Squadron in 2001 as flight commander of weapons and reconnaissance and, in 2003, was posted to the Combined Air Operations Centre to support Operation Falconer, Australia's contribution to the invasion of Iraq.

Following his return to Australia, Braz was appointed executive officer of No. 6 Squadron RAAF at RAAF Base Amberley. In 2006, he was promoted to wing commander and graduated from the Australian Command and Staff College, before being appointed Deputy Director Air-Land Integration. He then became Deputy Director of the Super Hornet Transition Team, to assist in the introduction of the Boeing F/A-18F Super Hornet into Australian service, and in January 2009 was appointed commanding officer of No. 1 Squadron, the first RAAF unit—and the first squadron outside of the United States—to operate the Super Hornet. The first five Super Hornets were accepted by the RAAF in March 2010; Braz led the ferrying flight of the first set of aircraft from California to Australia, touching down at RAAF Base Amberley on 26 March. Braz relinquished command of the squadron in May 2011 and, in the Queen's Birthday Honours the following month, he was awarded the Conspicuous Service Cross in recognition of his "outstanding achievement" in command of the unit and for his role in the transition to the Super Hornet.

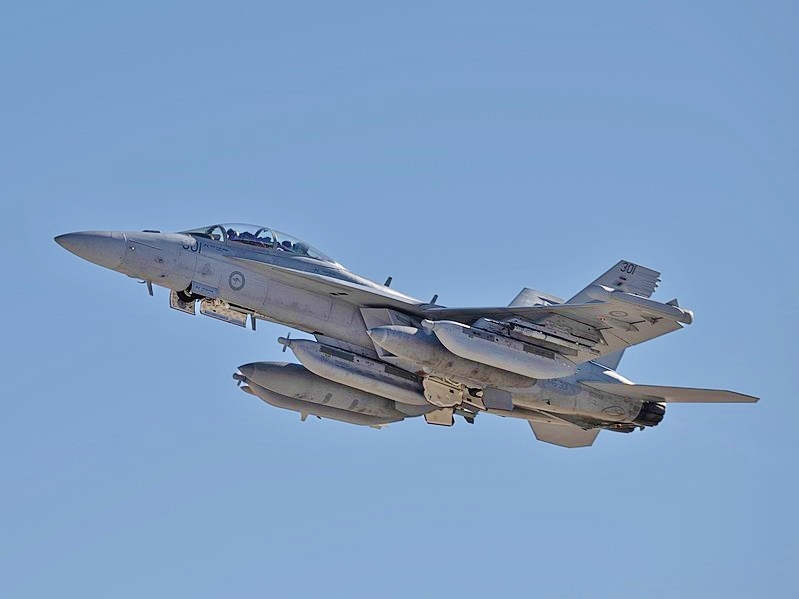
As Director of the EA-18G Growler Transition, Braz oversaw the introduction of the Boeing EA-18G Growler into RAAF service.

Braz was posted to the Australian Embassy in Washington, D.C. later in 2011, where he served as Air Staff Officer Plans and Operations. On his return to Australia, he was made Director of the EA-18G Growler Transition, to oversee the introduction of the Boeing EA-18G Growler into service with the RAAF. In January 2015, Braz deployed to Al Minhad Air Base in the United Arab Emirates as commander of the second rotation of Air Task Group 630 on Operation Okra. Braz was responsible for six F/A-18F Super Hornet strike aircraft (replaced by F/A-18A Hornets in March), a E-7A Wedgetail Airborne Early Warning and Control aircraft, one KC-30A Multi Role Tanker Transport and 400 personnel in conducting operations against the Islamic State. The role of the Air Task Group included carrying out airstrikes against ISIL, in support of Iraqi and Kurdish ground forces, and to provide humanitarian and logistic support to coalition partners. During the six-month deployment, the Air Task Group dropped 152,500 pounds (69,200 kg) of explosive ordnance in 277 airstrikes. Braz returned to Australia in July 2015 and, in the 2016 Queen's Birthday Honours, was awarded the Distinguished Service Medal for his "distinguished leadership" on Operation Okra.

Posted once again to RAAF Base Amberley, Braz was appointed to command No. 82 Wing RAAF from December 2015. He became commander Air Force Training Group RAAF in 2017 and, during his two-year tenure, Braz oversaw the replacement of the Pilatus PC-9 with the Pilatus PC-21 for flying training, the centralisation of initial officer aviation training at RAAF East Sale, and significant reforms to Professional Military Education in the RAAF, which included the establishment of the Air Academy and the Ground Academy. For his role in these reforms, and for his "exceptional performance" in enabling strategic capability and air combat sustainment, Braz was appointed a Member of the Order of Australia in the 2019 Australia Day Honours. He was appointed Director General Military Strategic Commitments in December 2019 and, on promotion to air vice-marshal in July 2020, he was seconded to the Australian Signals Directorate (ASD) as First Assistant Director-General, Expeditionary and Transnational Intelligence Division. His role was, in part, to command Australian Defence Force (ADF) personnel seconded to the ASD in support of cyber and signals intelligence, which was used by the ADF for defence and operational planning.

Braz briefly served as Deputy Chief of Air Force from January to June 2023, before succeeding Air Vice-Marshal Darren Goldie as Air Commander Australia. As Air Commander, Braz commanded the combat arm and oversaw the operational capability of the RAAF. Braz relinquished Air Command to Air Vice-Marshal Harvey Reynolds in April 2026 and, on 7 July that year, was promoted to air marshal and appointed Chief of Joint Capabilities.

== Personal life ==
Braz is married to Charnie, with whom he has two daughters.

Military offices
| Preceded by Lieutenant General Susan Coyle | Chief of Joint Capabilities; 2026–present | Incumbent |
| Preceded by Air Vice-Marshal Darren Goldie | Air Commander Australia; 2023–2026 | Succeeded by Air Vice-Marshal Harvey Reynolds |
| Preceded by Air Vice-Marshal Stephen Meredith | Deputy Chief of Air Force; January–June 2023 | Succeeded by Air Vice-Marshal Harvey Reynolds |
