= Susan Coyle =

Australian army officer (born 1970)

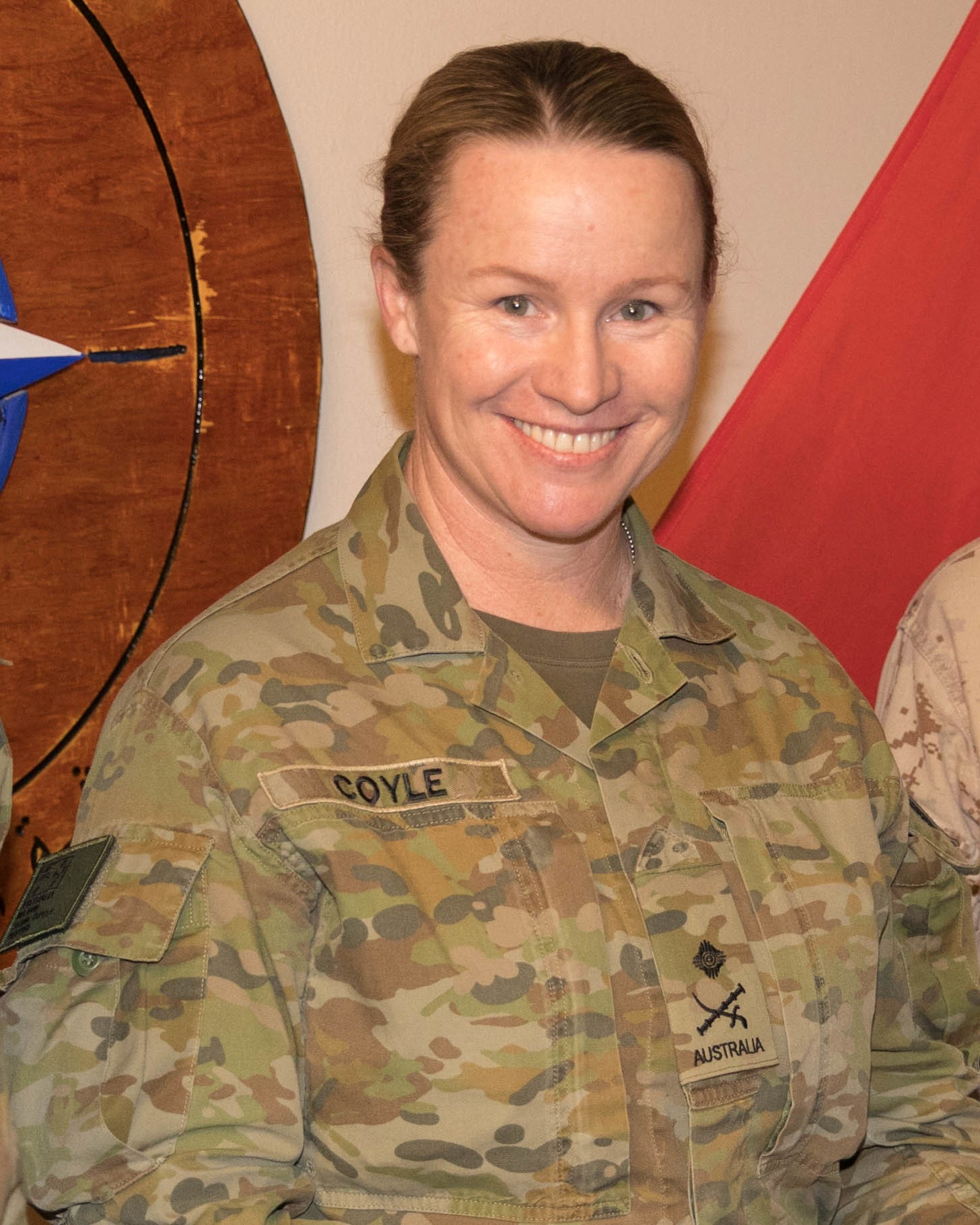
- Coyle in 2020
- Born: 21 May 1970 (age 56); Kyogle, New South Wales
- Military career
- Allegiance: Australia
- Branch: Australian Army
- Service years: 1987–present
- Rank: Lieutenant General
- Commands: Chief of Army (2026–); Chief of Joint Capabilities (2024–26); Forces Command (2022–24); Information Warfare Division (2021–22); Joint Task Force 633 (2020); 6th Combat Support Brigade (2017–19); Task Group Afghanistan (2015); 17th Signal Regiment (2009–10); 104th Signal Squadron (2003–04)
- Conflicts: United Nations Mission of Support to East Timor; Operation Anode; War in Afghanistan; War against the Islamic State
- Awards: Member of the Order of Australia; Conspicuous Service Cross; Distinguished Service Medal; Army Commendation Medal (United States)

Lieutenant General Susan May Coyle, AM, CSC, DSM (born 21 May 1970) is a senior officer in the Australian Army who has served as the chief of Army since July 2026. She joined the army as a reservist in 1987 and, following training at the Australian Defence Force Academy, was commissioned into the Royal Australian Corps of Signals in 1992. She has commanded the 104th Signal Squadron (2003–04), 17th Signal Regiment (2009–10), Task Group Afghanistan (2015) and the 6th Combat Support Brigade (2017–19), and has deployed on operations to East Timor, the Solomon Islands and Afghanistan. She was appointed commander, Joint Task Force 633, with responsibility for all Australian operations in the Middle East, from January to November 2020. She was the first woman to command the task force, which had oversight for 1,200 personnel under Operation Accordion. Coyle was head of information warfare from January 2021 to November 2022, commander, Forces Command from November 2022 to June 2024, and chief of joint capabilities from July 2024 to July 2026. She was appointed chief of Army on 8 July 2026, making her the first woman to lead a branch of the Australian Defence Force.

== Early life ==
Coyle was born on 21 May 1970 in Kyogle, a small town in the Northern Rivers region of New South Wales. Coyle has an elder sister, Alice, and three brothers. Alice joined the Australian Army Reserve and served in the Royal Australian Corps of Signals in the 1980s, which inspired Susan to a career in the Australian Army. During her final years at Oxley High School in Tamworth, Coyle was sponsored under the Australian Defence Force Academy (ADFA) scholarship scheme and joined the Australian Army Reserve herself, serving with the 12th/16th Hunter River Lancers. She graduated from Oxley High in 1988 and, the following January, entered ADFA as an Australian Army officer cadet.

== Military career ==
=== Early career ===
Coyle graduated from ADFA with a Bachelor of Science in 1991 and, following additional training at the Royal Military College, Duntroon, was commissioned into the Royal Australian Corps of Signals in 1992. Coyle's early career was marked by a variety of communications appointments, before she was selected as aide-de-camp to the Commander Australian Theatre from 1998 to 1999. She then received an exchange posting to the United States in 2000, serving as Brigade Satellite Engineer for the 11th Signal Brigade. Coyle was awarded the United States Army Commendation Medal for her performance in this role. She returned to Australia in 2001 and was posted to Headquarters Land Command as SO2 Communications. In 2002, she deployed on Operation Citadel, Australia's contribution to the United Nations Mission of Support to East Timor, as J6, the staff officer responsible for communications.

Coyle was posted to Darwin in 2003 as Officer Commanding 104th Signal Squadron. She led the squadron during a deployment to the Solomon Islands on Operation Anode in 2004, receiving a Chief of Joint Operations Command Commendation. She attended the Australian Command and Staff College in 2005, graduating with a Master of Management in Defence Studies from the affiliated University of Canberra. She served as Military Assistant to the Deputy Chief of Army in 2006 and, following staff postings with the Directorate of Officer Career Management – Army, was appointed to command the 17th Signal Regiment in Sydney from 2009 to 2010. In recognition of her "outstanding achievement" as a "commander and leader" of the regiment, Coyle was awarded the Conspicuous Service Cross in the 2011 Queen's Birthday Honours.

Coyle was next appointed to the directing staff of the Australian Command and Staff College—which included a three-month stint as Director of Studies – Land—before being posted as Director of Soldier Career Management – Army. In June 2014 Coyle, now a colonel, deployed to the Middle East as Deputy Commander – Afghanistan in Joint Task Force 633. As operations in the Middle East transitioned to a military intervention against the Islamic State, the Australian forces were reorganised and Coyle became Deputy Commander Joint Task Force 633. Towards the end of her twelve-month tour, she raised and was the inaugural commander of Task Group Afghanistan (Task Group 633.6). In recognition of her "distinguished leadership" and "exceptional drive, enthusiasm and commitment" in the Middle East, Coyle was awarded the Distinguished Service Medal in the 2017 Australia Day Honours.

On her return to Australia, Coyle was appointed chief of staff and Director Workforce and Behaviours within the First Principles Review, One Defence Implementation Office, before being seconded to the United States in 2016 to attend the United States Army War College. She graduated in 2017, leaving the college as a Distinguished Graduate with a Master of Strategic Studies. She also holds a Master in Organisational Development and Strategic Human Resource Management from the University of New England.

=== Senior commands ===
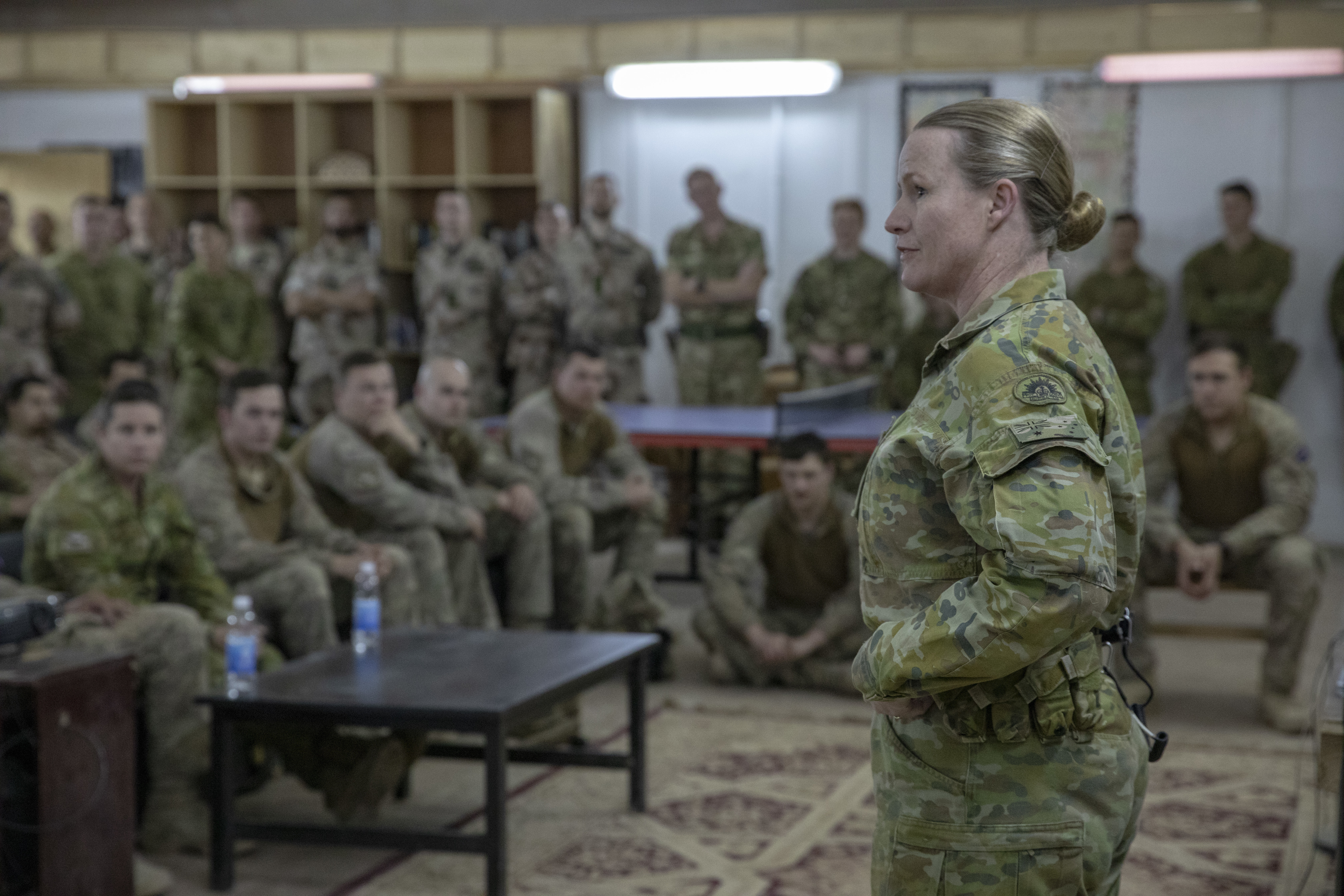
Major General Coyle speaking to members of Task Force Taji in Iraq in February 2020. At the time she was the commander of Australian forces in the Middle East, which included a contingent training the Iraqi Army at Taji.

Coyle was appointed to command the 6th Combat Support Brigade at Victoria Barracks, Sydney, in June 2017. She was also appointed Head of Corps for the Royal Australian Corps of Signals. The 6th Brigade oversaw intelligence, surveillance, target acquisition and reconnaissance units in the Australian Army to provide specialist combat support to land-based forces. Coyle relinquished command of the brigade in December 2019 and, promoted major general, redeployed to the Middle East as Commander Joint Task Force 633 on Operation Accordion from January to November 2020. Coyle was the first woman to command the task force, which was responsible for all Australian Defence Force operations and more than 1,200 personnel in the Middle East region. She relinquished command of the task force to Rear Admiral Michael Rothwell in November 2020 and, in recognition of her "exceptional performance of duty" in the role, was appointed a Member of the Order of Australia in the 2022 Australia Day Honours.

Following her return to Australia, Coyle was appointed Head Information Warfare in the Joint Capabilities Group in January 2021. She was next posted as Commander Forces Command in November 2022. In July 2024, Coyle was promoted to lieutenant general and appointed as Chief of Joint Capabilities. Joint Capabilities Group is responsible for cyber, information and space operations as well as a range of planning, training and logistics functions. This is a major command and made Coyle the first woman to lead one of the Australian Defence Force's war-fighting domains.

=== Chief of Army ===
On 13 April 2026 Coyle was announced as the next Chief of Army. She succeeded Lieutenant General Simon Stuart in the position on 8 July 2026 and, in doing so, became the first woman to lead a branch of the Australian Defence Force.

== Personal life ==
Coyle is married to Mark, an officer in the Australian Army's Royal Australian Engineers, and together they have three children. She enjoys musical theatre, reading, and travel.

Military offices
Preceded by Lieutenant General Simon Stuart	Chief of Army; 2026–present	Incumbent
Preceded by Lieutenant General John Frewen	Chief of Joint Capabilities; 2024–2026	Succeeded by Air Marshal Glen Braz
Preceded by Major General Matt Pearse	Commander Forces Command; 2022–2024	Succeeded by Brigadier Nathan Juchniewicz (Acting)
Preceded by Major General Marcus Thompson	Head Information Warfare; 2021–2022	Succeeded by Major General Ana Duncan as Head Cyber Warfare
Preceded by Rear Admiral Mark Hill	Commander Joint Task Force 633; January – November 2020	Succeeded by Rear Admiral Michael Rothwell
