= Peter Quinn (admiral) =

Royal Australian Navy admiral

- Military career
- Allegiance: Australia
- Branch: Royal Australian Navy
- Service years: 1983–2023
- Rank: Rear Admiral
- Commands: Navy Capability (2017–22); HMAS Anzac (2009–10); HMAS Sydney (2003–06)
- Conflicts: International Force East Timor
- Awards: Officer of the Order of Australia; Conspicuous Service Cross

Rear Admiral Peter Michael Quinn, AO, CSC is a retired senior officer of the Royal Australian Navy. He has served as Head of Navy Capability from 2017 to 2022.

== Naval career ==
Quinn joined the Royal Australian Navy (RAN) in 1983. His seagoing role has been as a warfare officer on frigates and destroyers in the RAN and on exchange with the Royal Canadian Navy. He commanded HMAS Sydney from 2003 to 2006 and HMAS Anzac 2009 to 2010. Shore appointments included Officer in Charge Maritime Warfare Training Group, Head of Combat Systems Training, Director Maritime Combat Development, Director General Navy Capability Transition and Sustainment, Head Joint Capability Coordination, Head Joint Capability Management and Integration, Head Force Integration and Head Navy Capability.

Quinn was awarded a Conspicuous Service Cross for outstanding achievement as the Commanding Officer of HMAS Sydney in the 2007 Australia Day Honours, and appointed a Member of the Order of Australia in the 2018 Queen's Birthday Honours for exceptional service to the Royal Australian Navy and Defence in senior management. He was promoted to Officer of the Order of Australia in the 2023 Australia Day Honours.

Military offices
Preceded by Rear Admiral Jonathan Mead	Head of Navy Capability; 2017–2022	Succeeded by Rear Admiral Stephen Hughes
