= Space Command (Australia) =

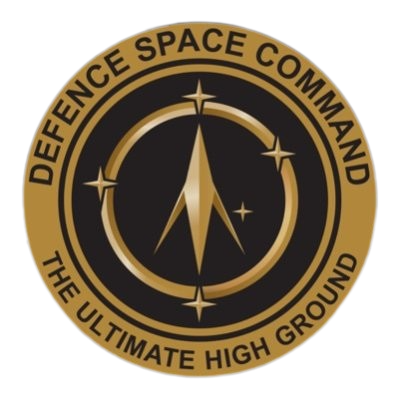
- Insignia of Space Command
- Active: 18 January 2022 - present
- Country: Australia
- Branch: Joint Capabilities Group
- Type: Joint space command
- Role: Space operations
- Motto: "The Ultimate High Ground"

Commanders
- Commander Space Command: Major General Greg Novak

Space Command (SPACECOMD), (formerly Defence Space Command (DSpC)), is an Australian Defence Force integrated tri-service headquarters in Joint Capabilities Group (JCG) tasked with conducting strategic space planning, as well as design, construction, maintenance and operation of space facilities. Space Command operates with personnel from the Royal Australian Navy, Australian Army and Royal Australian Air Force (RAAF) together with the Australian Public Service reporting to the Chief of Joint Capabilities. As of 2024, the Commander (COMD SPACECOMD) is Major General Greg Novak.

Space Command was initially formed under the RAAF in January 2022, and reorganised under JCG in July 2023 in response to the Australian Defence Strategic Review No. 1 Space Surveillance Unit, which operates a space surveillance radar and telescope in partnership with the United States Space Force, was transferred from the RAAF to Space Command in July 2023.

== Commander Space Command ==
Rank	Name	Postnominals	Term began	Term ended	Notes
Air Vice-Marshal	Catherine Roberts	AO, CSC	18 January 2022	13 December 2023	
Major General	Gregory Novak	AM	13 December 2023	Incumbent	

== See also ==
- Space command
