= Jonathan Mead =

Royal Australian Navy admiral

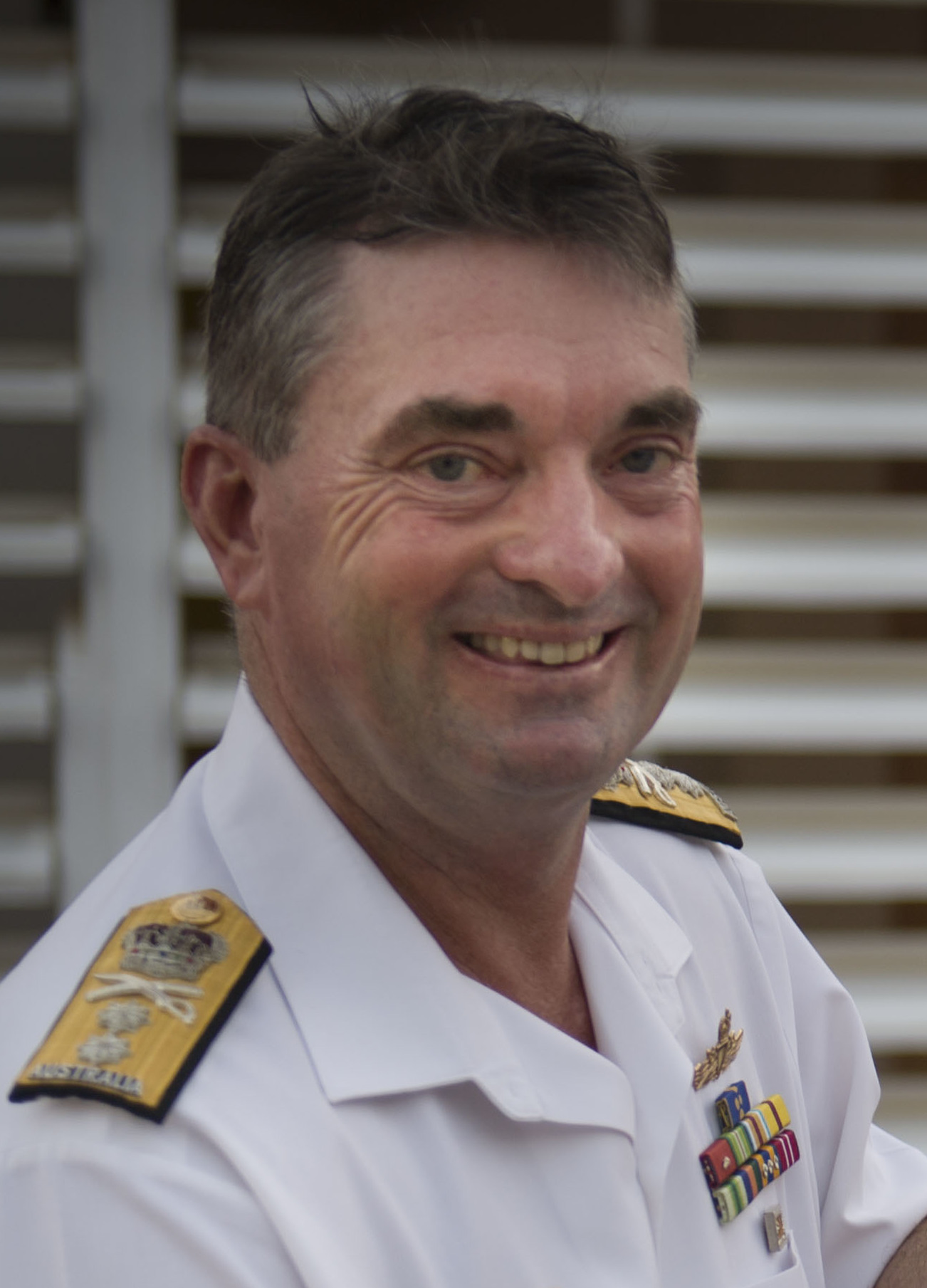
- Vice Admiral Jonathan Mead in 2018
- Born: 3 November 1964 (age 61); Melbourne, Victoria
- Military career
- Allegiance: Australia
- Branch: Royal Australian Navy
- Service years: 1984–present
- Rank: Vice Admiral
- Commands: Australian Submarine Agency (2023–); Nuclear-Powered Submarine Task Force (2021–23); Chief of Joint Capabilities (2020–21); Fleet Command (2018–20); Head of Navy Capability (2015–17); Combined Task Force 150 (2011–12); HMAS Parramatta (2005–07)
- Conflicts: Iraq War; War in Afghanistan
- Awards: Officer of the Order of Australia; Commendation for Distinguished Service; Commander of the Legion of Merit (United States)

Vice Admiral Jonathan Dallas Mead, AO (born 3 November 1964) is a senior officer in the Royal Australian Navy. He joined the navy via the Royal Australian Naval College at HMAS Creswell in 1984, and spent his early career with the Clearance Diving Branch before training as a Principal Warfare Officer. He captained HMAS Parramatta on operations in the Persian Gulf from 2006 to 2007 during the Iraq War and commanded Combined Task Force 150, overseeing maritime counter-terrorism operations around the Arabian Peninsula and Horn of Africa, from 2011 to 2012. He served as Head of Navy Capability from 2015 to 2017, Commander Australian Fleet from 2018 to 2020, Chief of Joint Capabilities from 2020 to 2021, and was appointed Chief of the Nuclear-Powered Submarine Task Force in September 2021.

== Early life ==
Jonathan Dallas Mead was born in Melbourne, Victoria, on 3 November 1964 to Dallas Charles Cardiff Mead and Joan Mary Reidy. His father had served in the Royal Australian Air Force during the Second World War, rising to the rank of flight sergeant, while a grandfather had fought on the Western Front with the Australian Imperial Force in the First World War.

Mead was educated at St Bede's College, a Catholic secondary school in the inner Melbourne suburb of Mentone. He was an active sportsman who particularly excelled at water sports. As a youth he would explore the wreck of HMAS Cerberus, a breastwork monitor sunk as a breakwater off Half Moon Bay in Port Phillip.

== Naval career ==
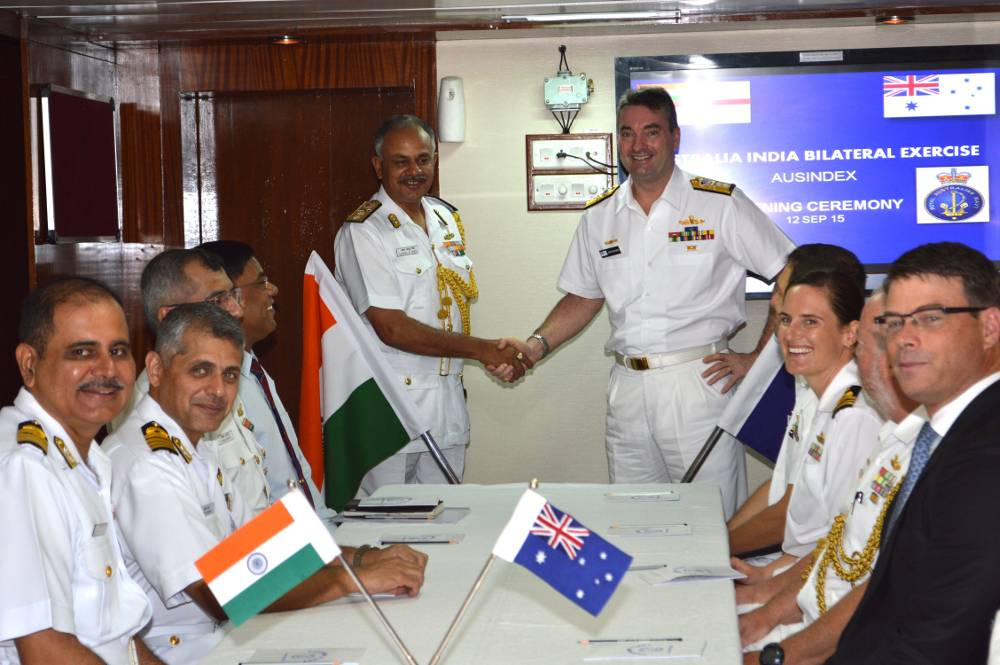
Mead (standing, right) shaking hands with Rear Admiral Ajendra Bahadur Singh during exercise AUSINDEX-15 in September 2015.

Mead was commissioned a midshipman and entered the Royal Australian Naval College at HMAS Creswell for junior officer training on 16 January 1984. He was classmates with fellow future admirals Stuart Mayer, Michael Noonan, and Greg Sammut. Mead graduated from the college as a sub-lieutenant and with a Diploma of Applied Science in 1986 and undertook further training in bridge watchkeeping and clearance diving, specialising in Mine Warfare and Explosive Ordnance Disposal. Mead later described his service with the Clearance Diving Branch, culminating with his appointment as executive officer of Clearance Diving Team One, as "some of the happiest days of my career."

Seeking to enhance his future career prospects, Mead trained as a Principal Warfare Officer specialising in Anti-Submarine Warfare. He also read for a Master of Arts in International Relations at Deakin University and, later, a Master of Management at the University of Canberra. A series of seagoing appointments followed, including as Anti-Submarine Warfare Officer aboard HMAS Melbourne and in HMAS Arunta, and as Fleet Anti-Submarine Warfare Officer. Mead next returned to HMAS Arunta as executive officer. During his time in the ship, Arunta deployed as part of Operation Relex to turn back vessels suspected of unauthorised entry to northern Australian waters.

Mead submitted the thesis for his Doctor of Philosophy, titled "The Australia–Indonesia Security Relationship", to the School of International and Political Studies at Deakin University in 2004. The following year, by now a commander, he was appointed commanding officer of the Anzac-class frigate HMAS Parramatta. The frigate deployed to the Persian Gulf as part of Operation Catalyst, Australia's contribution to the Iraq War, in October 2005. During the six-month deployment, Parramatta's crew carried out 186 vessel boardings and security patrols and were involved in training other coalition and Iraqi warships. Parramatta returned to Sydney in April 2006. Mead and his crew were subsequently recognised with a Meritorious Unit Citation for Parramatta's "meritorious operational service" in the Persian Gulf, while Mead was additionally honoured with appointment as a Member of the Order of Australia in the 2007 Australia Day Honours for his "exceptional service in warlike operations".

In 2007, Mead completed a course of study at India's National Defence College in New Delhi and, now a captain, was appointed Australia's Defence Advisor to India, Sri Lanka and South Africa. During this time Mead authored Indian National Security: Misguided Men and Guided Missiles, published with KW Publishers in 2010. Following promotion to commodore in July 2011, he deployed to the Middle East from October as commander Combined Task Force 150. Based in Bahrain, Mead's multinational naval task force was responsible for maritime counter-terrorism operations around the Arabian Peninsula and Horn of Africa. He returned to Australia in April 2012 as Commander Surface Force in Fleet Headquarters. For his "distinguished performance" as a "highly effective commander" in the Middle East, Mead was awarded a Commendation for Distinguished Service in the 2013 Queen's Birthday Honours.

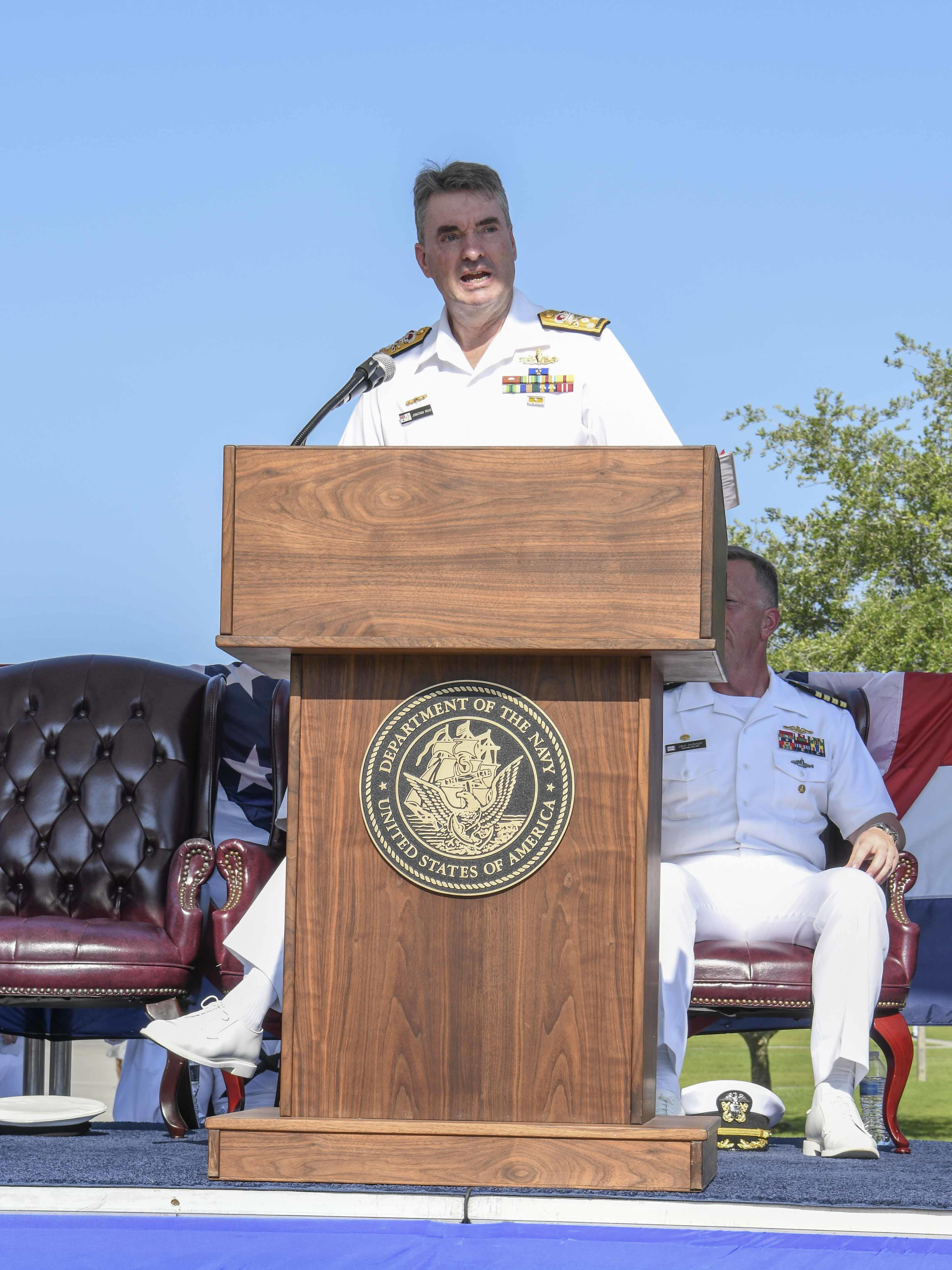
Speaking at the US Naval Nuclear Power School graduation, 2023

Promoted to rear admiral, Mead was appointed Head of Navy Capability in January 2015. In this role he was responsible for the development of present and future capability within the Royal Australian Navy, which included overseeing the lifecycle of projects and programs from initial concept through to disposal. After three years managing capability, Mead succeeded Rear Admiral Stuart Mayer as Commander Australian Fleet on 19 January 2018. In the 2020 Queen's Birthday Honours, Mead was advanced to Officer of the Order of Australia in recognition of his "distinguished service to the Royal Australian Navy in senior management and command roles." Mead handed over command of the Australian Fleet to Rear Admiral Mark Hammond on 17 November 2020.

Mead was promoted vice admiral and appointed Chief of Joint Capabilities in November 2020. He handed over Joint Capabilities to Lieutenant General John Frewen in September 2021 and was subsequently appointed Chief of the Nuclear-Powered Submarine Task Force, responsible for overseeing Australia's acquisition of submarines with nuclear propulsion. On 1 July 2023 the task force was replaced by the Australian Submarine Agency and Mead was appointed the inaugural director-general.

Mead was appointed a Commander of the Legion of Merit by the United States on 8 February 2024 for his "service as the Chief of the Royal Australian Navy Nuclear Powered Submarine Task Force and his leadership role in the AUKUS trilateral security partnership."

== Personal life ==
Mead has been married to Frances since 23 May 1992. The couple have two sons. Mead is a board member of the Australian National Maritime Museum and the Young Endeavour Youth Scheme.

Military offices
Preceded by Air Marshal Warren McDonald	Chief of Joint Capabilities; 2020–2021	Succeeded by Lieutenant General John Frewen
Preceded by Rear Admiral Stuart Mayer	Commander Australian Fleet; 2018–2020	Succeeded by Rear Admiral Mark Hammond
Preceded by Rear Admiral Mark Campbell	Head of Navy Capability; 2015–2017	Succeeded by Rear Admiral Peter Quinn
