= Darren Goldie =

Australian air force officer

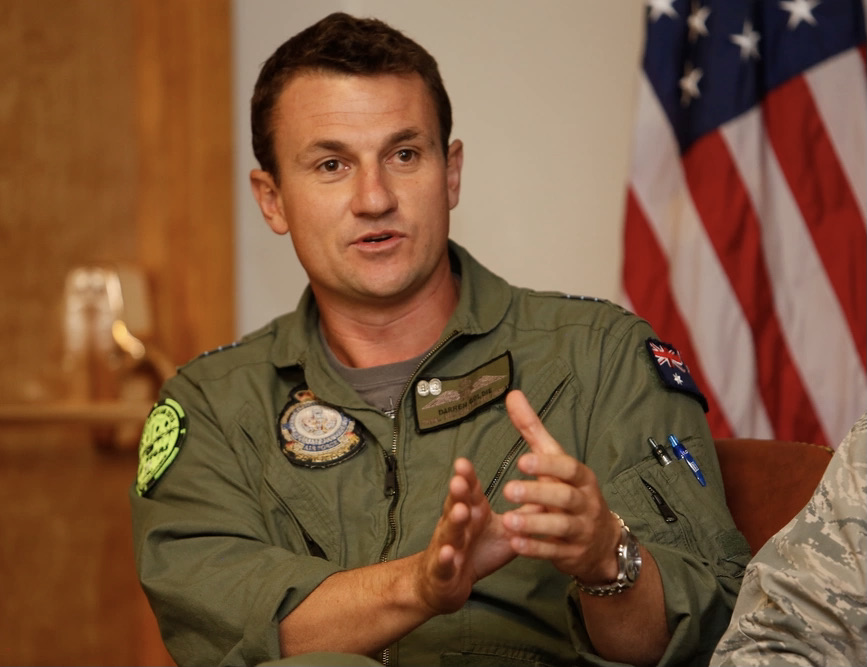
- Wing Commander Goldie at Nellis Air Force Base, USA in 2015
- Born: 1975 (age 50–51)
- Military career
- Allegiance: Australia
- Branch: Royal Australian Air Force
- Service years: 1993–2024
- Rank: Air Marshal
- Commands: National Cyber Security Coordinator (2023); Air Command (2022–23); No. 92 Wing RAAF (2017–18); No. 37 Squadron RAAF (2012–15)
- Conflicts: Iraq War; War in Afghanistan
- Awards: Member of the Order of Australia; Conspicuous Service Cross

Air Marshal Darren James Goldie, AM, CSC (born 1975) is a retired senior officer of the Royal Australian Air Force (RAAF). He joined the RAAF through the Australian Defence Force Academy in 1993 and gained his pilot's wings in 1997. He deployed on operations to East Timor, Iraq and Afghanistan, and commanded No. 37 Squadron RAAF (2012–15) and No. 92 Wing RAAF (2017–18). He was Air Commander Australia from April 2022 to June 2023, and served as Australia's inaugural National Cyber Security Coordinator from July to November 2023.

== Early life ==
Goldie was raised on the Gold Coast of Queensland and educated at The Southport School, where he was a member of the Australian Air Force Cadets.

== RAAF career ==
Goldie entered the Australian Defence Force Academy as a Royal Australian Air Force (RAAF) officer cadet in 1993. He graduated from the academy with a Bachelor of Science in Computer Studies in 1995 and was posted for flying training, gaining his pilot's wings in 1997 on the same course as fellow future air marshal, Stephen Chappell. He was then appointed to No. 37 Squadron RAAF, operating the Lockheed C-130 Hercules, and flew on operations in East Timor. After serving as aide-de-camp to the Chief of the Defence Force from 2000 to 2001, Goldie returned to No. 37 Squadron as a flight commander and served on operations in Iraq and Afghanistan.

Goldie was appointed the Air Force Pilot HR Manager in 2007 and then, in 2008, became Staff Officer VIP Operations, responsible for the air transport of royalty, visiting dignitaries and government officials, including the prime minister and governor-general. For his "outstanding achievement" in this role, Goldie was awarded the Conspicuous Service Cross in the 2012 Australia Day Honours. He graduated with a Masters of Management from the University of New South Wales in 2010 and a Masters of Strategic Studies from the USAF Air War College in 2012, before being appointed commanding officer of No. 37 Squadron in July that year. Goldie's squadron oversaw 650 personnel and a fleet of twelve C-130J Hercules aircraft, which were engaged in domestic and overseas operations and included a detachment posted to the Middle East Area of Operations. During his time in command, No. 37 Squadron was awarded the Gloucester Cup as the "most proficient flying Squadron" in the RAAF. In January 2013, as pilot of a C-130J, Goldie was involved in the successful search-and-rescue of French yachtsman Alain Delord, who was located approximately 500 nautical miles (930 km) south of Tasmania. Goldie and his crew received a Chief of Joint Operations Gold Commendation for their role in the rescue. In recognition of both his command of the squadron and "exceptional service ... in airlift operations", Goldie was appointed a Member of the Order of Australia in the 2015 Australia Day Honours.

Goldie was made Director Military Strategic Commitments in 2015, Officer Commanding No. 92 Wing RAAF in 2017, and Director General Air Combat Capability in 2018. In 2020 he was seconded to the Department of the Prime Minister and Cabinet, serving as Assistant Secretary of Global Interests in the International Division and providing strategic advice on foreign policy to the Australian government. Goldie returned to the RAAF in 2022 and succeeded Air Vice-Marshal Joe Iervasi as Air Commander Australia that April, with responsibility for the training and operational preparedness of 12,000 personnel in the operational arm of the RAAF. In this role, Goldie was included on a list of Australians banned from travelling to Russia because for their ties to the Australian government. Goldie handed over Air Command to Air Vice-Marshal Glen Braz in June 2023.

In July 2023 Goldie was promoted to air marshal and appointed as Australia's inaugural National Cyber Security Coordinator. The role was created in the Department of Home Affairs to oversee Australia's cyber security policy and to coordinate the government's strategic response to cyber security threats. Goldie served in the role for only four months. He was recalled to the Department of Defence in November "to deal with a workplace matter" arising from "a complaint concerning [Goldie's] alleged past behaviour" in the RAAF. Goldie was formally replaced by Lieutenant General Michelle McGuinness in February 2024, and he officially retired from the RAAF that May.

== Post-military career ==
Goldie is currently a national security consultant, and remains active as a public commentator on defence and national security issues.

== Personal life ==
Goldie is married to Kirsty, a nurse in the RAAF, and has two adult children.

Military offices
New title	National Cyber Security Coordinator; 2023	Succeeded by Lieutenant General Michelle McGuinness
Preceded by Air Vice-Marshal Joe Iervasi	Air Commander Australia; 2022–2023	Succeeded by Air Vice-Marshal Glen Braz
