= Joint Capabilities Group =

- Active: July 2017 – present
- Country: Australia
- Part of: Australian Defence Force

Commanders
- Chief of Joint Capabilities: Lieutenant General Susan Coyle

The Joint Capabilities Group (JCG) is a war-fighting organisation of the Australian Defence Force responsible for space, cyber, and logistics capabilities. The group was formed in July 2017. It is currently led by the Chief of Joint Capabilities Lieutenant General Susan Coyle.

In 2023, the Albanese Government's Defence Strategic Review (DSR) recommended that Defence Space Command (DSpC) be moved into JCG by 1 July 2023. On 1 July 2023, DSpC moved into JCG from the Royal Australian Air Force.

== Structure ==
As of August 2024, the JCG includes:

- The Australian Civil-Military Centre.
- Cyber Warfare Division.
- Defence SIGINT and Cyber Command (DSCC).
- Space Command
  - No. 1 Space Surveillance Unit
- ICT Operations Division (ICTOD).
- Joint Capabilities Division (JCD).
- Joint Logistics Command.
- Military Strategic Effects Branch.
