= Michelle McGuinness =

Australian Army officer

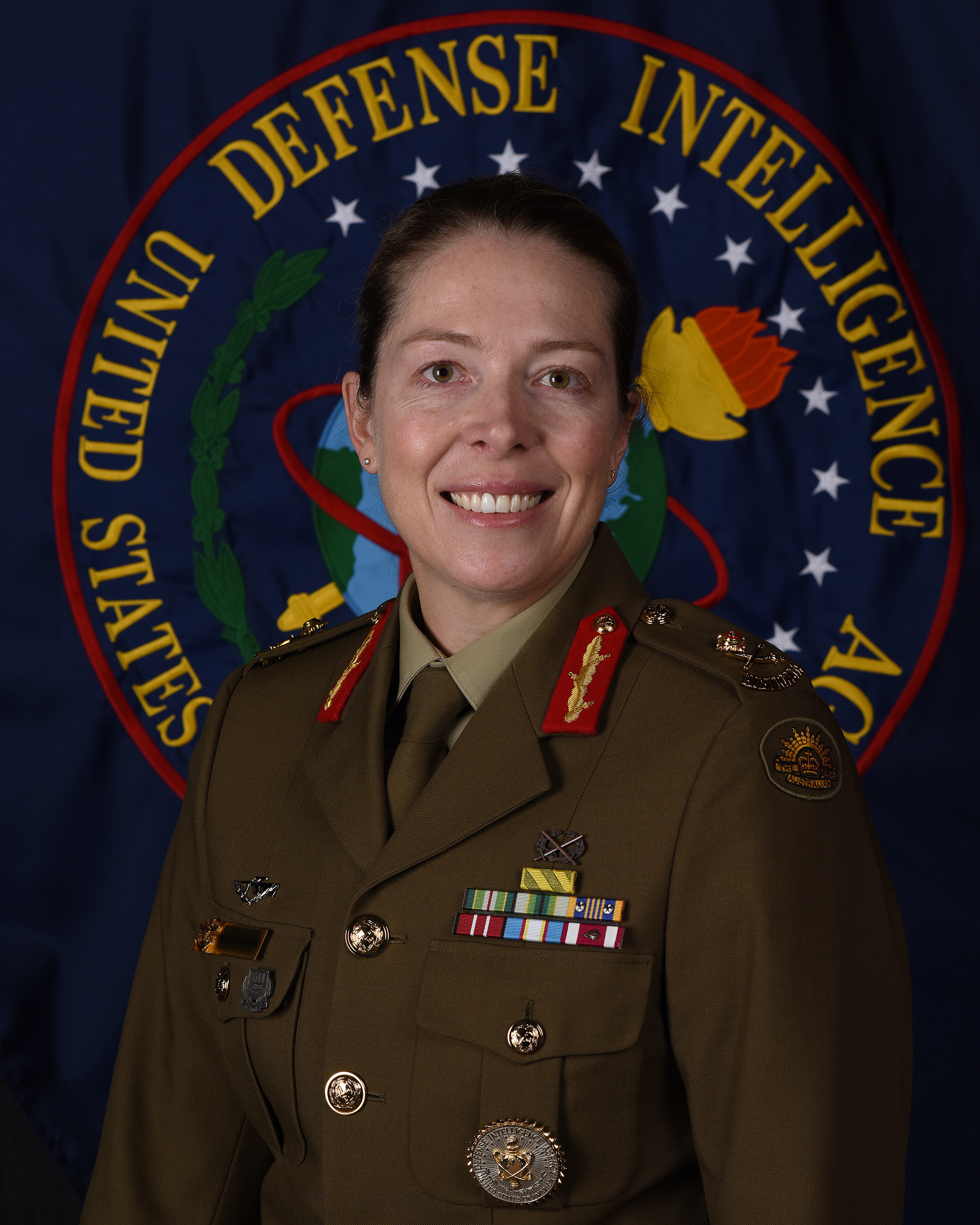
- McGuinness in 2021
- Military career
- Allegiance: Australia
- Branch: Australian Army
- Service years: 1994–present
- Rank: Lieutenant General
- Conflicts: United Nations Transitional Administration in East Timor
- Awards: Conspicuous Service Cross; Officer of the Legion of Merit (United States); Meritorious Service Medal (2; United States)

Lieutenant General Michelle Irene McGuinness, CSC is a senior officer in the Australian Army. She joined the army via the Australian Defence Force Academy (ADFA) in 1994 and was commissioned into the Australian Army Intelligence Corps on graduating from the Royal Military College, Duntroon, in 1997. She has served as commanding officer/chief instructor at ADFA (2014–15), Assistant Military Attaché to the United States (2015–17), Director General Counterproliferation and Terrorism (2019–21), and deputy director for Commonwealth Integration in the United States Defense Intelligence Agency (2021–24). McGuinness was promoted to lieutenant general and appointed National Cyber Security Coordinator in February 2024.

== Military career ==
McGuinness entered the Australian Defence Force Academy (ADFA) as an Australian Army officer cadet in 1994. She graduated from ADFA with a Bachelor of Arts in politics and Bahasa Indonesian in 1996 and, following further training at the Royal Military College, Duntroon, was commissioned into the Australian Army Intelligence Corps in 1997. Her early career included leading and managing human intelligence, interrogation, and exploitation intelligence operations, and deployments to East Timor and the Solomon Islands. In 2005, McGuinness was posted to Washington, D.C. as an intelligence capability liaison officer for the Defence Intelligence Organisation and, in 2006, she was seconded to the United States Joint Improvised Explosive Device Defeat Organization (JIEDDO) as an integrated intelligence officer. Her work with the JIEDDO directly supported operations in Afghanistan and Iraq, and she was twice awarded the Meritorious Service Medal for her work with United States forces.

McGuinness returned to ADFA as the operations officer in 2008 and, the following year, graduated from the Australian Command and Staff College with a Master of Arts in strategy and policy. Following postings to Australian Army Headquarters, McGuinness was appointed commanding officer/chief instructor at ADFA in 2014 and then Assistant Military Attaché in Washington, D.C. in December 2015. In recognition of her "outstanding leadership" and "superb contribution" in these two roles, McGuinness was awarded the Conspicuous Service Cross in the 2018 Australia Day Honours. Later that year, she graduated with a Master of International Public Policy from the Johns Hopkins University School of Advanced International Studies and, on her return to Australia, was appointed chief of staff to the Chief of the Defence Force, General Angus Campbell.

McGuinness became Director General Counterproliferation and Terrorism in the Defence Intelligence Organisation in 2019. In this role, she was responsible for leading interagency intelligence efforts to support government counterproliferation operations. In January 2021, she returned to the United States as deputy director for Commonwealth Integration in the Defense Intelligence Agency. McGuinness's role was to help facilitate collaboration and intelligence sharing between the Defense Intelligence Agency and key international partners. She was awarded the United States Legion of Merit and the Joint Meritorious Unit Award in recognition of her achievements in the role. McGinness returned to Australia in early 2024 and, on 26 February, she was promoted to lieutenant general and appointed National Cyber Security Coordinator. The position had been created, under the Department of Home Affairs, in 2023 to oversee Australia's cyber security policy and to coordinate the Australian government's strategic response to cyber security threats.

Military offices
Preceded by Air Marshal Darren Goldie	National Cyber Security Coordinator; 2024–present	Incumbent
