= Warren McDonald (RAAF officer) =

- Born: 4 February 1963 (age 63); Hay, New South Wales
- Military career
- Allegiance: Australia
- Branch: Royal Australian Air Force
- Service years: c. 1979–2021
- Rank: Air Marshal
- Commands: Chief of Joint Capabilities (2017–20); Deputy Chief of Air Force (2015–17); Air Mobility Group (2013–15); No. 92 Wing (2009–11); No. 11 Squadron (2007–09)
- Conflicts: War in Afghanistan; Iraq War
- Awards: Officer of the Order of Australia; Conspicuous Service Cross

Air Marshal Warren George McDonald, AO, CSC (born 4 February 1963) is a retired senior officer of the Royal Australian Air Force (RAAF). He joined the RAAF as a 15-year-old apprentice and, in 1989, underwent pilot training. A series of squadron and staff postings in Australia, Canada and Malaysia followed, before he was appointed to command No. 11 Squadron (2007–09), No. 92 Wing (2009–11) and Air Mobility Group (2013–15). He was Deputy Chief of Air Force from July 2015 to May 2017 and the inaugural Chief of Joint Capabilities from July 2017 to November 2020.

== Early and personal life ==
Warren George McDonald was born in Hay, New South Wales, on 4 February 1963 to George and Shirley McDonald. At 15, he joined the Royal Australian Air Force as an apprentice motor transport fitter.

== RAAF career ==
After ten years as an enlisted airman, McDonald was accepted for pilot training and commissioned as an officer in 1989. He was first posted to No. 11 Squadron flying the Lockheed P-3 Orion then, in 1993, was sent to Canada on exchange with No. 415 Squadron RCAF, equipped with the Lockheed CP-140 Aurora. Following his return to Australia in 1996, McDonald occupied a series of squadron and staff postings. He was appointed to No. 10 Squadron, served with the Maritime Test and Evaluation Unit within No. 92 Wing (during which he helped to introduce the Lockheed AP-3C Orion into service) and, in 2001, was promoted squadron leader and returned to No. 10 Squadron as a flight commander. This was followed, in 2002, by a three-year appointment in command of No. 92 Wing's Detachment Alpha at RMAF Butterworth in Malaysia.

McDonald attended the Australian Command and Staff College in 2005 and, promoted wing commander, was posted as deputy director of Project Air 7000 Phase 1. Appointed to command No. 11 Squadron in 2007, he was awarded the Conspicuous Service Cross in the 2009 Queen's Birthday Honours in recognition of his two years of "outstanding achievement" in the role. Promoted group captain, McDonald assumed command of No. 92 Wing in 2009 and, in October 2011, was posted to the Middle East as Air Component Commander for Joint Task Force 633 in support of Operation Slipper, Australia's contribution to the War in Afghanistan.

McDonald was promoted air commodore in May 2012 and served as Director General Capability Planning – Air Force (2012–13), commander Air Mobility Group (2013–15), and Deputy Chief of Air Force from July 2015 as an air vice marshal. He was appointed a Member of the Order of Australia in the 2015 Queen's Birthday Honours for "exceptional performance of duty" in these appointments. Following a reorganisation of Australian Defence Force headquarters, McDonald was appointed the inaugural Chief of Joint Capabilities on 1 July 2017 with responsibility for the Joint Capabilities Group, which includes the Australian Defence College, Joint Health Command, Joint Logistics Command, and the Information Warfare Division. In December 2018, McDonald was promoted air marshal with effect from 28 January 2019. According to Minister for Defence Christopher Pyne, the raising of McDonald and the Chief of Joint Capabilities billet to three-star rank "was a reflection of the importance the position held in Defence", particularly since the chief is "the capability manager for the fifth domain of war—information warfare".

In the 2020 Queen's Birthday Honours, McDonald was appointed an Officer of the Order of Australia in recognition of his "distinguished service in responsible positions as Deputy Chief of Air Force and Chief of Joint Capabilities." He was succeeded as Chief of Joint Capabilities by Vice Admiral Jonathan Mead in November 2020.

== Notes ==
Military offices
New title	Chief of Joint Capabilities; 2017–2020	Succeeded by Vice Admiral Jonathan Mead
Preceded by Air Vice Marshal Leo Davies	Deputy Chief of Air Force; 2015–2017	Succeeded by Air Vice Marshal Gavin Turnbull
