= John Frewen (general) =

Australian Army officer

Lieutenant General John Frewen AO DSC
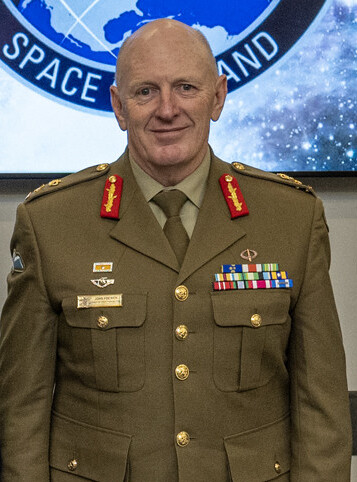
- Frewen in 2024
- Military career
- Allegiance: Australia
- Branch: Australian Army
- Service years: 1983–2024
- Rank: Lieutenant General
- Commands: Chief of Joint Capabilities (2021–24); National COVID Vaccine Taskforce (2021–22); Joint Task Force 633 (2017–18); Military Strategic Commitments Division (2014–16); 1st Brigade (2012–14); Combined Task Force 635 (2003); 2nd Battalion, Royal Australian Regiment (2003–04)
- Conflicts: UN Assistance Mission for Rwanda; Operation Anode; War in Afghanistan; War against the Islamic State; Operation Okra
- Awards: Officer of the Order of Australia; Distinguished Service Cross; Meritorious Service Medal (United States)

Lieutenant General John James Frewen is a retired senior officer of the Australian Army. He joined the army via the Royal Military College, Duntroon and was commissioned into the Royal Australian Infantry Corps in 1986. He has commanded the 2nd Battalion, Royal Australian Regiment (2003–04), Combined Task Force 635 (2003), the 1st Brigade (2012–14), Military Strategic Commitments Division (2014–16) and Joint Task Force 633 (2017–18), and deployed on operations to Rwanda, the Solomon Islands and Afghanistan. He was appointed Principal Deputy Director-General of the Australian Signals Directorate in March 2018, and Coordinator General of the National COVID Vaccine Taskforce in June 2021. He was Chief of Joint Capabilities from September 2021 to July 2024.

== Military career ==
As a lieutenant colonel, Frewen commanded the 2nd Battalion, Royal Australian Regiment (2RAR) from January 2003 to December 2004. In this role, he was the initial international force commander for the Solomon Islands crisis in 2003. He commanded rotation 1 from initial deployment on 24 July until 19 November 2003. The task force comprised almost half of 2RAR, augmented by other Australian Army, Navy and Air Force personnel, and troops from New Zealand, Fiji, Papua New Guinea and Tonga. At its peak, he commanded 1900 personnel, HMAS Manoora, four other ships, Australian and New Zealand helicopters, and two Australian Caribou aircraft. He identified the surrender of warlord Harold Keke on 13 August 2003 as the highlight of the deployment. Frewen was appointed a Member of the Order of Australia (AM) as part of the 2004 Queen's Birthday Honours for "Exceptional performance during operations as the commander of Combined Joint Task Force (JTF) 635 during Operation Anode from July to November 2003."

Frewen commanded the 1st Brigade from 2012 to 2014 and Joint Task Force 633 in the Middle East from 2017 to 2018. He was awarded the Distinguished Service Cross (DSC) as part of the 2019 Australia Day Honours for "Distinguished command and leadership in warlike operations as the Commander Joint Task Force 633 on Operations OKRA and HIGHROAD from January 2017 to January 2018."

Frewen was appointed Principal Deputy Director-General of the Australian Signals Directorate (ASD) on 1 March 2018.

On 9 March 2020, the Australian Defence Organisation established a COVID-19 taskforce and seconded Frewen from ASD to lead it. Frewen was appointed Coordinator General of the National COVID Vaccine Taskforce on 4 June 2021. The taskforce was responsible for coordinating the roll out of COVID-19 vaccines. Frewen succeeded Vice Admiral Jonathan Mead as Chief of Joint Capabilities in September 2021, but remained seconded to the National COVID Vaccine Taskforce until July 2022. In recognition of his "exceptional leadership during the COVID-19 pandemic", Frewen was appointed an Officer of the Order of Australia in the 2023 Australia Day Honours.

Military offices
Preceded by Vice Admiral Jonathan Mead	Chief of Joint Capabilities; 2021–2024	Succeeded by Lieutenant General Susan Coyle
Preceded by Air Vice Marshal Timothy Innes	Commander Joint Task Force 633; 2017–2018	Succeeded by Rear Admiral Jaimie Hatcher
Preceded by Rear Admiral Trevor Jones	Head Military Strategic Commitments Division; 2014–2016	Succeeded by Major General Gus Gilmore
