= Navy Headquarters (Australia) =

Command of the Royal Australian Navy

- Country: Australia
- Allegiance: Australian Defence Force
- Branch: Royal Australian Navy
- Garrison/HQ: Canberra, Australian Capital Territory

The Navy Headquarters (formerly the Navy Strategic Command and Navy Systems Command) is the command responsible for training, personnel, resources, engineering and capability development of the Royal Australian Navy. As such Navy Headquarters works with the Capability Acquisition and Sustainment Group, the Defence Science and Technology Group, and the Joint Capabilities Group to ensure the personal, materiel and logistical capabilities of the Royal Australian Navy.

== Role and structure ==
The role and responsibilities of the Navy Headquarters is principally to provide logistical support services to the Fleet Command and the infrastructure and personnel of the Royal Australian Navy as a whole.

=== Navy People, Training and Resources ===
The Head of Navy People, Training and Resources (DCN/HNPTAR) is dual held by the Deputy Chief of Navy with the rank of rear admiral and is responsible for the training and management of the personnel of the Royal Australian Navy.

=== Navy Engineering, Regulation, Certification and Safety ===
The Head of Navy Engineering (HNE), with the rank of rear admiral and Naval Flag Administrator, is responsible for the management, delivery and maintenance of seaworthy material, maritime engineering, oversight of the Fleet Support Unit, overseeing health and safety requirements, and setting material certification requirements and licensing policy. As such the Head of Navy Engineering works with the Joint Logistics Command. The Head of Navy Engineering operates one of the most comprehensive engineering programs in Australia.

==== Naval Technical Bureau ====
The Naval Technical Bureau is composed of uniform and civilian specialists across engineering and technological professions responsible for the delivery of seaworthy materiel.

==== Maritime Safety Bureau ====
The Maritime Safety Bureau is responsible for the monitoring and defining policy for maritime safety and operational seaworthiness of the Royal Australian Navy.

=== Navy Capability ===
The Head of Navy Capability (HCN), with the rank of rear admiral, is responsible for navy modernisation, investment, and force design bringing the alignment of capabilities of the three services together into a joint force. The Head of Navy Capability works with the Capability Acquisition and Sustainment Group.

==== Sea Power Centre ====
The Sea Power Centre – Australia (SPC–A) was established in the early 1990s to act as an autonomous research centre in order to foster and encourage development of maritime strategic thought by providing intellectual rigour to the public debate on maritime strategy and other maritime issues.
