= Chief of Joint Capabilities =

Head of the Joint Capabilities Group, Australian Defence Force

- Incumbent; Air Marshal Glen Braz since 7 July 2026
- Member of: Australian Defence Force
- Reports to: Chief of the Defence Force
- Inaugural holder: Air Marshal Warren McDonald
- Formation: 1 July 2017
- Website: www.defence.gov.au/JCG/

The Chief of Joint Capabilities (CJC) is the head of the Joint Capabilities Group (JCG) in the Australian Department of Defence. The Joint Capabilities Group was raised on 1 July 2017 with the position created as a result, with the inaugural CJC being Air Marshal Warren McDonald. The current chief is Lieutenant General Susan Coyle, who was appointed to the position in July 2024.

Due to the importance of the functions overseen by the Chief of Joint Capabilities, retired Major General Gus McLachlan described the position in 2024 as "really the fourth of our service chiefs" and noted that they are responsible for "domains that cover the new areas of human conflict".

== Chiefs of Joint Capabilities ==
The following officers have been appointed as Chief of Joint Capabilities:

Rank	Name	Post-nominals	Service	Term began	Term ended	Time in appointment
Air Marshal	Warren McDonald	AO, CSC	RAAF	1 July 2017	24 November 2020	3 years, 146 days
Vice Admiral	Jonathan Mead	AO	RAN	24 November 2020	24 September 2021	304 days
Lieutenant General	John Frewen	AO, DSC	Army	24 September 2021 (Note: Frewen did not formally assume the post of Chief of Joint Capabilities until August 2022, since he was seconded as Coordinator General of the National COVID Vaccine Taskforce from June 2021 to July 2022. Rear Admiral Ian Murray was Acting Chief of Joint Capabilities during this period.)	4 July 2024	2 years, 284 days
Lieutenant General	Susan Coyle	AM, CSC, DSM	Army	4 July 2024	7 July 2026	2 years, 3 days
Air Marshal	Glen Braz	AM, CSC, DSM	RAAF	7 July 2026	Incumbent	62 days
