= Al Minhad Air Base =

Military installation in the United Arab Emirates

- قاعدة المنهاد الجوية
- Near Dubai in the United Arab Emirates
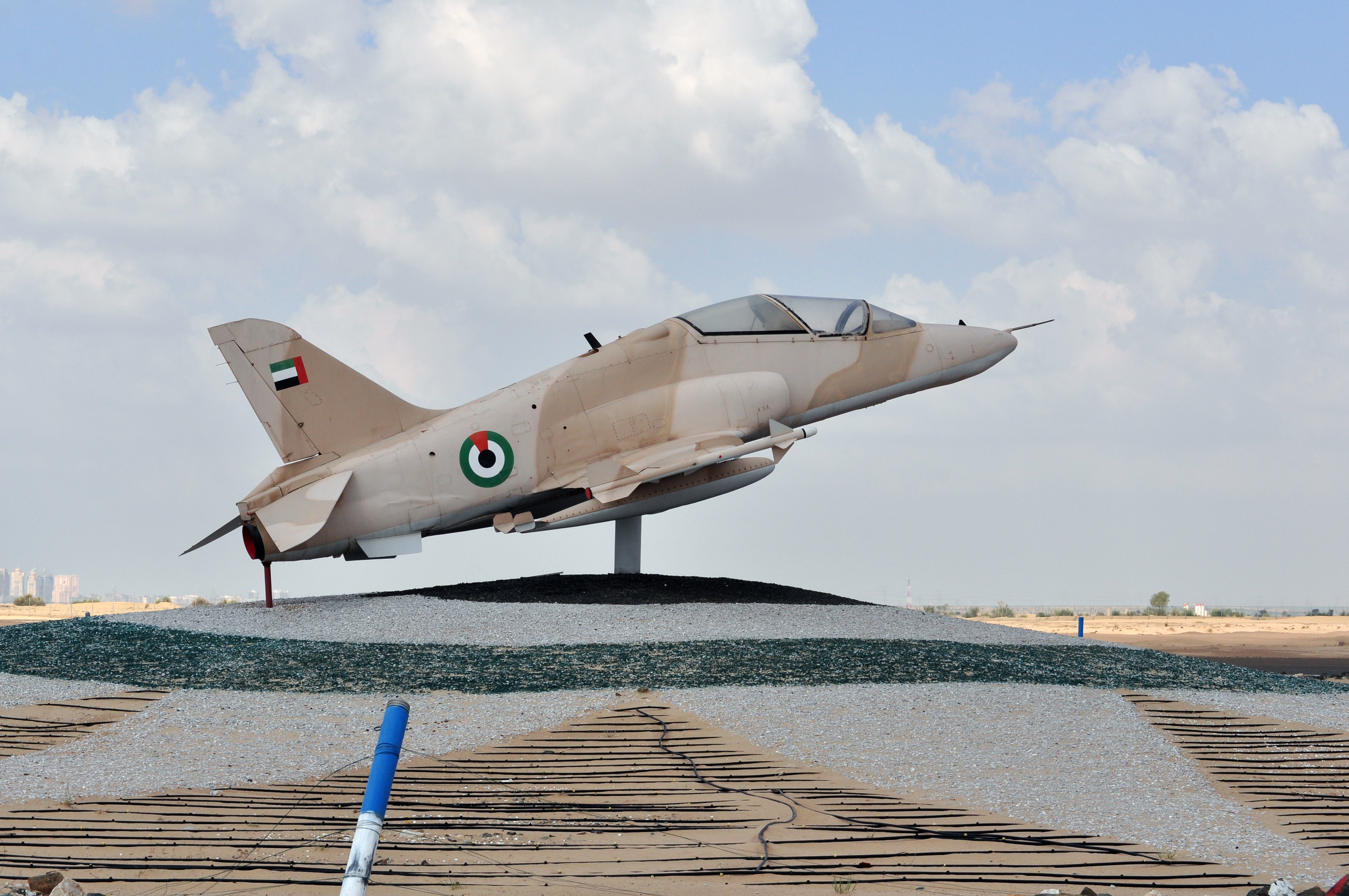
- A BAe Hawk 102 gate guardian at Al Minhad AB

- Emblem of the United Arab Emirates Air Force

Site information
- Type: UAE Air Force base
- Owner: Government of the United Arab Emirates
- Operator: United Arab Emirates Air Force; Royal Air Force
- Controlled by: Central Air Command of United Arab Emirates Air Force
- Condition: Operational

Location
- Location in the United Arab Emirates
- Coordinates: 25°01.61′N 055°21.98′E

Airfield information
- Identifiers: IATA: NHD, ICAO: OMDM
- Elevation: 52 metres (171 ft) AMSL
Runways
Direction	Length and surface
09/27	3,932 metres (12,900 ft) asphalt/concrete
- Sources: DoD FLIP

Al Minhad Air Base (Arabic: قاعدة المنهاد الجوية, IATA: NHD, ICAO: OMDM, also just Minhad Air Base) is a military installation in the United Arab Emirates. The base is located approximately 15 miles (24 km) south of Dubai and is operated by the United Arab Emirates Air Force.

It is the headquarters of the Australian Defence Force's Joint Task Force 633 and supports Australian operations in the Middle East. A 2010 US diplomatic cable said that the base was "a critical hub for Coalition/ISAF partners in Afghanistan, including the Australians, Dutch, Canadians, Brits and Kiwis."

As of March 2024 the airbase is host to the permanent British Support Operations facility Donnelly Lines.

== Facilities ==
The airfield resides at an elevation of 172 ft (52 m) above mean sea level. It has one runway, 09/27 which has an asphalt surface measuring 12,901 ft × 150 ft (3,932 m × 46 m), and a parallel taxiway with a width of 38 m (125 ft).

== British Armed Forces ==
In January 2013, the UK's No. 906 Expeditionary Air Wing RAF was stood up at the base. 906 Wing was an expansion of the RAF's presence. Prior to Christmas 2012, No. 6 Squadron RAF had exercised their Eurofighter Typhoons from the UAE.

The base was being used extensively by the RAF during the Operation Pitting, the UK's evacuation of Kabul in 2021, with an Airbus KC2 Voyager used for long-haul back to RAF Brize Norton and the Boeing C-17A Globemaster and Lockheed C-130J Hercules operating between Kabul and Minhad Air Base.

In March 2024, HRH The Princess Royal opened an "expansive" new permanent facility called Donnelly Lines to support British operations in the region. The facility contains a headquarters and accommodation.

== Coalition use ==
Several foreign countries allied to the United Arab Emirates are believed to have made use of Al Minhad Air Base since the early 2000s to support the logistics supply chain for their military operations in Afghanistan. Use of the Al Minhad Air Base is a sensitive matter for the Government of the United Arab Emirates, which imposes a diplomatic agreement stating that the militaries of foreign governments not advertise the host nation nor location of their operations in the United Arab Emirates due to "local sensitivities" about allowing a foreign military presence within its borders.

- Australia - The Australian Defence Force (ADF) has used Al Minhad as their main transport and logistics hub in the Middle East since the withdrawal of Australian combat forces from Iraq in 2008. The RAAF had operated AP-3C Orions from the base from 2003 to support operations in the region. In 2008, an agreement was signed allowing Australia to command its regional headquarters there. At Al Minhad, the ADF maintains a facility named Camp Baird. The base supported the military intervention against the Islamic State of Iraq and the Levant, deploying Boeing F/A-18F Super Hornets, Boeing E-7A Wedgetails and Airbus KC-30As. In early 2015, Boeing F/A-18F Super Hornets replaced the McDonnell Douglas F/A-18A Hornets.
- Canada - The Canadian Forces operated a forward logistics support facility in the Middle East, called Camp Mirage. It is widely believed that Camp Mirage was located at Al Minhad Air Base from its founding in autumn 2001 until its closure in autumn 2010, due to an unrelated disagreement over securing additional landing rights for UAE's civilian airlines at Canadian airports. The United States military relied on the UAE bases for assistance during the Gulf War and the counter ISIS conflict in Iraq.
- Netherlands - The Armed forces of the Netherlands had deployed assets here.
- New Zealand - The New Zealand Defence Force had deployed assets here.

== Bibliography ==
- United States Department of State (9 February 2010). "UAE - Scenesetter for visit of CJCS (10ABUDHABI69)". WikiLeaks via United States diplomatic cables leak. "The mission name Operation Troy was originally assigned to the NZDF Air Survelliance Task Unit prior to its deployment to the Middle East in 2003. On its return to New Zealand in 2003 the name was transferred to the NZDF Logistics Hub which remained in the Middle East to provide an essential logistics and transport hub" [developed mostly into support for Afghanistan activities].
- "Current weather for OMDM". NOAA/NWS.
- Airport information for Al Minhad Air Base at Transport Search website.
