= Distinguished Service Medal (Australia) =

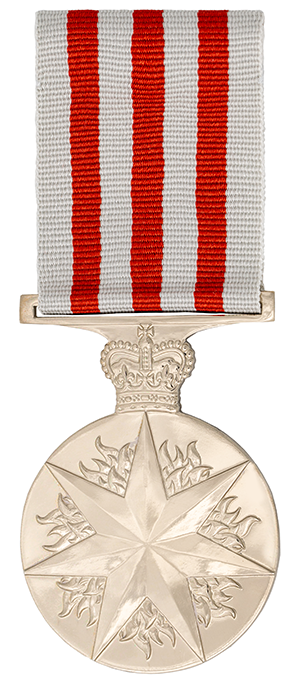
- Obverse of medal and ribbon
- Type: Medal
- Awarded for: Distinguished leadership in warlike operations.
- Presented by: Governor-General of Australia
- Eligibility: Members of the Australian Defence Force
- Post-nominals: DSM
- Status: Currently awarded
- Established: 15 January 1991
- First award: 1993
- Final award: 2025 Australia Day Honours

Highlights
- Total: 360
- Total awarded posthumously: 2
- Total recipients: 362
- Undress ribbons with one and two bars

Order of Wear
- Next (higher): Bravery Medal
- Next (lower): Public Service Medal
- Related: Distinguished Service Cross; Commendation for Distinguished Service

The Distinguished Service Medal (DSM) is a military decoration awarded to personnel of the Australian Defence Force for distinguished leadership in warlike operations. The DSM was introduced in 1991 and is the second highest distinguished service decoration in the Australian Honours System. Awards are made by the governor-general of Australia on the advice of the minister for Defence. Recipients of the Distinguished Service Medal are entitled to use the post-nominal letters "DSM". Since its inception 362 awards have been made—which includes nine bars and one second bar—with the most recent being announced in the 2025 Australia Day Honours.

== Government allowance ==
The Government of Australia may grant an allowance to veterans or serving members of the Australian Defence Force who have been awarded the Distinguished Service Medal, or other awards for gallantry. At November 2007, this allowance was A$2.10 per fortnight.

== Description ==
- The Distinguished Service Medal is ensigned with the Crown of St Edward in nickel-silver. The obverse has a Federation star superimposed on a circle of flames.
- The medal has a nickel-silver suspender bar.
- The medal ribbon has alternating vertical stripes: four silver-blue and three ochre-red.

== See also ==
- Distinguished Service Cross (Australia)
- Distinguished Service Order (United Kingdom)
- Distinguished Service Medal (United Kingdom)
- Distinguished Service Cross (United Kingdom)
- Australian Honours Order of Precedence
