= Consolidated B-24 Liberator =

1939 bomber aircraft family by Consolidated Aircraft

B-24 Liberator
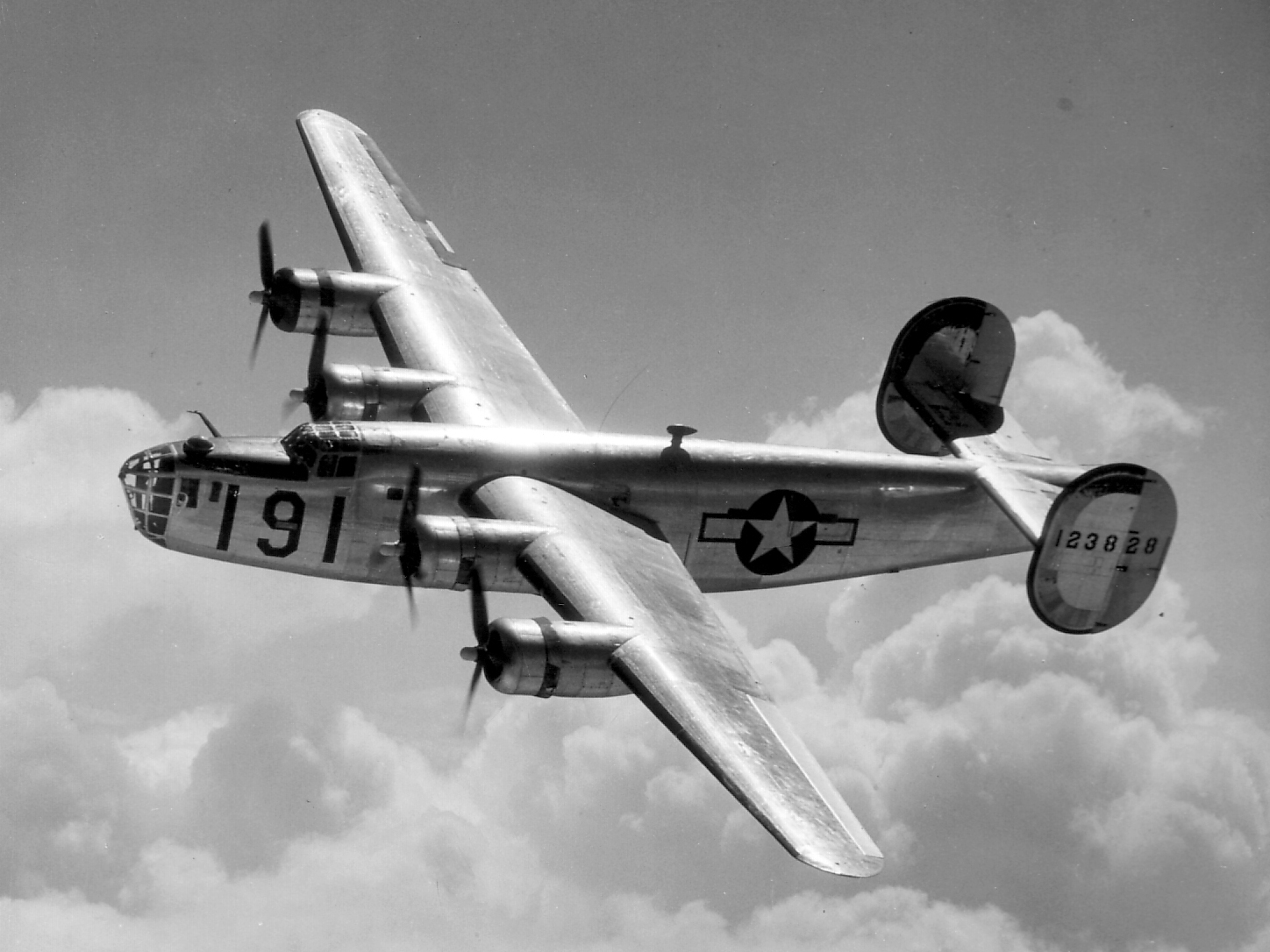
- United States Army Air Forces Consolidated B-24D Liberator over Maxwell Field, Alabama

General information
- Type: Heavy bomber; Anti-submarine warfare; Maritime patrol aircraft
- Manufacturer: Consolidated Aircraft
- Primary users: United States Army Air Forces: United States Navy; Royal Air Force; Royal Australian Air Force
- Number built: 18,188

History
- Manufactured: 1940–1945
- Introduction date: 1941
- First flight: 29 December 1939
- Retired: 1968 (Indian Air Force)
- Variants: Consolidated C-87 Liberator Express; Consolidated Liberator I
- Developed into: Consolidated R2Y; Consolidated B-32 Dominator; Consolidated PB4Y-2 Privateer

The Consolidated B-24 Liberator is an American heavy bomber, designed by Consolidated Aircraft of San Diego, California. It was known within the company as the Model 32, and some initial production aircraft were laid down as export models designated as various LB-30s, in the Land Bomber design category.

At its inception, the B-24 was a modern design featuring a highly efficient shoulder-mounted, high aspect ratio Davis wing. The wing gave the Liberator a high cruise speed, long range and the ability to carry a heavy bomb load. In comparison with its contemporaries, the B-24 was relatively difficult to fly and had poor low-speed performance; it also had a lower ceiling (28,000 ft) and was less robust than the Boeing B-17 Flying Fortress. While aircrews tended to prefer the B-17, the United States Army Air Corps favored the B-24 and procured it in huge numbers for a wide variety of roles. At approximately 18,500 units – including 8,685 manufactured by Ford Motor Company – it holds records as the world's most produced bomber, heavy bomber, multi-engine aircraft, and American military aircraft in history.

The B-24 was used extensively in World War II, where it served in every branch of the American armed forces, as well as several Allied air forces and navies. It saw use in every theater of operations. Along with the B-17, the B-24 was the mainstay of the US strategic bombing campaign in the Western European theater. Due to its range, it proved useful in bombing operations in the Pacific, including the bombing of Japan. Long-range anti-submarine Liberators played an instrumental role in closing the Mid-Atlantic gap in the Battle of the Atlantic. The C-87 transport derivative served as a longer range, higher capacity counterpart to the Douglas C-47 Skytrain.

By the end of World War II, the technological breakthroughs of the Boeing B-29 Superfortress and other modern types had surpassed the bombers that served from the start of the war. The B-24 was rapidly phased out of US service, although the PB4Y-2 Privateer maritime patrol derivative carried on in service with the US Navy in the Korean War.

== Design and development ==
=== Initial specifications ===
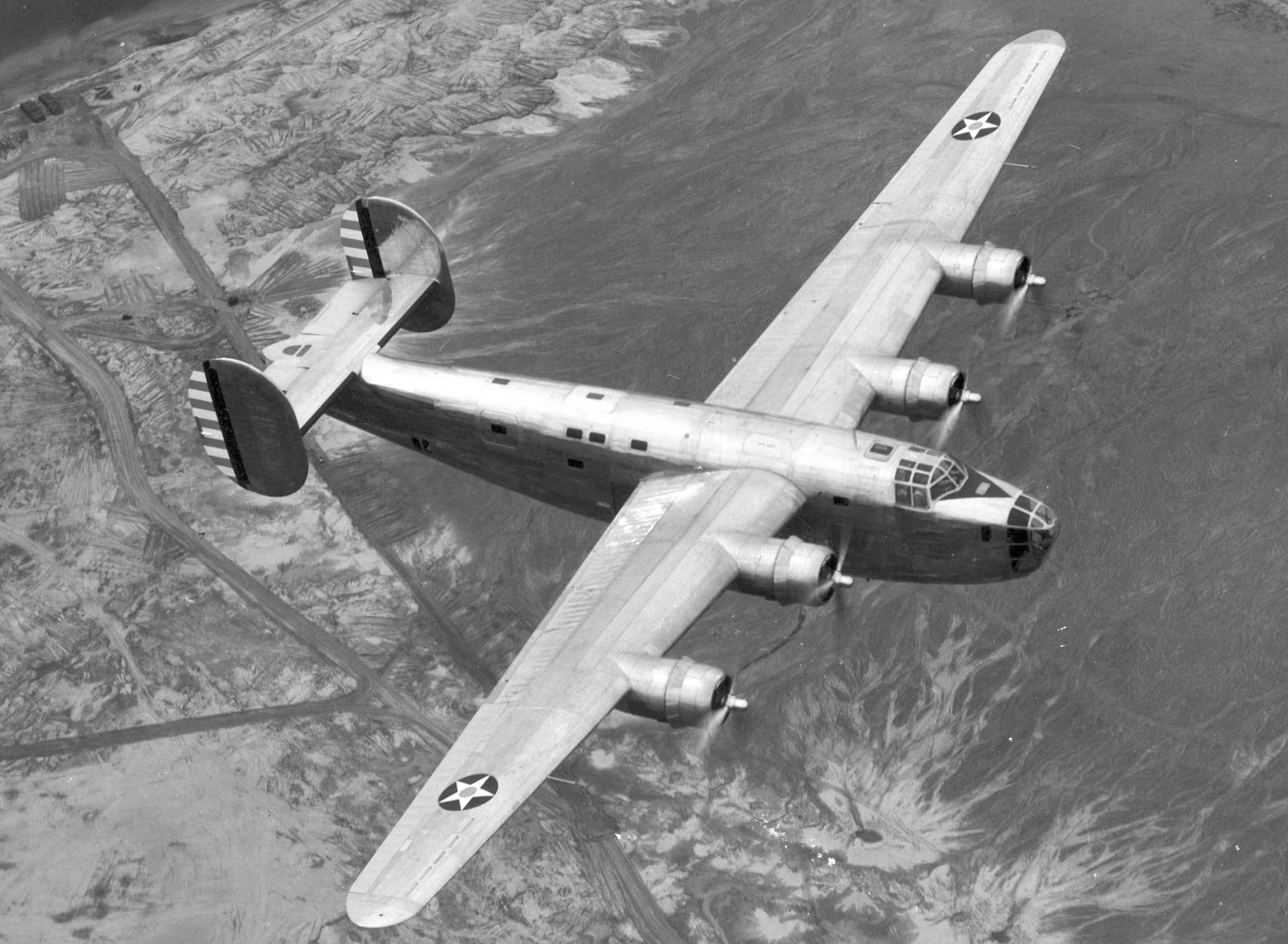
XB-24 in flight

The Liberator originated from a United States Army Air Corps (USAAC) request in 1938 for Consolidated to produce the B-17 under license. After company executives including President Reuben Fleet visited the Boeing factory in Seattle, Washington, Consolidated decided to submit a more modern design of its own. The new Model 32 combined designer David R. Davis's wing, a high-efficiency airfoil design created by unorthodox means, with the twin tail design from the Consolidated Model 31 flying boat, together on a new fuselage. This new fuselage was intentionally designed around twin bomb bays, each one being the same size and capacity of the B-17 bomb bays.

In January 1939, the USAAC, under Specification C-212, formally invited Consolidated to submit a design study for a bomber with longer range, higher speed and greater ceiling than the B-17. The specification was written such that the Model 32 would automatically be the winning design. The program was run under the umbrella group, "Project A", an Air Corps requirement for an intercontinental bomber that had been conceived in the mid-1930s. Although the B-24 did not meet Project A goals, it was a step in that direction. Project A led to the development of the Boeing B-29 and Consolidated's own B-32 and B-36.

=== Design ===
The B-24 had a shoulder-mounted high aspect ratio Davis wing which proved highly efficient in all phases of flight, allowing a relatively high airspeed and long range. Compared to the B-17, it had a 6-foot (1.8 m) larger wingspan but a lower wing area. This gave the B-24 a 35% higher wing loading. The relatively thick wing allowed the loading of more fuel while delivering increased lift and speed, but pilots complained that it tended to become less responsive when fully loaded at altitude and in bad weather. The Davis wing was also more susceptible to ice formation than contemporary designs, causing distortions of the aerofoil section and resulting in the loss of lift, with unpleasant experiences drawing such comments as, "The Davis wing won't hold enough ice to chill your drink". The wing was also more susceptible to damage than the B-17's wing, making the aircraft less able to absorb battle damage.

The wing carried four supercharged Pratt & Whitney R-1830-35 Twin Wasp engines mounted in cowlings borrowed from the PBY Catalina (similar except for being oval in cross-section allowing for oil coolers mounted on each side of the engine) that turned 3-bladed variable-pitch propellers.

The tailplane featured two large oval vertical stabilizers mounted at the ends of a rectangular horizontal stabilizer. As early as 1942, it was recognized that the Liberator's handling and stability could be improved by the use of a single vertical fin. The single fin was tested by Ford on a single B-24ST variant and an experimental XB-24K: it was found to improve handling. However, all Liberators were produced with twin oval fins, with the exception of eight preproduction B-24N aircraft. The B-24N was intended as a major production variant featuring a single tail. Over 5000 orders for this version were placed in 1945, but they were cancelled due to the end of the war. The single fin did appear in production on the PB4Y Privateer derivative.

The B-24's spacious, slab-sided fuselage (which earned the aircraft the nickname "Flying Boxcar") was built around two central bomb bays that could accommodate up to 8,000 pounds (3,600 kg) of ordnance in each compartment (but rarely did, as this decreased range and altitude). The forward and aft bomb bay compartments were further split longitudinally with a centerline ventral catwalk just 9 inches (23 cm) wide, which also functioned as the fuselage's structural keel beam.

An unusual four-panel set of all-metal, tambour-panel "roller-type" bomb bay doors, which operated very much like the movable enclosure of a rolltop desk, retracted into the fuselage. These types of doors created a minimum of aerodynamic drag to keep speed high over the target area; they also allowed the bomb bays to be opened while on the ground since the low ground clearance prevented the use of normal bomb bay doors. The occasional need during a mission for crewmen to move from fore to aft within the B-24's fuselage over the narrow catwalk was a drawback shared with other bomber designs.

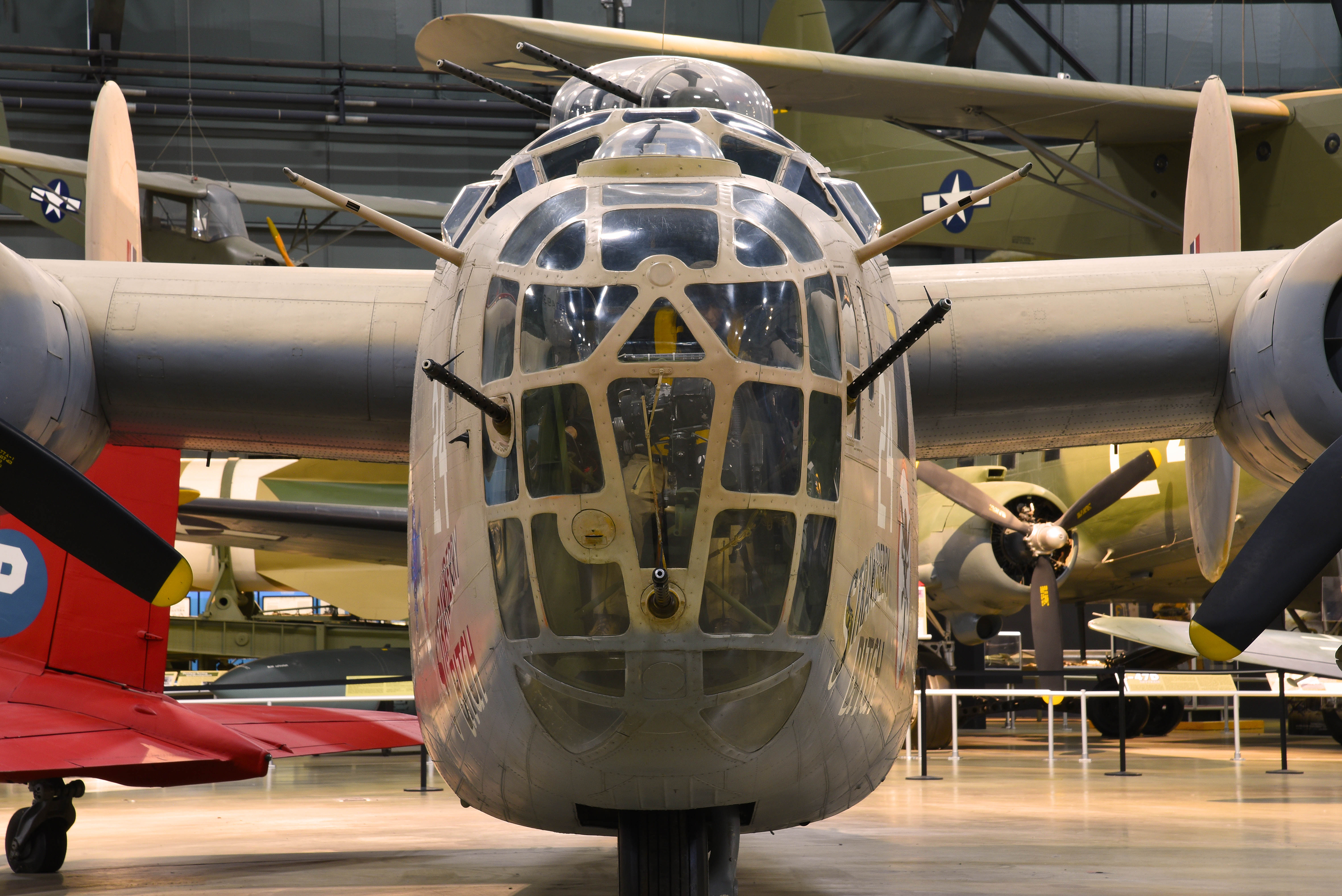
Nose view of a B-24D located at the National Museum of the USAF

The Liberator carried a crew of up to ten. The pilot and co-pilot sat alongside each other in a well-glazed cockpit. The navigator and bombardier – who could also double as a nose or wiggly ear gunners (guns mounted in the sides of the aircraft nose) – sat in the nose, fronted on the pre-B-24H models with a well-framed "greenhouse" nose with some two dozen glazed panels and with two flexible ball-mounts built into it for forward defensive firepower using .30 caliber (7.62 mm) Browning M1919 machine guns (later versions were fitted with a powered twin-.50 caliber (12.7 mm) M2 Browning machine gun nose turret). The radio/radar operator sat behind the pilots, facing sideways and sometimes doubled as a waist gunner. The flight engineer sat adjacent to the radio operator behind the pilots; he operated the upper gun turret (when fitted), located just behind the cockpit and in front of the wing.

Up to four crew members could be located in the waist, operating waist guns, a retractable lower ball turret gun, and a tail gun turret matching the nose turret. The waist gun hatches were provided with doors. The ball turret was required to be retractable for ground clearance when preparing to land as well as for greater aerodynamic efficiency. The tail gunner's powered twin-gun turret was located at the end of the tail, behind the tailplane.

The B-24 featured a tricycle undercarriage, the first American bomber to do so, with the main gear extending out of the wing on long, single-oleo strut legs. It used differential braking and differential thrust for ground steering, which made taxiing difficult.

=== Armament ===
The defensive armament of the B-24 varied from transport variants, which were usually unarmed, to bombers armed with up to ten .50 caliber (12.7 mm) M2 Browning machine guns located in turrets and waist gun positions.

Early model Liberators were fitted with a top-mounted turret, a tail turret and single machine guns located in the waist and in the glazed nose. The B-24D initially featured upper, belly and tail turrets, plus swiveling single guns in the waist and on either side of the nose. The belly turret was a periscopically sighted Bendix model. The turret proved unsatisfactory and was soon replaced by a tunnel gun, which was itself omitted. Later D models were fitted with the retractable Sperry ball turret.

The B-24H saw the replacement of the glazed 'green house' nose with a nose turret, which reduced the B-24s vulnerability to head-on attacks. The bombsight was located below the turret.

Long-range naval patrol versions often carried a light defensive armament. Being on long-distance patrols, they generally flew outside the range of enemy fighters. Also, the necessity of range increased the importance of weight and aerodynamic efficiency. Thus naval patrol often omitted top, belly and nose turrets. Some were fitted with a belly pack containing fixed, forward-facing cannon.

=== Prototypes and service evaluation ===
The US Army Air Corps awarded a contract for the prototype XB-24 in March 1939, with the requirement that one example should be ready before the end of the year. Consolidated finished the prototype and had it ready for its first flight two days before the end of 1939. The design was simple in concept but, nevertheless, advanced for its time. Consolidated incorporated innovative features such as a tricycle landing gear and Davis wing.

Compared to the B-17, the proposed Model 32 had a shorter fuselage and 25% less wing area, but had a 6 ft (1.8 m) greater wingspan and a substantially larger carrying capacity, as well as a distinctive twin tail. Whereas the B-17 used 9-cylinder Wright R-1820 Cyclone engines, the Consolidated design used twin-row, 14-cylinder Pratt & Whitney R-1830 "Twin Wasp" radials of 1,000 hp (750 kW). The maximum takeoff weight was one of the highest of the period.

The new design would be the first American heavy bomber in production to use tricycle landing gear – the North American B-25 Mitchell medium bomber's predecessor, the NA-40 introduced this feature in January 1939 – with the Consolidated Model 32 having long, thin wings with the efficient "Davis" high aspect ratio design (also used on the projected Model 31 twin-engined commercial flying boat) promising to provide maximum fuel efficiency. Wind tunnel testing and experimental programs using an existing Consolidated Model 31 provided extensive data on the flight characteristics of the Davis airfoil.

Early orders, placed before the XB-24 had flown, included 36 for the USAAC, 120 for the French Air Force and 164 for the Royal Air Force (RAF). The name "Liberator" was originally given to it by the RAF, and subsequently adopted by the USAAF as the official name for the Model 24. When France fell in 1940, their aircraft were re-directed to the RAF. One outcome of the British and French purchasing commissions was a backlog of orders amounting to $680m, of which $400m was foreign orders, US official statistics indicating tooling, plant and expansion advanced the previously anticipated volume of US aircraft production by up to a year. A consequence of the British orders went beyond requests for specific modifications: as the RAF accepted some designs while rejecting others, American production was – to some extent – re-directed along specific lines that accorded with British doctrine, the B-24's capacious bomb bay and ability to carry 8,000 lb ordnance a case in point.

After initial testing, the XB-24 was found to be deficient in several areas. One major failure of the prototype was that it failed to meet the top speed requirements specified in the contract. As built, the XB-24 top speed was only 273 mph (439 km/h) instead of the specified 311 mph (501 km/h). As a result, the mechanically supercharged Pratt & Whitney R-1830-33s were replaced with the turbo-supercharged R-1830s. Additionally, the tail span was widened by 2 ft (61 cm) and the pitot-static probes were relocated from the wings to the fuselage. The XB-24 was then re-designated XB-24B—these changes became standard on all B-24s built starting with the B-24C model.

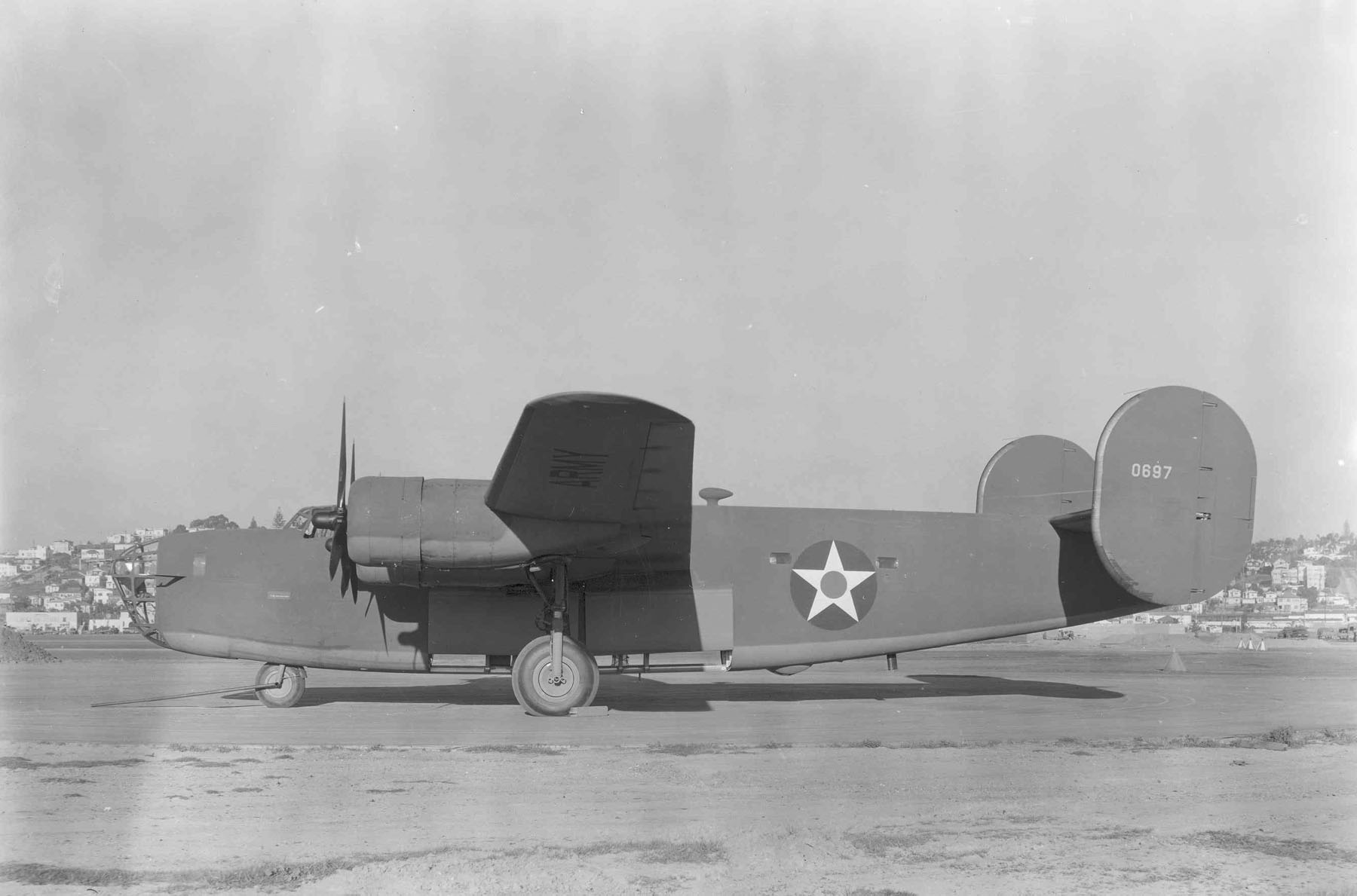
An early B-24D

In April 1939, the USAAC initially ordered seven YB-24 under CAC contract # 12464. The US policy at the time, despite neutrality, was that American requirements could be deferred while its Allies could immediately put US production into the war effort. The added advantage was the American types could be assessed in the European war zone earlier. Thus the first six YB-24 were released for direct purchase under CAC contract # F-677 on 9 November 1940. These aircraft were redesignated LB-30A. The seventh aircraft was used by Consolidated and the USAAC to test armor installations as well as self-sealing fuel tanks. Initially, these aircraft were to be given USAAC serials 39–681 to 39-687. Due to deferments of the US requirements, the US purchase was twice postponed, and the serial numbers were changed to 40–696 to 40-702. When the RAF purchased the first six YB-24 aircraft, the serial numbers were reassigned to an early batch of B-24D funded by the deferment.

=== Flying the B-24 ===
Lindell Hendrix, later a test pilot for Republic Aviation, flew B-24s for the Eighth Air Force. Hendrix preferred the B-24 to the B-17. In Eighth Air Force combat configuration, the aircraft carried 8,000 pounds (3,600 kg) of bombs. It could manage an altitude of no more than 25,000 ft (7,600 m), which was 3,000 to 4,000 feet (900 to 1,200 m) less than a B-17, but it flew 10–15 mph (16–24 km/h) faster. Its lower altitude made it more vulnerable to flak. Hendrix figured that Germans understood it was easier to hit, and that it carried more bombs.

It was necessary when flying the B-24, to get "on step". This meant climbing to about 500 ft (150 m) above cruise altitude, levelling off, achieving a cruise speed of 165–170 mph (266–274 km/h), then descending to assigned altitude. Failing to do this meant that the B-24 flew slightly nose high, and it used more fuel. The Davis wing made the B-24 sensitive to weight distribution. Hendrix claimed that a lightly loaded B-24 could out-turn a P-38 Lightning. A heavily loaded B-24 was difficult to fly at speeds of less than 160 mph (260 km/h). The B-24's controls were heavy, especially if the control rigging was not properly tensioned.

B-24s leaked fuel. Crews flew with the bomb bay doors slightly open to dissipate potentially explosive fumes. Hendrix did not permit smoking on his B-24, even though he was a smoker. Chain smoker "Tex" Thornton, then in command of the US Army Air Corps' Statistical Control, flew across the Atlantic in a B-24, and was not permitted to smoke. Thornton's Statistical Control group demonstrated that Eighth Air Force B-24s were taking lower casualties than B-17s because they were being given shorter, safer missions. The B-17s actually delivered more bombs to the target than B-24s.

== Operational history ==
=== RAF ===
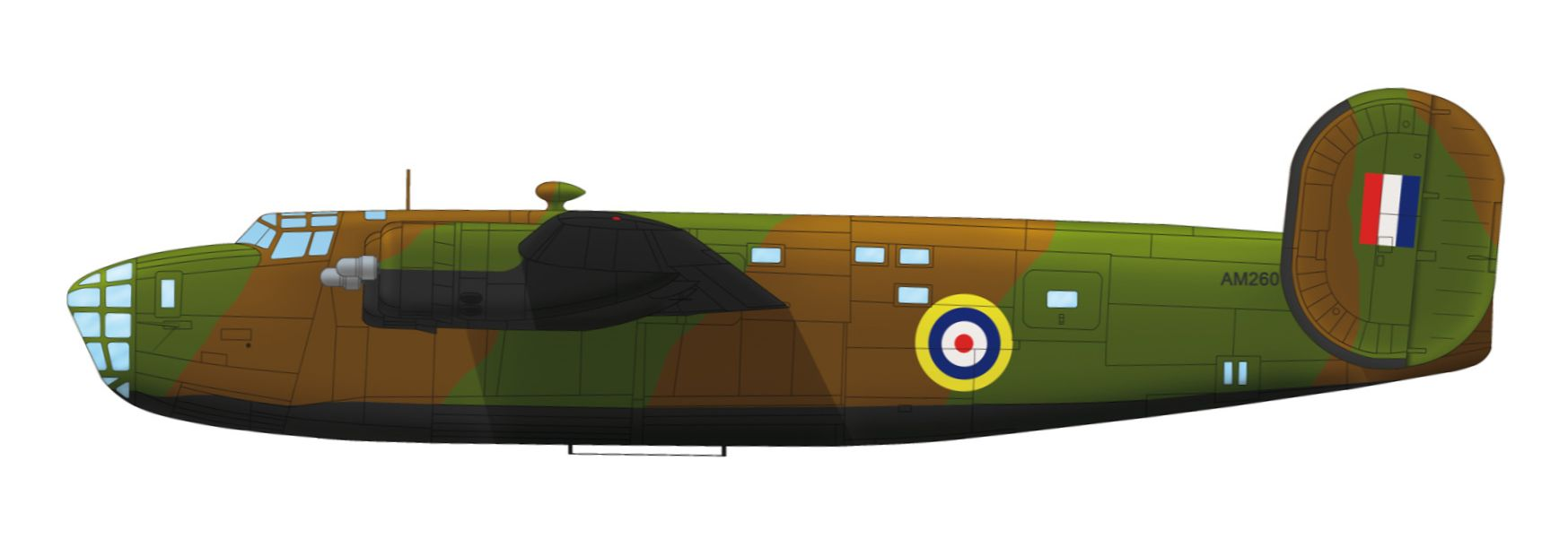
Consolidated LB-30A, s/n AM260, used by Atlantic Ferry Command

The first British Liberators had been ordered by the Anglo-French Purchasing Board in 1940. After the Fall of France the French orders were in most cases transferred to the United Kingdom. The RAF found, as did the US, that global war increased the need for air transports and early-type bombers and seaplanes were converted or completed as cargo carriers and transports. LB-30As were assigned to transatlantic flights by RAF Ferry Command, between Canada and Prestwick, Scotland. The first Liberators in British service were ex-USAAF YB-24s converted to Liberator GR Is (USAAF designation: LB-30A). The aircraft were all modified for logistic use in Montreal. Changes included the removal of all armament, provision for passenger seating, a revised cabin oxygen and heating system. Ferry Command's Atlantic Return Ferry Service flew civilian ferry pilots, who had delivered aircraft to the UK, back to North America. The most important role, however, for the first batch of the Liberator GR Is, was in service with RAF Coastal Command on anti-submarine patrols in the Battle of the Atlantic.

LB-30A (YB-24) in RAF service

Later in 1941, the first Liberators entered RAF service. This model introduced self-sealing fuel tanks, a 2 ft 7 in (79 cm) plug in the forward fuselage to create more space for crew members and, more vitally, ever more equipment such as ASV Mark II radar (anticipated early in the Liberator's development when Reuben Fleet told the engineering team he had a gut feeling the nose was too short). The Mark II was the first Liberator to be equipped with powered turrets, one plane having them installed before leaving San Diego, the remainder having them installed in the field: four Browning Boulton Paul Type A Mk IV with 600 rounds of .303 in (7.7 mm) ammunition in the dorsal position; and a Boulton Paul Type E Mk II with 2,200 rounds in the tail (later increased to 2,500 rounds), supplemented by pairs of guns at the waist position, a single gun in the nose and another in the belly, for a total of fourteen guns. The maximum take-off weight was slightly raised to 64,250 pounds (29,140 kg), the maximum altitude lifted from 21,200 to 24,000 feet (6,500 to 7,300 m) but the maximum speed was reduced to 263 mph (423 km/h), largely as a result of increased drag.

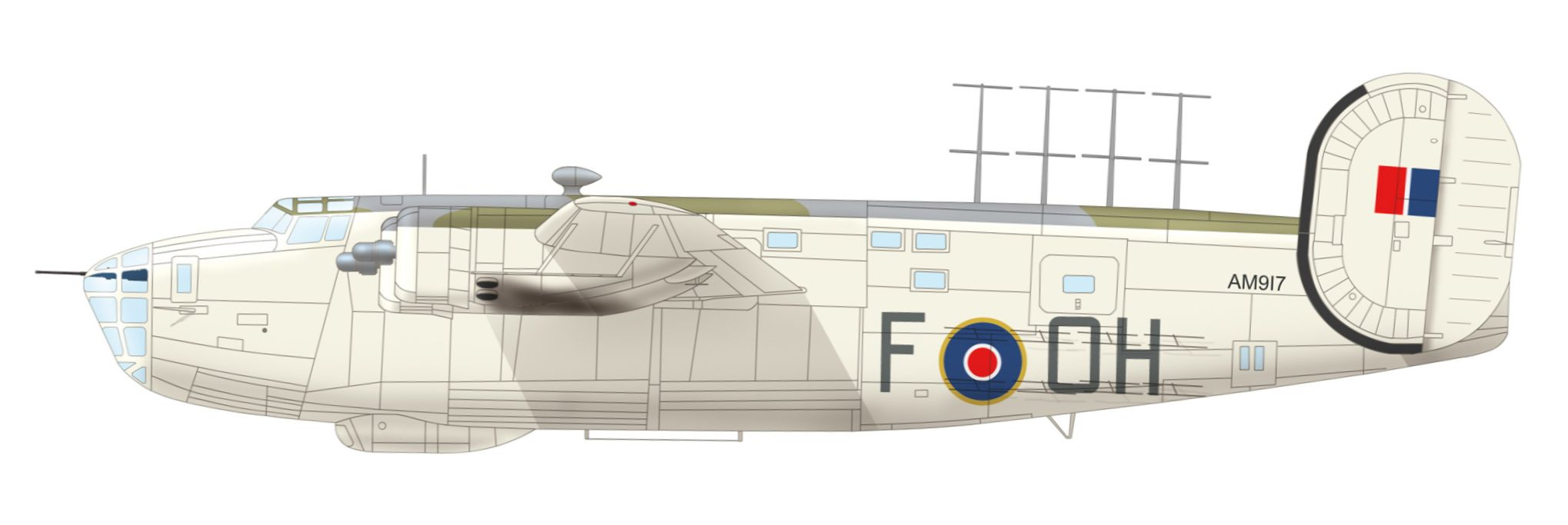
Consolidated Liberator Mk.I of 120 Squadron Coastal Command RAF, used from December 1941

The Liberator II (referred to as the LB-30A by the USAAF) were divided between Coastal Command, Bomber Command, and the British Overseas Airways Corporation (BOAC). Both BOAC and the RAF used converted Liberator IIs as unarmed long-range cargo carriers. These aircraft flew between the United Kingdom and Egypt (with an extensive detour around Spain over the Atlantic), and they were used in the evacuation of Java in the East Indies. BOAC also flew trans-Atlantic services and other various long-range air transportation routes. Two RAF bomber squadrons with Liberators were deployed to the Middle East in early 1942. While RAF Bomber Command did not use B-24s as strategic bombers over mainland North West Europe, No. 223 Squadron RAF, one of Bomber Command's 100 (Bomber Support) Group squadrons, used 20 Liberator VIs to carry electronic jamming equipment to counter German radar.

=== Antisubmarine and maritime patrols ===
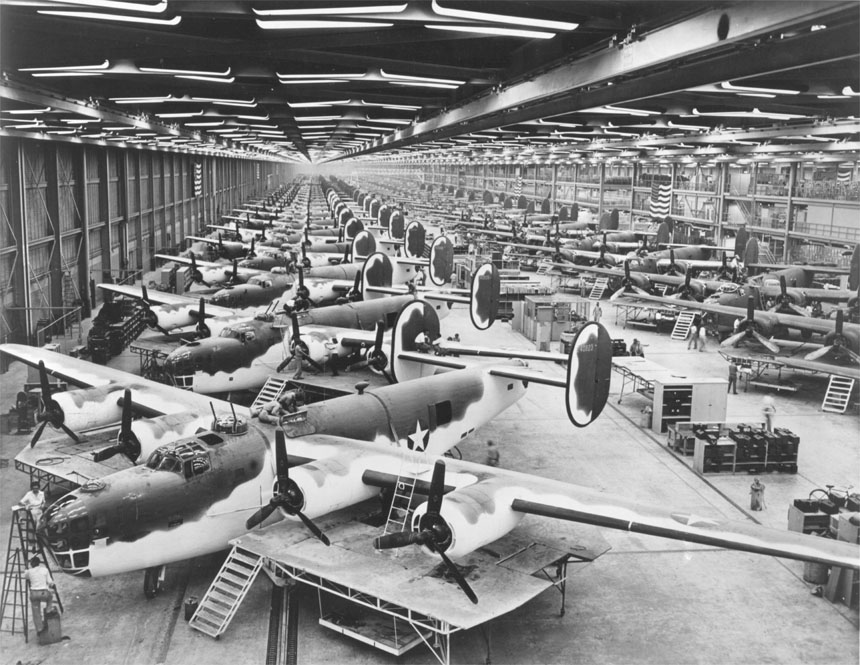
AAF Antisubmarine Command (AAFAC) modifications at the Consolidated-Vultee Plant, Fort Worth, Texas in the foreground in the olive drab and white paint scheme. To the rear of this front line are partly assembled C-87 "Liberator Express Transports".

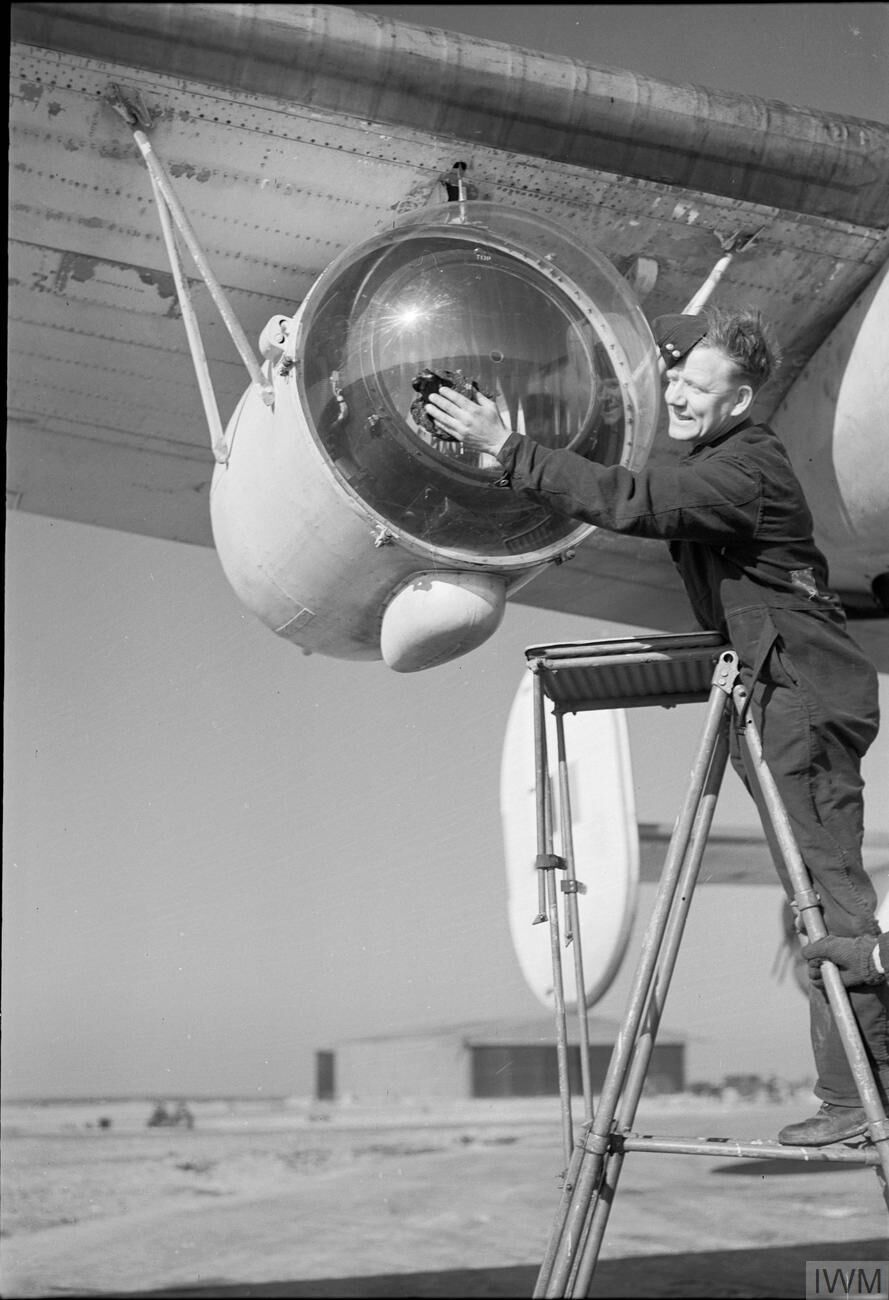
Anti-Submarine Weapons: Leigh light used for spotting U-boats on the surface at night, fitted to a Liberator aircraft of Royal Air Force Coastal Command. 26 February 1944.

The Liberators made a significant contribution to Allied victory in the Battle of the Atlantic against German U-boats. Aircraft had the ability to undertake surprise air attacks against surfaced submarines. Liberators assigned to the RAF's Coastal Command in 1941, offensively to patrol against submarines in the eastern Atlantic Ocean, produced immediate results. The introduction of Very Long Range (VLR) Liberators vastly increased the reach of the UK's maritime reconnaissance force, closing the Mid Atlantic Gap where a lack of air cover had allowed U-boats to operate without risk of aerial attack.

For 12 months, No. 120 Squadron RAF of Coastal Command with its handful of worn and modified early model Liberators supplied the only air cover for convoys in the Atlantic Gap, the Liberator being the only airplane with sufficient range. The VLR Liberators sacrificed some armor and often gun turrets to save weight, while carrying extra aviation gasoline in their bomb-bay tanks. Liberators were equipped with ASV Mk. II radar, which together with the Leigh light, gave them the ability to hunt U-boats by day and by night. Before the Leigh Light, not a single enemy submarine had been sunk in over five months, but in combination with radar, it was so overwhelmingly effective that many German submarine crews chose to surface during the day so that they could at least see the aircraft attacking them and have a chance to fire their anti-aircraft weaponry in defense.

These Liberators operated from both sides of the Atlantic with the Royal Canadian Air Force and the Army Air Forces Antisubmarine Command and later, the US Navy conducting patrols along all three American coasts and the Canal Zone. The RAF and later American patrols ranged from the east, based in Northern Ireland, Scotland, Iceland and beginning in mid-1943 from the Azores. This role was dangerous, especially after many U-boats were armed with extra anti-aircraft guns, some adopting the policy of staying on the surface to fight, rather than submerging and risking being sunk by aerial weapons such as rockets, gunfire, torpedoes and depth charges from the bombers. American Liberators flew from Nova Scotia, Greenland, the Azores, Bermuda, the Bahamas, Puerto Rico, Cuba, Panama, Trinidad, Ascension Island and from wherever else they could fly far out over the Atlantic.

The sudden and decisive turning of the Battle of the Atlantic in favor of the Allies in May 1943 was the result of many factors. The gradual arrival of many more VLR and in October, PB4Y navalized Liberators for anti-submarine missions over the Mid-Atlantic gap ("black pit") and the Bay of Biscay was an important contribution to the Allies' greater success. Liberators were credited in full or in part with sinking 93 U-boats. The B-24 was vital for missions of a radius less than 1,000 mi (1,600 km), in both the Atlantic and Pacific theaters where US Navy PB4Y-1s and USAAF SB-24s took a heavy toll of enemy submarines and surface combatants and shipping.

=== USAAF ===
==== Introduction to service, 1941–1942 ====
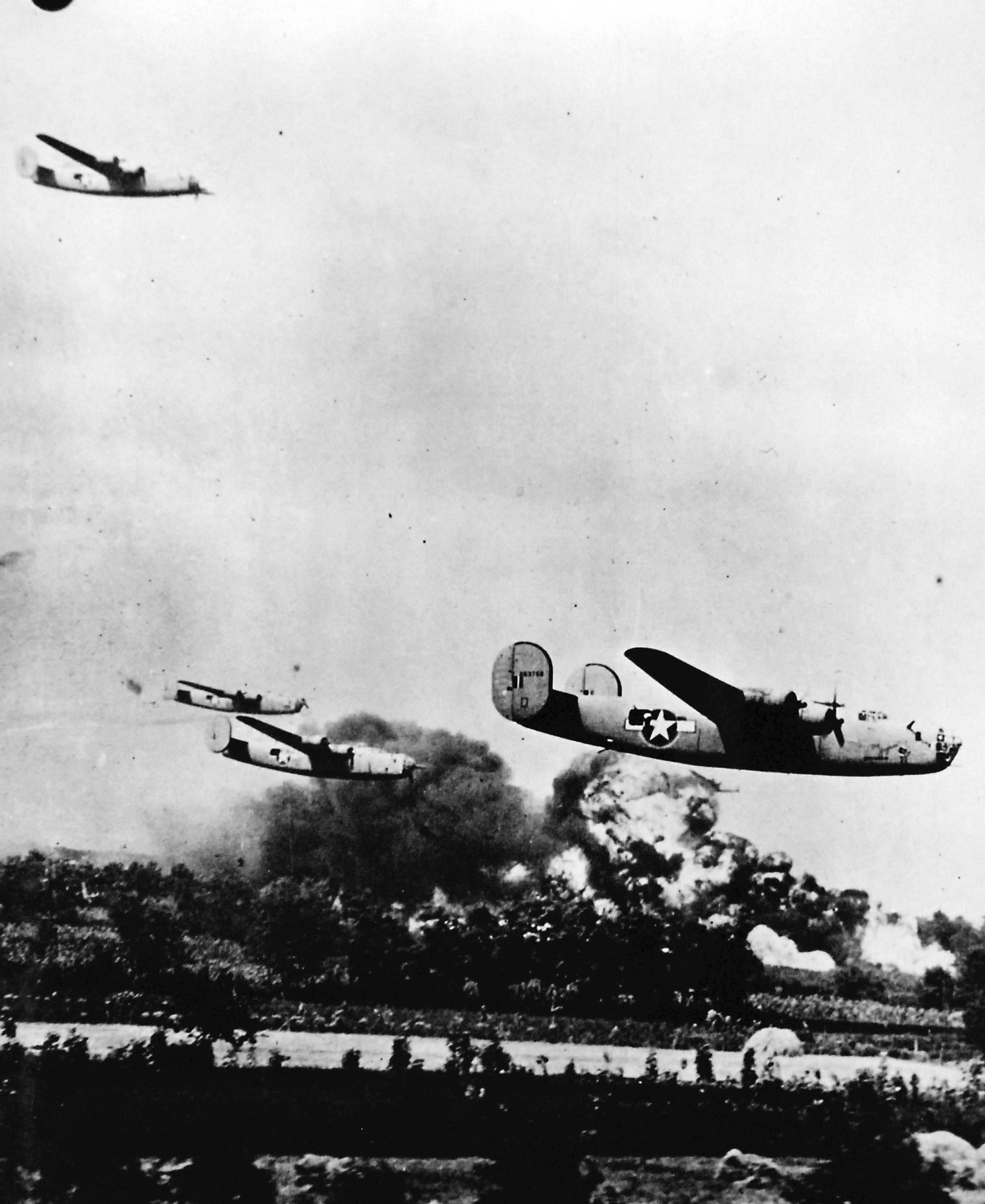
B-24s bomb the Ploiești oil fields in August 1943.

The United States Army Air Forces (USAAF) took delivery of its first B-24As in mid-1941. Over the next three years, B-24 squadrons deployed to all theaters of the war: African, European, China-Burma-India, the anti-submarine campaign, the Southwest Pacific and the Pacific. In the Pacific, to simplify logistics and to take advantage of its longer range, the B-24 (and its twin, the US Navy PB4Y) was the chosen standard heavy bomber. By mid-1943, the shorter-range B-17 was phased out. The Liberators which had served early in the war in the Pacific continued their efforts from the Philippines, Australia, Espiritu Santo, Guadalcanal, Hawaii, and Midway Island. The Liberator peak overseas deployment was 45.5 bomb groups in June 1944. Additionally, the Liberator equipped a number of independent squadrons in a variety of special combat roles. The cargo versions, C-87 and C-109 tanker, further increased its overseas presence, especially in Asia in support of the XX Bomber Command air offensive against Japan.

So vital was the need for long-range operations that at first USAAF used the type as transports. The sole B-24 in Hawaii was destroyed by the Japanese attack on Pearl Harbor on 7 December 1941. It had been sent to the Central Pacific for a very long-range reconnaissance mission that was preempted by the Japanese attack.

The first USAAF Liberators to carry out combat missions were 12 repossessed LB-30s deployed to Java with the 11th Bombardment Squadron (7th Bombardment Group) that flew their first combat mission in mid-January. Two were shot up by Japanese fighters, but both managed to land safely. One was written off due to battle damage and the other crash-landed on a beach.

US-based Liberators entered combat service in 1942 when on 6 June, four LB-30s from Hawaii staging through Midway Island attempted an attack on Wake Island, but were unable to find it. The B-24 came to dominate the heavy bombardment role in the Pacific because compared to the B-17, the B-24 was faster, had longer range, and could carry a ton more bombs.

==== Strategic bombing, 1942–1945 ====
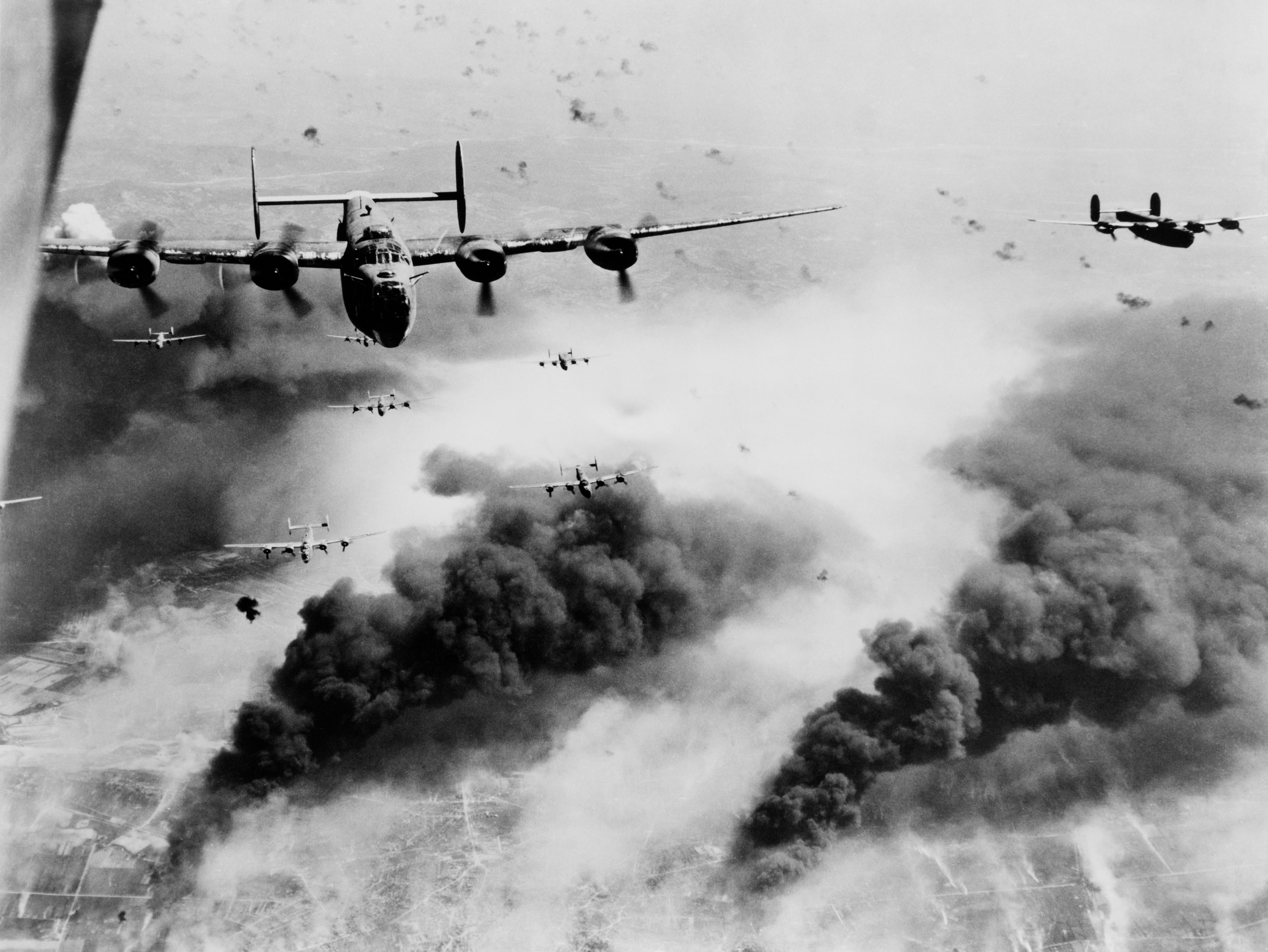
15th Air Force B-24s attacking the Concordia Vega Oil refinery, Ploiești, Romania fly through flak and over the destruction created by preceding waves of bombers, May 31, 1944.

On 12 June 1942, 13 B-24s of the Halverson Project (HALPRO) flying from Egypt attacked the Axis-controlled oil fields and refineries around Ploiești, Romania. Within weeks, the First Provisional Bombardment Group formed from the remnants of the Halverson and China detachments. This unit then was formalized as the 376th Bombardment Group, Heavy, and along with the 98th BG formed the nucleus of the IX Bomber Command of the Ninth Air Force, operating from Africa until absorbed into the Twelfth Air Force briefly, and then the Fifteenth Air Force, operating from Italy. The Ninth Air Force moved to England in late 1943. This was a major component of the USSTAF and took a major role in strategic bombing. Fifteen of the 15th AF's 21 bombardment groups flew B-24s.

For much of 1944, the B-24 was the predominant bomber of US Strategic Air Forces (USSTAF) formerly the Eighth Air Force in the Combined Bomber Offensive against Germany, forming nearly half of its heavy bomber strength in the ETO prior to August and most of the Italian-based force. Thousands of B-24s flying from bases in Europe dropped hundreds of thousands of tons of high explosive and incendiary bombs on German military, industrial, and civilian targets.

The 44th Bombardment Group was one of the first two heavy bombardment groups flying the B-24 with the 8th Air Force in the fall/winter air campaigns in the European Theater of Operations. The 44th Bomb Group flew the first of its 344 combat missions against the Axis powers in World War II on 7 November 1942.

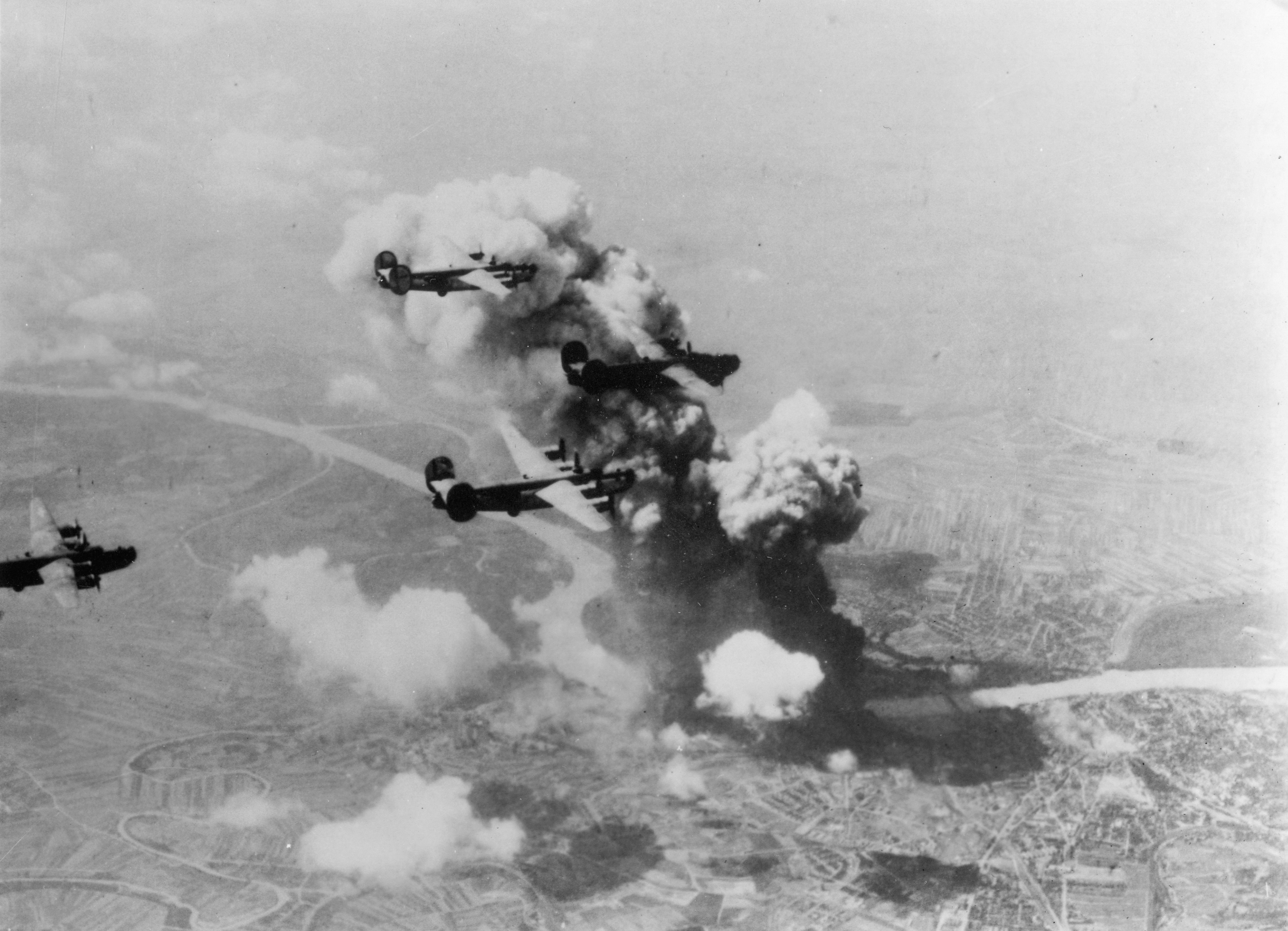
15th Air Force B-24s attacking the Apollo oil refinery in Bratislava, Slovakia, June 16, 1944.

The first B-24 loss over German territory occurred on 26 February 1943. Earlier in the war, both the Luftwaffe and the Royal Air Force had abandoned daylight bombing raids because neither could sustain the losses suffered. The Americans persisted, however, at great cost in men and aircraft. In the period between 7 November 1942 and 8 March 1943, the 44th Bomb Group lost 13 of its original 27 B-24s. For some time, newspapers had been requesting permission for a reporter to go on one of the missions. Robert B. Post and five other reporters of The New York Times were granted permission. Post was the only reporter assigned to a B-24-equipped group, the 44th Bomb Group. He flew in B-24 41-23777 ("Maisey") on Mission No. 37 to Bremen, Germany. Intercepted just short of the target, the B-24 came under attack from JG 1's Messerschmitt Bf 109s. Leutnant Heinz Knoke (who finished the war with 31 kills) shot down the Liberator. Post and all but 2 of the 11 men aboard were killed. Knoke reported: "The fire spread out along the right wing. The inboard propeller windmilled to a stop. And then, suddenly, the whole wing broke off. At an altitude of 900 metres there was a tremendous explosion. The bomber had disintegrated. The blazing wreckage landed just outside Bad Zwischenahn airfield."

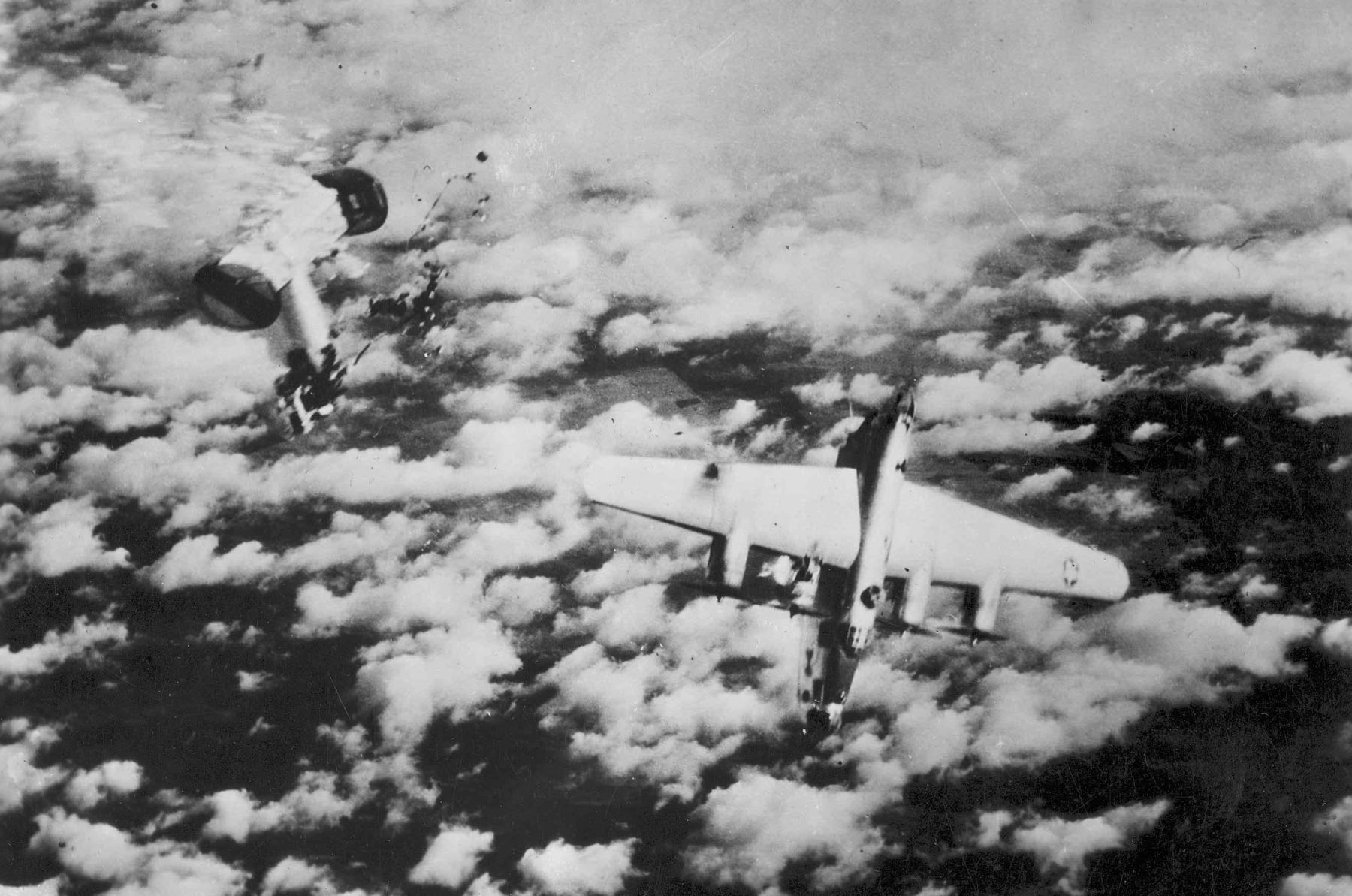
A B-24M of the 448th Bombardment Group, breaks in half after attack by a Messerschmitt Me 262 jet fighter

A total of 177 B-24s carried out the famous second attack on Ploiești (Operation Tidal Wave) on 1 August 1943. This was the B-24's most costly mission. In late June 1943, the three B-24 Liberator groups of the 8th Air Force were sent to North Africa on temporary duty with the 9th Air Force: the 44th Bomb Group joined the 93rd and the 389th Bomb Groups. These three units then joined the two 9th Air Force B-24 Liberator groups for low-level attack on the Romanian oil complex at Ploiești. This daring assault by high-altitude bombers at treetop level was a costly success. The attack became disorganized after a navigational error which alerted the defenders and protracted the bomb run from the initial point. The 44th destroyed both of its assigned targets, but lost 11 of its 37 bombers and their crews. Colonel Leon W. Johnson, the 44th's commander, was awarded the Medal of Honor for his leadership, as was Col. John Riley "Killer" Kane, commander of the 98th Bomb Group. Kane and Johnson survived the mission but three other recipients of the Medal of Honor for their actions in the mission—Lt. Lloyd H. Hughes, Maj. John L. Jerstad and Col. Addison E. Baker—were killed in action. For its actions on the Ploiești mission, the 44th was awarded its second Distinguished Unit Citation. Of the 177 B-24s that were dispatched on this operation, 54 were lost.

==== Radar/Electronic warfare and PGM deployment ====
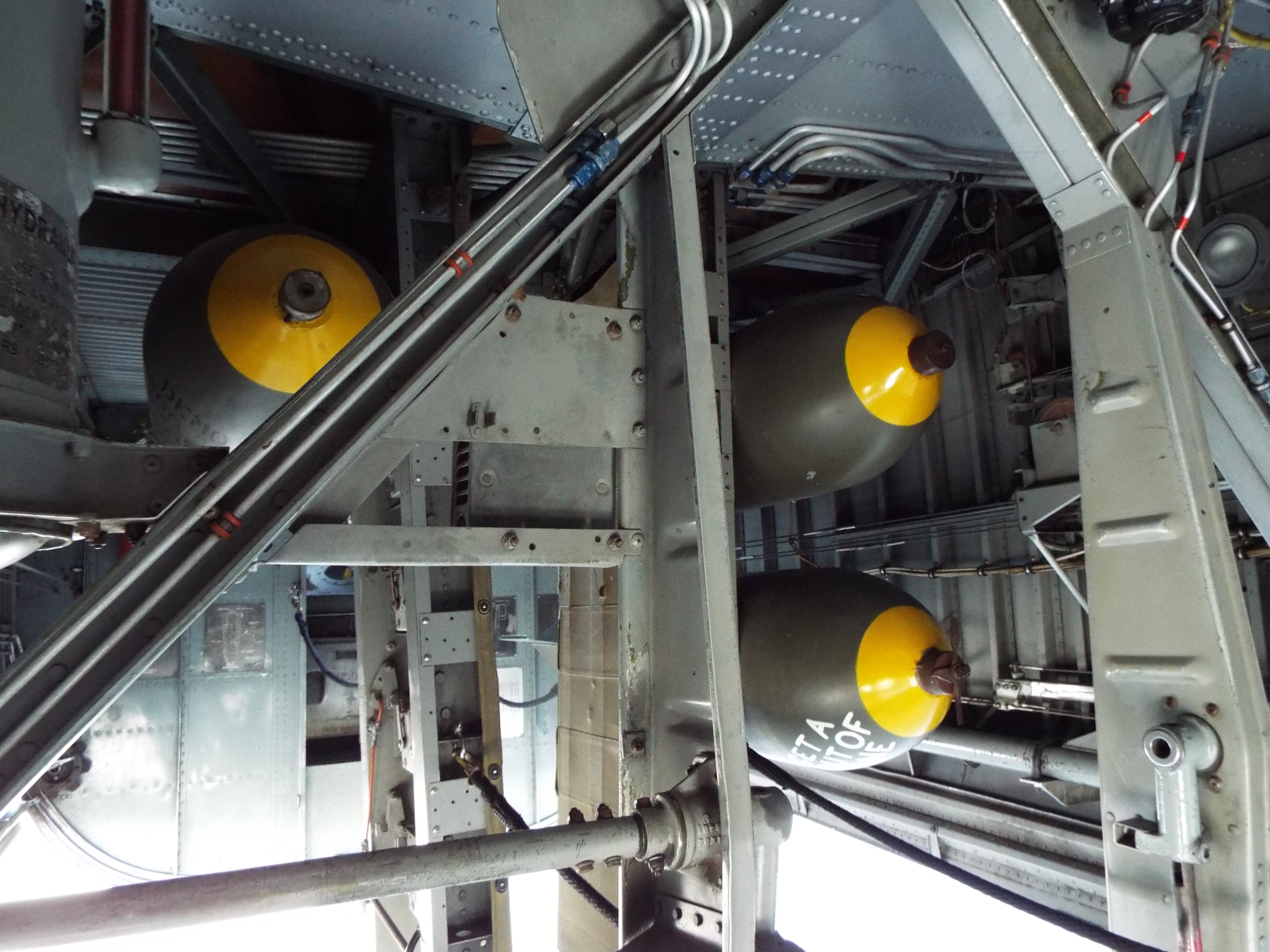
The bomb bay of a surviving B-24J Liberator in 2016

The B-24 advanced the use of electronic warfare and equipped Search Bomber (SB), Low Altitude (LAB) and Radar Counter Measure (RCM) squadrons in addition to high-altitude bombing. Among the specialized squadrons were the 20th RS (RCM), 36th BS (RCM), 406th NLS, 63rd BS (SB) SeaHawks, 373rdBS (LAB) and 868th BS (SB) Snoopers.

The 36th Bombardment Squadron was the Eighth Air Force's only electronic warfare squadron using specially equipped B-24s to jam German VHF communications during large Eighth Air Force daylight raids. In addition, the 36th BS flew night missions with RAF Bomber Command's own electronic warfare unit 100 Group at RAF Sculthorpe. Radar Counter Measures (RCM) was code-named Carpet, however, this should not be confused with agent and supply drops, code-named "Carpetbaggers".

The B-24 was the platform for the pioneering use of the Americans' Azon laterally-guidable precision-guided munition ordnance design, a pioneering Allied radio-guided munition system during World War II. The ordnance which weighed 1,000 pounds (450 kg), was deployed operationally by USAAF B-24s in both Europe and the CBI theaters. The Eighth Air Force's 458th Bombardment Group deployed the guided Azon ordnance in Europe between June and September 1944, while the Tenth Air Force's 493rd Bomb Squadron employed it against Japanese railroad bridges on the Burma Railway in early 1945, fulfilling the intended original purpose of the Azon system.

==== Assembly ships ====
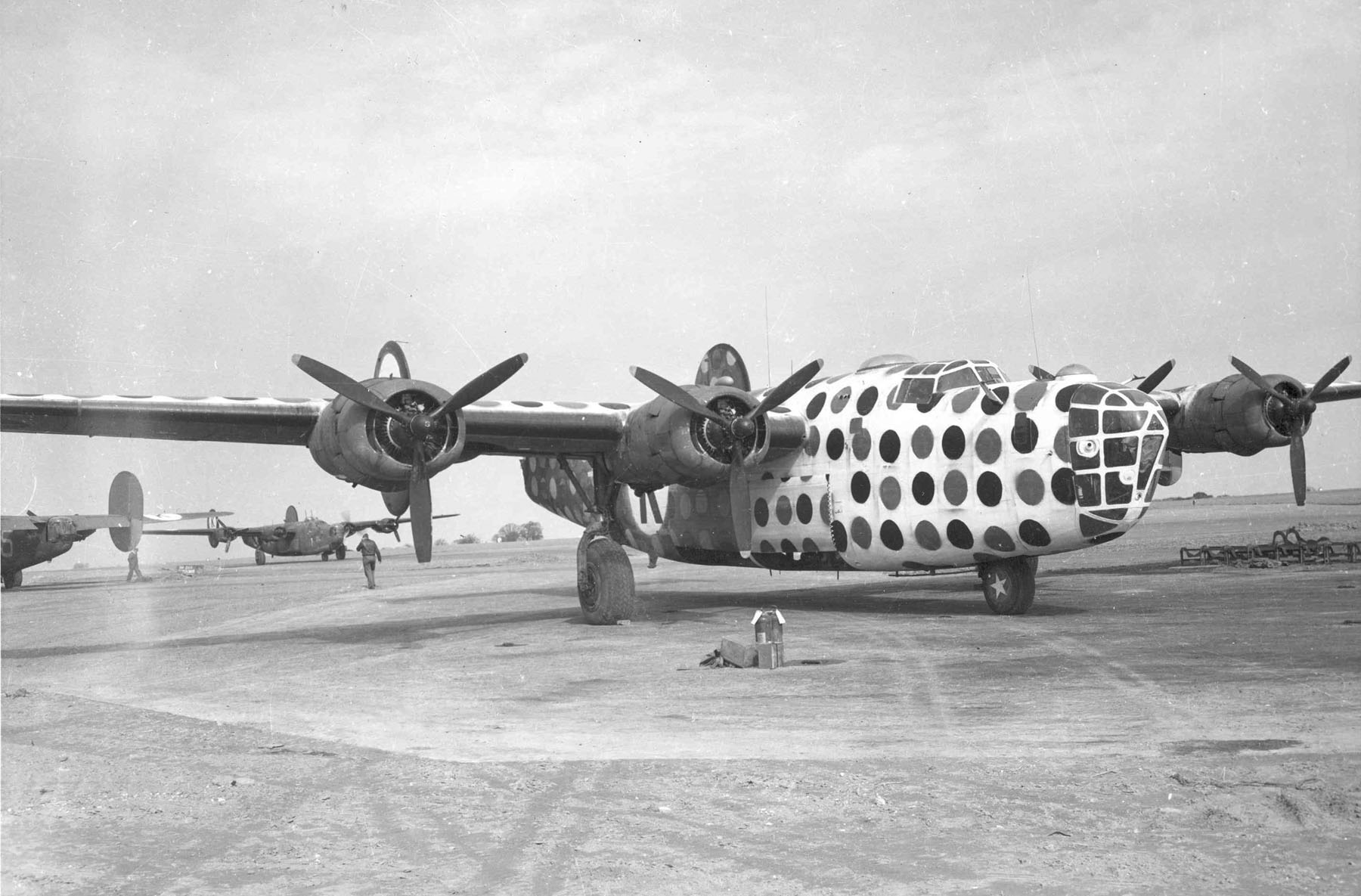
The assembly ship First Sergeant of the 458th Bomb Group at RAF Horsham St Faith had participated in Operation Tidal Wave.

In February 1944, the 2nd Division authorized the use of "Assembly Ships" (or "Formation Ships") specially fitted to aid the assembly of individual group formations. They were equipped with signal lighting, provision for quantity discharge of pyrotechnics, and were painted with distinctive group-specific high-contrast patterns of stripes, checkers or polka dots to enable easy recognition by their flock of bombers. The aircraft used in the first allocation were B-24Ds retired by the 44th, 93rd and 389th Groups. Arrangements for signal lighting varied from group to group, but generally consisted of white flashing lamps on both sides of the fuselage arranged to form the identification letter of the group. All armament and armor were removed and in some cases the tail turret. In the B-24Hs used for this purpose, the nose turret was removed and replaced by a "carpetbagger" type nose. Following incidents when flare guns were accidentally discharged inside the rear fuselage, some assembly (formation) ships had pyrotechnic guns fixed through the fuselage sides. As these aircraft normally returned to base once a formation had been established, a skeleton crew of two pilots, navigator, radio operator and one or two flare discharge operators were carried. In some groups an observer officer flew in the tail position to monitor the formation. These aircraft became known as Judas goats.

==== "Carpetbaggers" ====
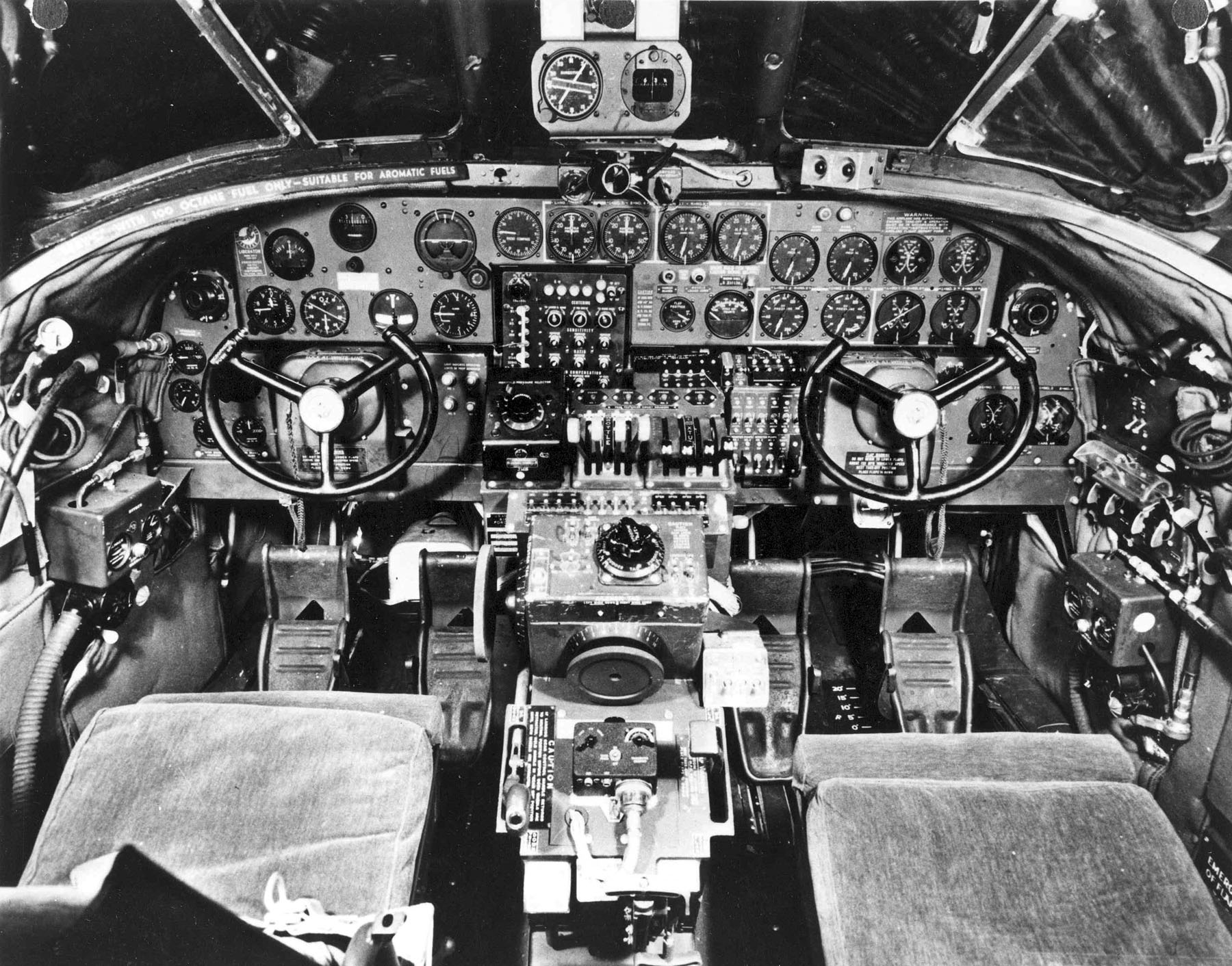
B-24 cockpit

From August 1943 until the end of the war in Europe, specially modified B-24Ds were used in classified missions. In a joint venture between the Army Air Forces and the Office of Strategic Services (OSS) code-named Operation Carpetbagger, pilots and crews flew specially modified B-24Ds painted with a glossy black anti-searchlight paint to supply friendly underground forces throughout German-occupied Europe. They also flew Douglas C-47s, Douglas A-26 Invaders, and British de Havilland Mosquitos.

Carpetbagger aircraft flew spies called "Joes" and commando groups prior to the Allied invasion of Europe on D-Day and afterward, and retrieved over 5,000 officers and enlisted men who had escaped capture after being shot down. The low-altitude, nighttime operation was extremely dangerous and took its toll on these airmen. The first aircrews chosen for this operation came from the anti-submarine bomb groups because of their special training in low altitude flying and pinpoint navigation skills. Because of their special skills, they were called upon to fly fuel to General George Patton's army during the summer and early autumn of 1944 when it outran its fuel supply. When this mission was completed, it was recorded that 822,791 US gallons (3,114,264 L) of 80 octane gasoline had been delivered to three different airfields in France and Belgium.

The 859 BS was converted from day bombardment to these operations and then transferred to the 15th Air Force.

=== Transport variants ===
==== C-87 Liberator Express ====
In early 1942, with the need for a purpose-built transport with better high-altitude performance and longer range than the Douglas C-47 Skytrain, the San Diego plant began sending B-24D models to Fort Worth for conversion into the C-87 transport. The conversion had a hinged cargo door at the nose eliminating transparent nose and large cargo doors installed in the waist area. The C-87 had a large cargo floor, less powerful supercharged engines, no gun turrets, a floor in the bomb bay for freight, and some side windows. The navigator's position was relocated behind the pilot. Indigenous Fort Worth C-87 and AT-22 production began with the FY 1943 order for 80 serial-numbered airframes 43-30548 through 43–30627.

The C-87A was a dedicated VIP series built in small quantity. Early versions were fitted with a single .50 caliber (12.7 mm) Browning machine gun in their tails, and a XC-87B version proposed two .50 caliber fixed machine guns for the nose, operable by the pilot, though these were eventually removed. The XC-87B also designated a resurrected crash victim B-24D (42-40355) fitted with low altitude power packages and a forward fuselage extension. The extended nose earned it the name Pinocchio. Later modifications gave it a single tail and yet another type of engine packages bring it to near C-87C configuration. Other C-87 designations were the US Navy designation RY and Lend Lease Liberator Cargo VII.

Although only 287 C-87 and eight US Navy RY variants were produced, they were still important in the Army Air Forces' airlift operations early in the war when aircraft with high-altitude, long-range heavy hauling abilities were in short supply. The C-87 flew in many theaters of war, including much hazardous duty in flights from Labrador to Greenland and Iceland in the North Atlantic. In the China Burma India Theater (CBI), the C-87 was used to airlift cargo and fuel over the Hump (the Himalayas) from India to China. Early in the campaign, the C-87 was the only readily available American transport that could fly over the Himalayas while heavily loaded, rather than relying on circuitous and highly dangerous routes through valleys and mountain passes, but the type was not very popular with crews: they complained of various hazards including the fuel system, engines and cockpit accessories, while the type was notorious for leaking fuel tanks and mid-air fires a constant danger. The C-87 also shared the Liberator's dangerous sensitivity to icing, particularly prevalent over Himalayan routes. With these difficulties in mind it is little wonder the ATC India China Division was the only unit in the Command to be combat decorated during World War II, having been awarded a Distinguished Unit Citation.

The C-87 was not always popular with the aircrews assigned to fly it. The aircraft had the distressing habit of losing all cockpit electrical power on takeoff or at landings, its engine power and reliability with the less-powerful superchargers also often left much to be desired. It proved to be quite vulnerable to icing conditions, and was prone to fall into a spin with even small amounts of ice accumulated onto its Davis wing. Since the aircraft had been designed to be a bomber that dropped its loads while airborne, the C-87's nose landing gear was not designed for landing with a heavy load, and frequently it collapsed from the stress. Fuel leaks inside the crew compartment from the hastily modified long-range fuel system were an all-too-common occurrence. Lastly, unlike a typical purpose-designed transport, the B-24 was not designed to tolerate large loading variations because most of its load was held on fixed bomb racks. Consequently, it was relatively easy for a poorly trained ground crew to load a C-87 with its center of gravity too far forward or aft, rendering the aircraft difficult to control due to inadequate or excessive longitudinal stability. In his autobiography, Fate is the Hunter, the writer Ernest K. Gann reported that, while flying air cargo in India, he barely avoided crashing an improperly loaded C-87 into the Taj Mahal. As soon as more dependable Douglas C-54 Skymaster and Curtiss-Wright C-46 Commando transports became available in large numbers, C-87s were rapidly phased out of combat zone service, with some later used as VIP transports or B-24 flight crew trainers.

==== C-109 version ====
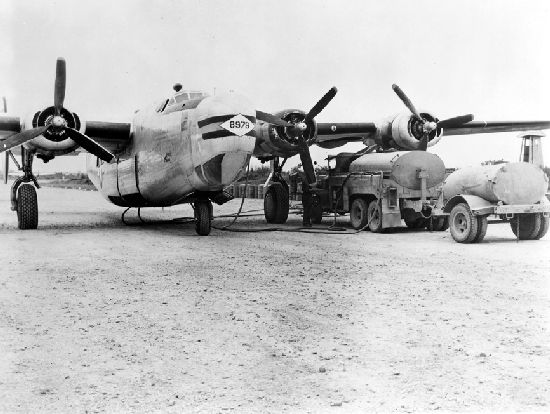
C-109 tanker unloading

The C-109 was a dedicated fuel transport version of the B-24 conceived as a support aircraft for Boeing B-29 Superfortress operations in central China. Unlike the C-87, the C-109 was not built on the assembly line, but rather was converted from existing B-24 bomber production; to save weight, the glass nose, armament, turret fairings and bombardment equipment were removed. Several storage tanks were added, allowing a C-109 to carry 2,900 gal (11,000 L) of fuel weighing over 22,000 pounds (10,000 kg).

Plans originally called for 2,000 C-109s to support 10 groups of B-29s (approximately 400) in China, but the capture of the Mariana Islands provided a far more easily resupplied location for raids on mainland Japan, and the plans were greatly scaled back. Only 218 C-109s were actually converted. After the transfer of the B-29s, the C-109s were reassigned to the Air Transport Command. According to the history of the US Army Air Forces in World War II, at least one squadron was assigned to the IX Troop Carrier Command in Europe to transport gasoline to advancing ground and air forces on the Continent after the Normandy invasion.

However, whereas a combat-loaded B-24 could safely take off with room to spare from a 6,000 ft (1,800 m) runway, a loaded C-109 required every foot of such a runway to break ground, and crashes on takeoff were not uncommon. The aircraft demonstrated unstable flight characteristics with all storage tanks filled, and proved very difficult to land fully loaded at airfields above 6,000 ft (1,800 m) MSL in elevation, such as those around Chengdu. After it was discovered that these problems could be alleviated by flying with the forward storage tank empty, this practice became fairly routine, enhancing aircrew safety at the cost of some fuel-carrying capacity. Many C-109s were lost in flying the Hump airlift to China.

The Singing Cowboy Gene Autry served in the Air Transport Command (in the same squadron as Barry Goldwater), and described flying the C-109 over "The Hump" as "the thrill that lasts a lifetime".

B-24 bombers were also extensively used in the Pacific area after the end of World War II to transport cargo and supplies during the rebuilding of Japan, China, and the Philippines.

=== US Navy and US Marine Corps ===
==== PB4Y-1 ====
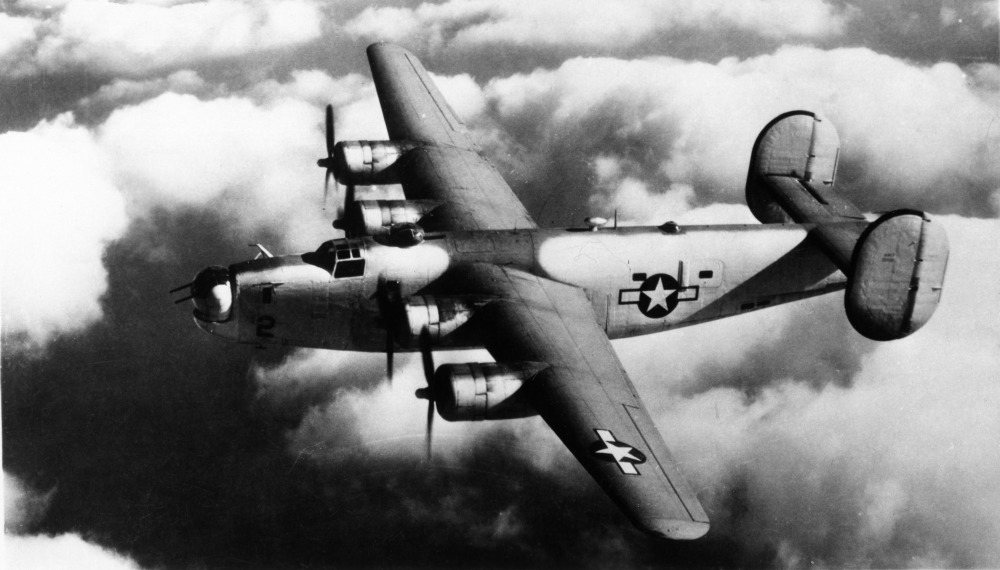
PB4Y-1 Liberator

B-24s were also used by the US Navy and US Marine Corps for ASW, anti-ship patrol, and photographic reconnaissance in the Pacific Theater, and by the US Coast Guard for patrol and SAR. Naval B-24s were redesignated PB4Y-1, meaning the fourth patrol bomber design built by Consolidated Aircraft. Navy PB4Y-1s assigned to Atlantic ASW and all Coast Guard PB4Y-1s had the ventral turret replaced by a retractable radome. Also, most naval aircraft had an Erco ball turret installed in the nose position, replacing the glass nose and other styles of turret.

The Consolidated Aircraft Company PB4Y-2 Privateer was a US Navy patrol bomber that was derived directly from the B-24 Liberator. The US Navy had been using B-24s with only minor modifications as the PB4Y-1 Liberator, and along with maritime patrol B-24s used by RAF Coastal Command this type of patrol plane had been quite successful. A fully navalized design was seen as advantageous, and Consolidated Aircraft developed a purpose-built long-range patrol bomber in 1943, designated PB4Y-2. The Privateer had non-turbosupercharged engines for weight savings and optimal performance at low to medium patrol altitudes, and was visually distinguishable from the B-24 and PB4Y-1 by its longer fuselage, single tall vertical stabilizer (rather than a twin tail), two dorsal turrets, and teardrop-shaped waist gun blisters (similar in appearance to those on Consolidated's own PBY Catalina).

=== Australia ===
==== RAAF ====
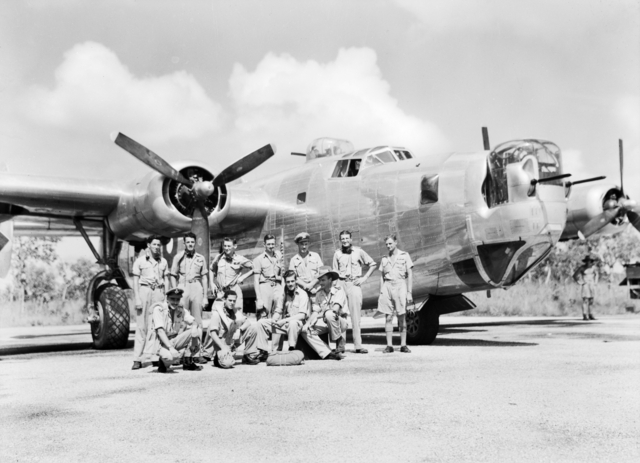
The crew of a No. 21 Squadron RAAF Liberator with their aircraft

Australian aircrew seconded to the Royal Air Force flew Liberators in all theatres of the war, including with RAF Coastal Command, in the Middle East, and with South East Asia Command, while some flew in South African Air Force squadrons. Liberators were introduced into service in the Royal Australian Air Force (RAAF) in 1944, after the American commander of the Far East Air Forces (FEAF), General George C. Kenney, suggested that seven heavy bomber squadrons be raised to supplement the efforts of American Liberator squadrons. The USAAF transferred some aircraft to the RAAF, while the remainder would be delivered from the US under Lend-Lease. Some RAAF aircrew were given operational experience in Liberators while attached to USAAF squadrons. Seven flying squadrons, an operational training unit, and two special duties flights were equipped with the aircraft by the end of World War II in August 1945.

The RAAF Liberators saw service in the South West Pacific theatre of World War II. Flying mainly from bases in the Northern Territory, Queensland and Western Australia, aircraft conducted bombing raids against Japanese positions, ships and strategic targets in New Guinea, Borneo and the Netherlands East Indies. In addition, the small number of Liberators operated by No. 200 Flight played an important role in supporting covert operations conducted by the Allied Intelligence Bureau; and other Liberators were converted to VIP transports. A total of 287 B-24D, B-24J, B-24L and B-24M aircraft were supplied to the RAAF, of which 33 were lost in action or accidents, with more than 200 Australians killed. Following the Japanese surrender, the RAAF's Liberators participated in flying former prisoners of war and other personnel back to Australia. Liberators remained in service until 1948, when they were replaced by Avro Lincolns.

==== Qantas ====
In June 1944, Qantas Empire Airways began service with the first of two converted LB-30 Liberators on the Perth to Colombo route to augment PBY Catalinas that had been used since May 1943. The Double Sunrise route across the Indian Ocean was 3,513 mi (5,654 km) long, the longest non-stop airline route in the world at the time. The Liberators flew a shorter 3,077 mi (4,952 km) over-water route from Learmonth to an airfield northeast of Colombo, but they could make the flight in 17 hours with a 5,500-pound (2,500 kg) payload, whereas the Catalinas required 27 hours and had to carry so much auxiliary fuel that their payload was limited to only 1,000 pounds (450 kg). The route was named Kangaroo Service and marked the first time that Qantas's now-famous Kangaroo logo was used; passengers received a certificate proclaiming them as members of The Order of the Longest Hop. The Liberators were later replaced by Avro Lancastrians.

=== SAAF ===
Two squadrons of the South African Air Force (SAAF) also flew B-24s: 31 and 34 Squadrons under No 2 Wing SAAF based at Foggia, Italy. These two squadrons engaged in relief flights to Warsaw and Kraków in Poland to support the Polish Uprising against Nazi Occupation.

=== Luftwaffe use ===
Three B-24s were captured and then operated by the German secret operations unit KG 200, which also tested, evaluated and sometimes clandestinely operated captured enemy aircraft during World War II.

One of these was captured at Venegono, Italy, on 29 March 1944. It was used on penetration missions in RAF bomber streams at night in Luftwaffe markings. On a ferry flight from Hildesheim to Bavaria on 6 April 1945, it was shot down – by German anti-aircraft fire.

Crashed B-24s were the source of the landing gear units for the strictly experimental Junkers Ju 287 V1 first prototype jet bomber airframe in 1945.

=== Romanian use ===
Following Operation Tidal Wave, it was decided to attempt the salvage of a B-24 bomber and use it for fighter-pilot training. Three B-24s were recovered: Boiler Maker II, Honkey Tonk Gal, and Brewery Wagon. Of these, Boiler Maker II was repaired in the field using parts from the other two. Initially, the glazed nose of the bomber was replaced with sheet metal. The airplane was then flown to Brașov where it was painted in Romanian Air Force camouflage and markings at the IAR factory.

The aircraft was handed over for operations to the LARES airline. It was destroyed on the ground during a German raid on 26 August 1944.

Another proposal was to recover engines of other crashed B-24s and mount them on the IAR 80 fighters. However, the IAR engineers determined that the R-1830 engine did not offer any significant advantage over the IAR K14.

=== Soviet use ===
Only one B-24 was officially delivered to the USSR according to the Lend-Lease agreements, stranded in Yakutsk while flying a government mission to the Soviet Union in November 1942. In addition, 73 Liberators of various models that had force-landed on European airfields were recovered and 30 of them were repaired and used by the 45th Bomber Aviation Division. The regiment concerned appears to have been the 890th Bomber Aviation Regiment at Baranovichi until 1944, and then Kazan.

=== Chinese use ===
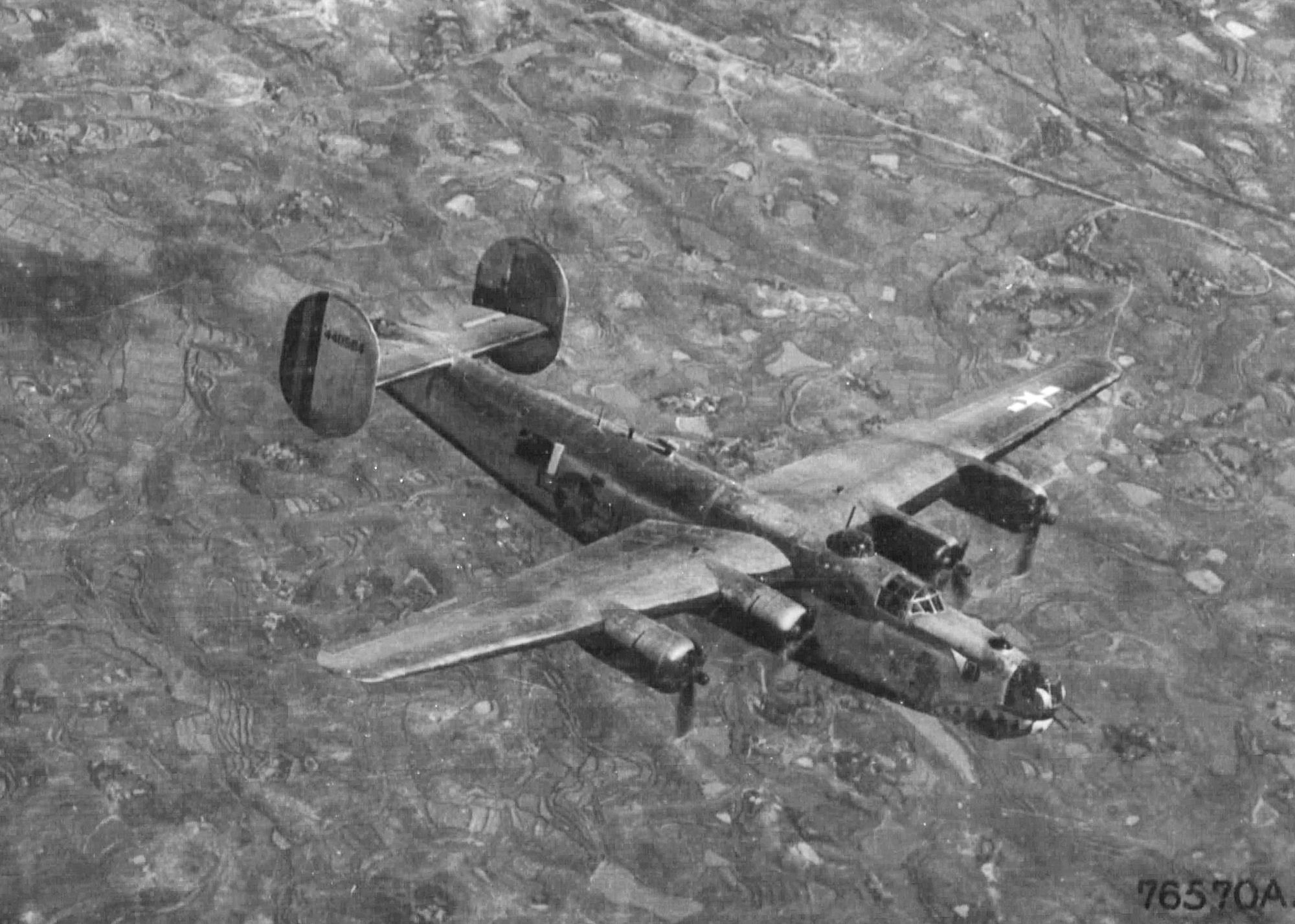
B-24 Bomber flying over China during WW2

The B-24 bombers of the 308th Bombardment Group (Heavy) joined the battlefield in March 1944 as the heavy bombers of the Fourteenth Air Force to fight against the Japanese during the Second Sino-Japanese War. About 48 B-24Ms were provided by the US to the Chinese Nationalist Air Force after World War II and were used during the Chinese Civil War. The PLAAF had two B-24Ms captured from the Chinese Nationalists during the Chinese Civil War and operated until 1952.

=== Indian use ===
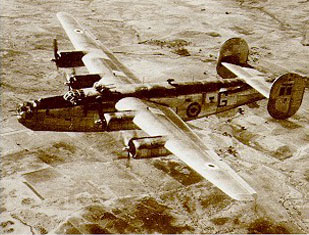
Refurbished IAF Liberator

In October 1944, two RAF Liberator squadrons (357 and 358) were deployed to Jessore, India, in support of British SAS, American OSS and French SIS underground operations throughout South East Asia. The aircraft were stripped of most armaments to allow for fuel for up to 26-hour return flights such as Jessore to Singapore. Liberators were also used as anti-submarine patrol aircraft by RAF Coastal Command. RAF Liberators were operated as bombers from India by SEAC and would have been a part of Tiger Force if the war had continued.

Following the conclusion of World War II, former USAF and RAF B-24's had been deployed in Ranchi, Panagarh, Dum-Dum, Kalaikunda, Salua, Chabua, Kumbhigram, and Jorhat in India. Most Liberators were flown back to Chakeri airbase in Kanpur, with the RIAF was given the task of disabling the 100-strong bomber fleet left in India. Following Indian independence and the First Kashmir war, the newly formed Indian Air Force was looking for heavy bombers. The sore lack of effective bombers had resulted in IAF Dakotas being modified to drop bombs. While the USAF initially proposed sale of surplus B-25 Mitchells, and the UK of Lancasters, Hindustan Aeronautics Limited was contracted to study the feseability repairing the B-24 fleet. Following crude and basic repairs on the fleet, which involved substituting the engines with ones salvaged from the C-47 Dakota and removal of undercarriage doors and some hydraulics and other systems, HAL test pilot Capt. Jamshed Kaikobad Munshi flew the bombers to HAL facilities in Bangalore for service restoration. RAF and USAF technicians also aided in the fleet restoration efforts and Crew training. Two C-87s were also salvaged for aerial surveying and VIP flights from Kanpur.

In this manner the IAF obtained 42 B-24 bombers of which 39 were deployed to the No.5 and No.6 squadrons after engineers at HAL restored the B-24 fleet to operational capacity in 1949. In 1957, the 5th squadron converted to English Electric Canberras and the remaining aircraft were fitted with the ASV-15 radar within an retractable radome in the bomb bay where the ball turret had originally been located to be used for reconnaissance and Maritime Patrol with the bomb racks removed and Sonobuoys and depth charges being installed. The fleet would be used on leaflet missions during Operation Vijay and conducted reconnaissance missions during the Sino-Indian war. They were maintained on high alert for use in the 1965 Indo-Pakistani war, but eventually were not used in active combat, instead patrolling the southern coasts of India. They were initially replaced by the English Electric Canberra, followed by the far smaller Su-7 and HF-24 fighter-bombers in service as well as the Lockheed Constellation, Tu-142 and Il-38 for patrol duties.

Six of the surviving 14 B-24s were obtained from the IAF upon the fleet's retirement in 1968.

== Production ==
External image
- Watch video of B-24 production and testing

Approximately 18,500 B-24s were produced across a number of versions, including over 4,600 manufactured by Ford. It holds records as the world's most-produced bomber, heavy bomber, multi-engine aircraft, and American military aircraft in history. Production took place at five plants. At Ford's Ypsilanti, Michigan based Willow Run Bomber plant alone, one B-24 was being produced every 59 minutes at its peak, a rate so large that production exceeded the military's ability to use the aircraft. Such were the production numbers it has been said that more aluminum, aircrew, and effort went into the B-24 than any other aircraft in history.

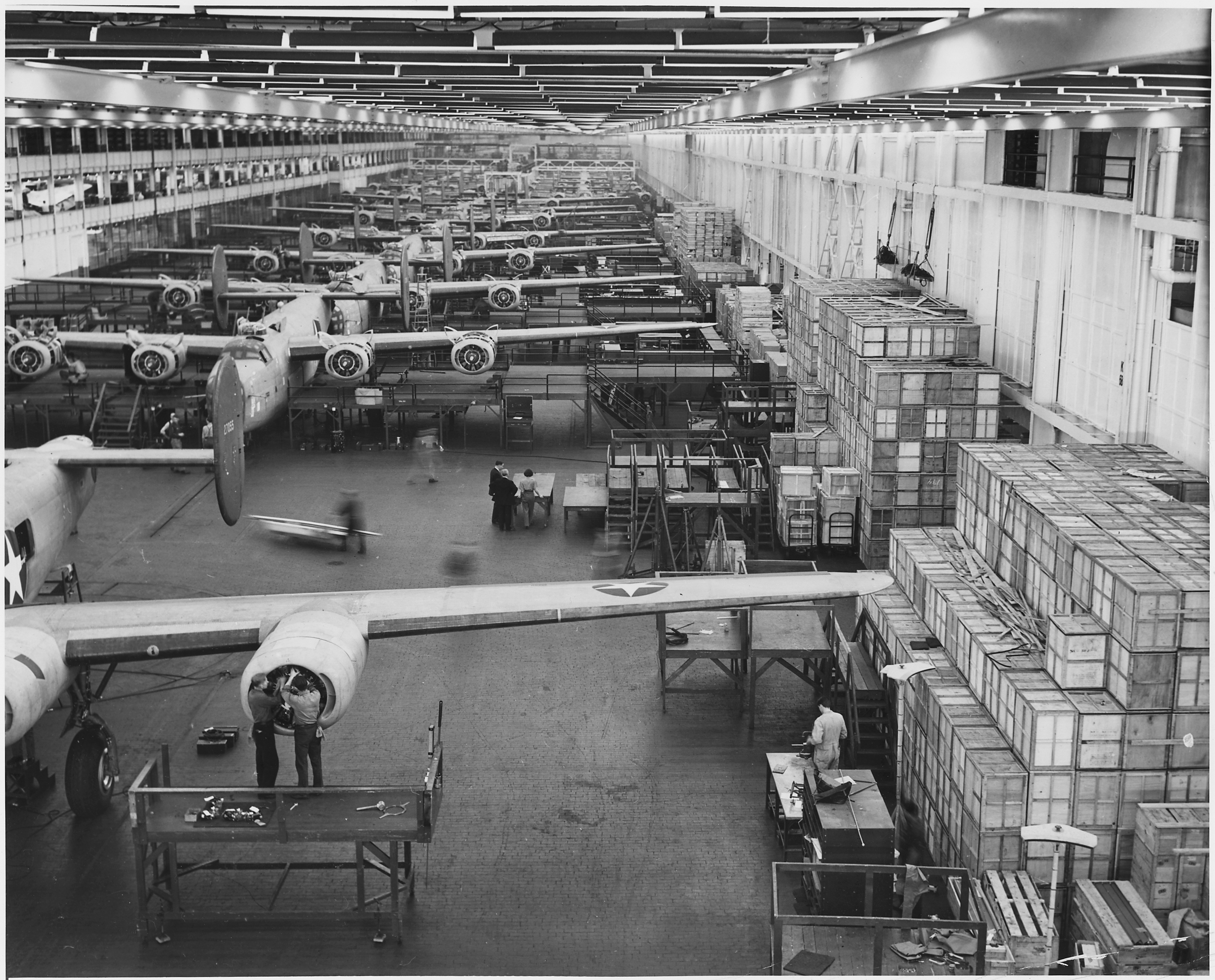
Looking up one of the assembly lines at Ford's big Willow Run plant, where B-24E (Liberator) bombers are being made

Continued development work by Consolidated produced a handful of transitional B-24Cs with turbocharged instead of supercharged engines. The turbocharged engines were the reason for the flattened oval shape of the nacelles that distinguished all subsequent Liberator models.

The B-24D was the first mass-produced series. The B-24D was the Liberator III in British service. It entered US service in early 1942. It had turbocharged engines and increased fuel capacity. Three more 0.50 caliber (12.7 mm) machine guns brought the defensive armament up to 10 machine guns. At 59,524 pounds (27,000 kg) (29.76 short tons) maximum takeoff weight, it was one of the heaviest aircraft in the world; comparable with the British "heavies", with fully loaded weights of 30 short tons for (and nearly identical to) the Stirling, the 34 short ton Lancaster and the 27 short ton Halifax.

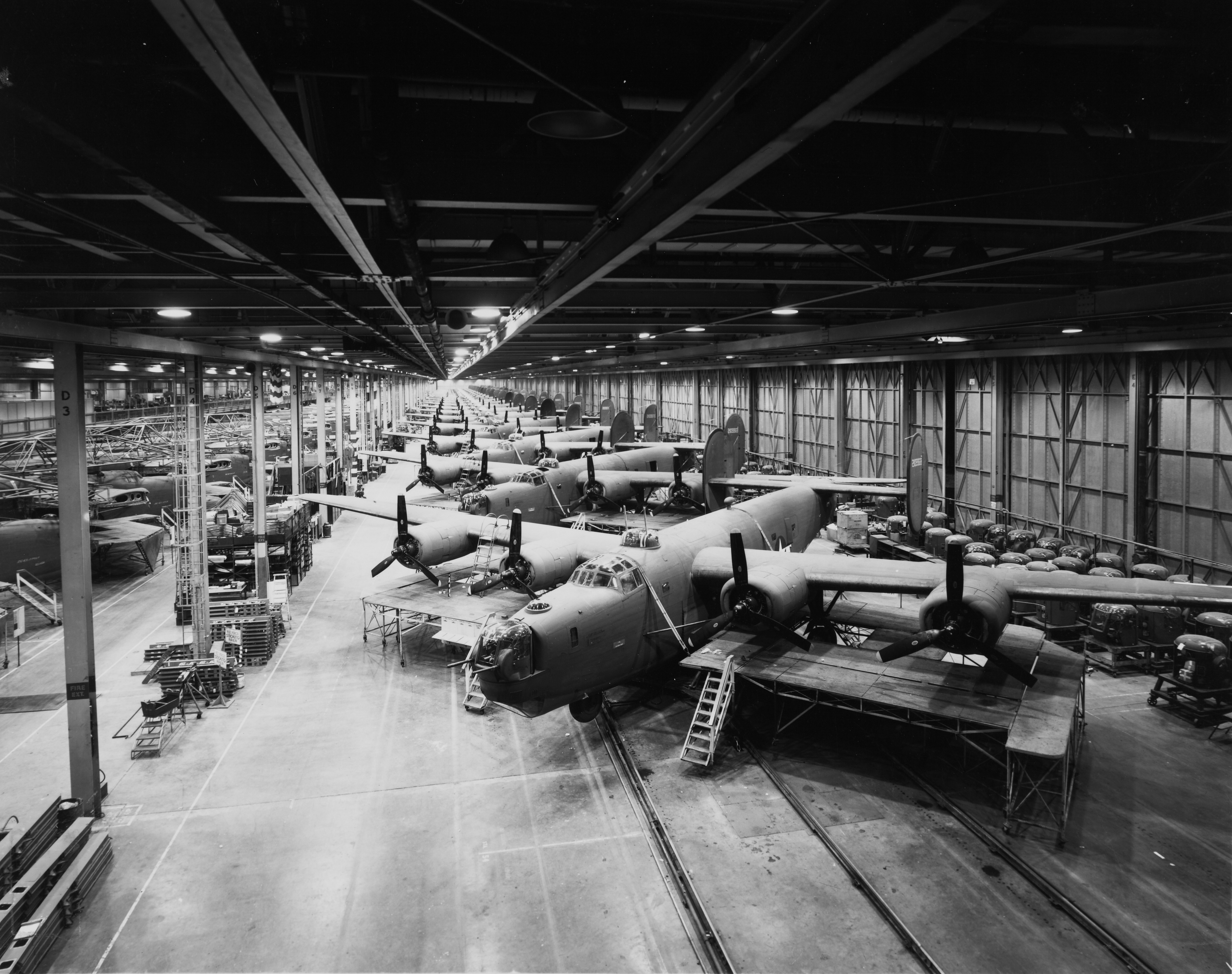
B-24s under construction at Ford Motor's Willow Run plant

Production of B-24s increased at an astonishing rate throughout 1942 and 1943. Consolidated Aircraft tripled the size of its plant in San Diego and built a large new plant outside Carswell Air Force Base in Fort Worth, Texas in order to receive the massive amounts of knock-down kits that the Ford Motor Company shipped via truck from its Ypsilanti Michigan Facility. A new government plant was built in Tulsa, Oklahoma with Reconstruction Finance Corporation funds and leased to Douglas Aircraft for assembly of B-24s from Ford parts; Douglas ultimately built a total of 962 of the D, E, H, and J models there. Bell Aircraft built the B-24 under license at a factory near Marietta, Georgia, just northwest of Atlanta. Online by mid-1943, the new plant produced hundreds of B-24 Liberator bombers. The aircraft was also built at North American plant B in the city of Grand Prairie, Texas having only starting production of the B-24G in 1943. None of these were minor operations, but they were dwarfed by Ford's vast new purpose-built factory constructed at Willow Run near Detroit, Michigan.

According to the Willow Run Reference Book published 1 February 1945, Ford broke ground on Willow Run on 18 April 1941, with the first plane coming off the line on 10 September 1942. Willow Run had the largest assembly line in the world (3,500,000 ft^{2} or 330,000 m^{2}). At its peak in 1944, the Willow Run plant produced 1 B-24 per hour and 650 B-24s per month. In mid-1944, the production of the B-24 was consolidated from several different companies (including some in Texas) to two large factories: the Consolidated Aircraft Company in San Diego and the Ford Motor Company's factory in Willow Run, near Detroit, Michigan, which had been specially designed to produce B-24s. By 1945, Ford made 70% of all B-24s in two nine-hour shifts. Pilots and crews slept on 1,300 cots at Willow Run waiting for their B-24s to roll off the assembly line. At Willow Run, Ford produced half of 18,000 total B-24s alone. Up into December 1944, Ford had also produced an additional 7242 KD or 'Knock Down' Kits that would be trucked to and assembled by Consolidated in Ft. Worth and Douglas Aircraft in Tulsa. Each of the B-24 factories was identified with a production code suffix: Consolidated/San Diego, CO; Consolidated/Fort Worth, CF; Ford/Willow Run, FO; North American, NT; and Douglas/Tulsa, DT.

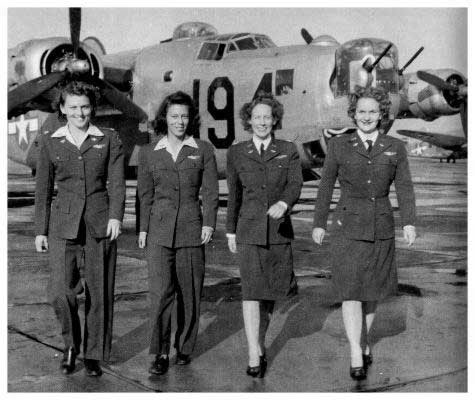
WASP pilots (left to right) Eloise Huffines Bailey, Millie Davidson Dalrymple, Elizabeth McKethan Magid and Clara Jo Marsh Stember, with a B-24 in the background

In 1943, the model of Liberator considered by many the "definitive" version was introduced. The B-24H was 10 inches (25 cm) longer, had a powered gun turret in the upper nose to reduce vulnerability to head-on attack, and was fitted with an improved bomb sight (behind a simpler, three-panel glazed lower nose), autopilot, and fuel transfer system. Consolidated, Douglas and Ford all manufactured the B-24H, while North American made the slightly different B-24G. All five plants switched over to the almost identical B-24J in August 1943. The later B-24L and B-24M were lighter-weight versions and differed mainly in defensive armament.

As the war progressed, the complexity of servicing the Liberator continued to increase. The B-24 variants made by each company differed slightly, so repair depots had to stock many different parts to support various models. Fortunately, this problem was eased in the summer of 1944, when North American, Douglas and Consolidated Aircraft at Fort Worth stopped making B-24s, leaving only the Consolidated plant in San Diego and the Ford plant in Willow Run.

In all, 18,482 B-24s were built by September 1945. Twelve thousand saw service with the USAAF, with a peak inventory in September 1944 of 6,043. The US Navy received 977 PB4Y-1s (Liberators originally ordered by the USAAF) and 739 PB4Y-2 Privateers, derived from the B-24. The Royal Air Force received about 2,100 B-24s equipping 46 bomber groups and 41 squadrons; the Royal Canadian Air Force 1,200 B-24Js; and the Royal Australian Air Force 287 B-24Js, B-24Ls, and B-24Ms. Liberators were the only heavy bomber flown by the RAAF in the Pacific.

== Variants ==
=== US Army Air Forces variants ===
XB-24
Single prototype ordered by Army Air Corps on 30 March 1939. Powered by four Pratt & Whitney R-1830-33 Twin Wasps rated at 1,200 horsepower (890 kW) for takeoff and 1,000 horsepower (750 kW) at 14,500 feet (4,400 m). Bombload of eight 1,000 lb (450 kg) bombs, with defensive armament of three 0.5 in (12.7 mm) and four 0.30 in (7.62 mm) machine guns. First flew 29 December 1939. Later converted to XB-24B.

YB-24/LB-30A
Pre-production prototypes, six of which were sold to the UK directly as the LB-30A. US funds and serial numbers were deferred to the B-24D production. The seventh (40-702) remained in US service as the sole YB-24 for service test. (Total: 7)

B-24
Ordered on 27 April 1939, less than 30 days after the XB-24 was ordered and before its completion. Minor modifications included eliminating leading-edge slots and adding de-icing boots. (Total: 1, converted YB-24.)

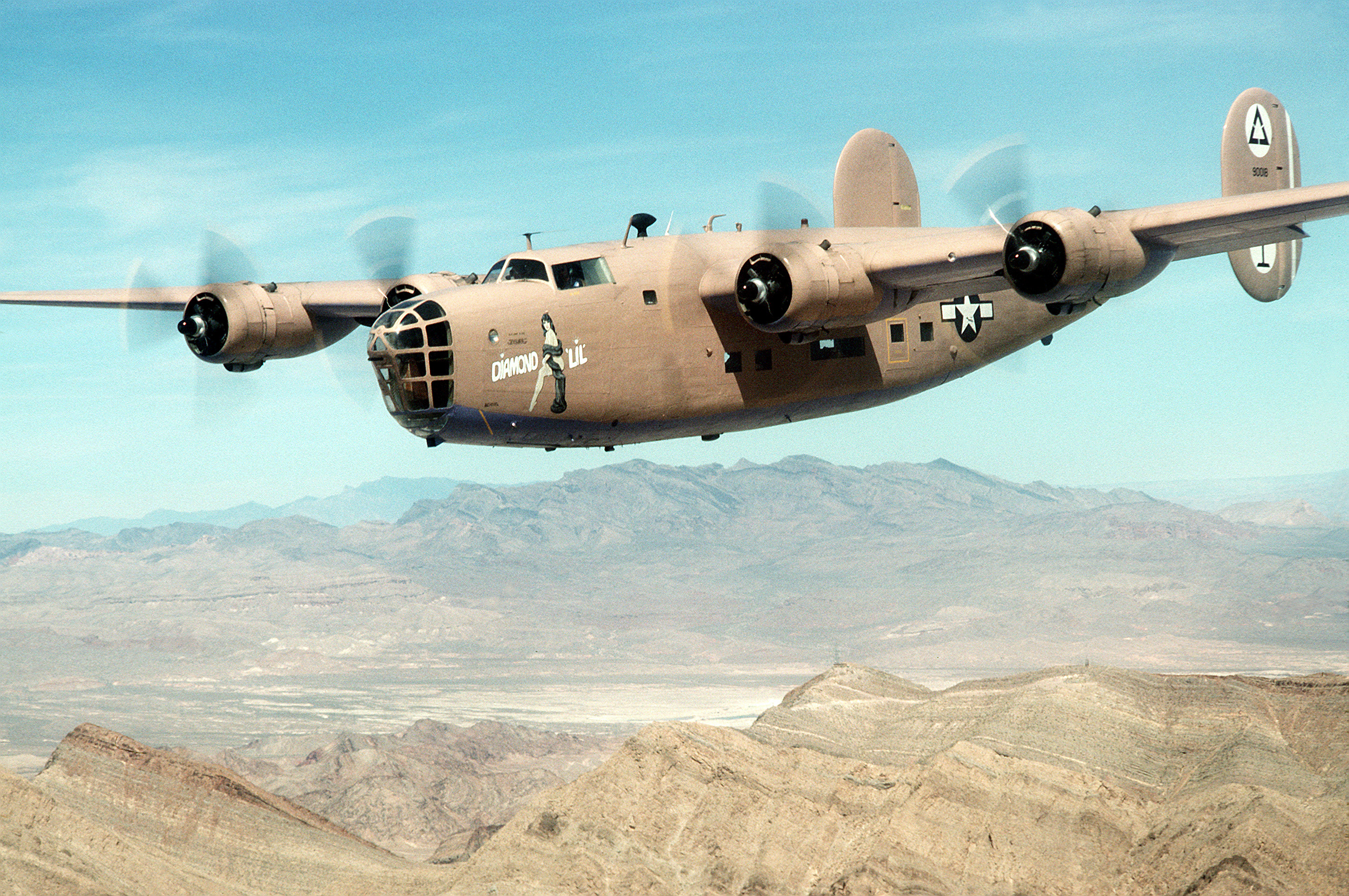
LB-30B Diamond Lil from the Commemorative Air Force. Airframe returned to B-24A configuration and renamed Ol' 927. She was renamed back to Diamond Lil in May 2012. (Note: Quote: "One of the primary reasons we decided to go with the 'A' model, vs the LB-30, was that this airplane was originally a B-24A.")

B-24A/LB-30B
Ordered in 1939, the B-24A was the first production model. Due to the need for long-range aircraft, the B-24A was ordered before any version of the B-24 flew. Aerodynamics improvements over the XB-24 led to better performance. Nine built as transports, transferred to Ferrying Command; while twenty were sold to the UK (before Lend-Lease) as LB-30Bs. (Total: 20 LB-30B; 9 B-24A)

Liberator B Mk II/LB-30
The first combat-ready B-24. The modifications included a three-foot nose extension, a deeper rear fuselage, wider tailplane, self-sealing fuel tanks, and armor. Built to British specifications with British equipment so there was no B-24 equivalent but it was similar to the B-24C. Except for the first aircraft which was completed as a pattern aircraft, and subsequently lost in a test flight, the rest of the run was completed without armament, which the British would fit after being flown to the UK. With the US entry into the war in December 1941, some 75 were requisitioned by the USAAF during delivery and retained the LB-30 designation in service. These were delivered unarmed. Browning M2 .50 in (13 mm) guns were fitted throughout; single guns were mounted in the nose, both waist positions, and the ventral tunnel; and a twin manual mount in the tail replaced the British 4 .303 in (7.70 mm) Browning tail turret, and a Martin turret with two guns replaced the Boulton Paul dorsal turret. Fifteen were sent to the south west Pacific, including some to Java to assist the Dutch East Indies, while three went to Alaska, six to Midway Island immediately after the naval battle in June. Six were lost in various accidents. Twenty-three were later returned to the UK in 1943. Seventeen were fitted with ASV radar and used in the Panama Canal Zone. (Total production: 165)

XB-24B
A newly funded conversion of the XB-24 after it failed to reach its projected top speed. The 1,000 hp (750 kW) Pratt & Whitney R-1830-33 radials were replaced with R-1830-41 turbo-supercharged radials rated at 1,200 hp (890 kW), increasing its top speed by 37 mph (60 km/h). The engine cowlings were made elliptical to accommodate the turbo-superchargers. The XB-24B also lacked the original's engine slots. It was re-serialed. (Total: 1 converted XB-24) XB-24B 39-680 was converted into a luxury airliner which included gutting the interior, cutting new windows, and dividing the interior into compartments with individual and bench seating and two-tier Pullman-style sleeping berths. Trim was added for sound-proofing, and a galley with refrigerator and hot plates.

B-24C
New production funded from deferred funds after LB-30A to the UK. Used the engine package tested in the XB-24B and the new fuselage of the LB-30. The tail air gunner position was improved by adding a hydraulically powered Consolidated A-6 turret with twin .50 in (12.7 mm) machine guns; a Martin powered dorsal turret was added to the forward fuselage. One (#84) converted to prototype the "three in nose" armament for the B-24D. FY funds and serial numbers transferred from B-24A. (Total: 9)

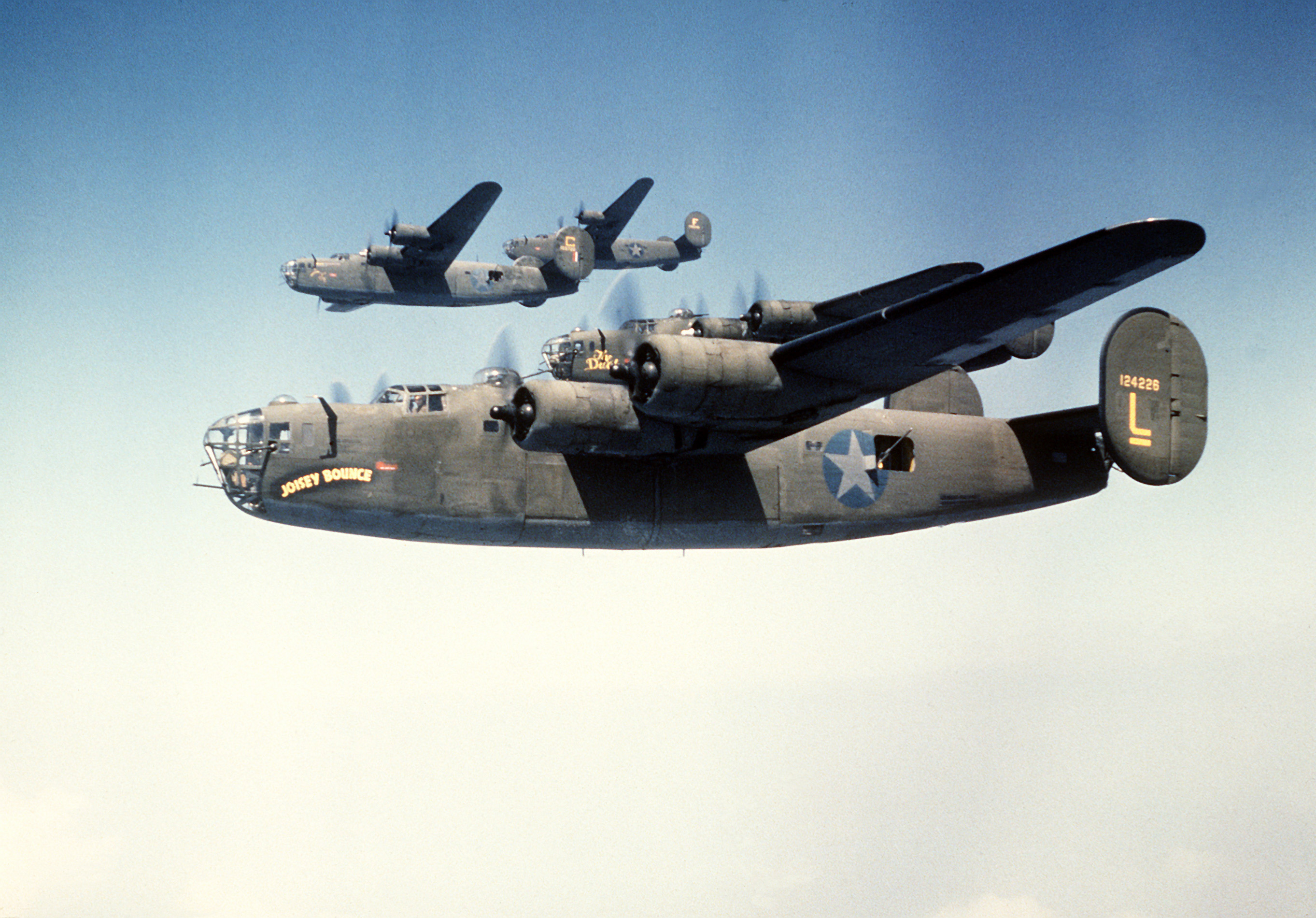
B-24Ds of 93rd Bomb Group in formation. Nearest aircraft is Joisey Bounce, almost hidden is wingman The Duchess, next higher is Boomerang with wingman Thunder Mug.

B-24D
First to see large scale production; ordered from 1940 to 1942, as a B-24C with more powerful R-1830-43 supercharged engines. The D model was initially equipped with a remotely operated and periscopically sighted Bendix belly turret, as the first examples of the B-17E Flying Fortress and some early models of the B-25 Mitchell medium bomber had used, but this was unsatisfactory and was discontinued after the 287th aircraft. Later aircraft reverted to the earlier manually operated "tunnel" mounting with a single .50 in (12.7 mm) machine gun. The tunnel gun was eventually replaced by the Sperry ball turret, which had also been adopted by the later B-17E Fortresses, but made retractable for the Liberator as the fuselage was very close to the ground. Late B-24Ds had "cheek" guns mounted on either side of the nose, just behind the "greenhouse". (Total: 2,696: 2,381 Consolidated, San Diego; 305 Consolidated, Fort Worth; 10 Douglas, Tulsa, Oklahoma).

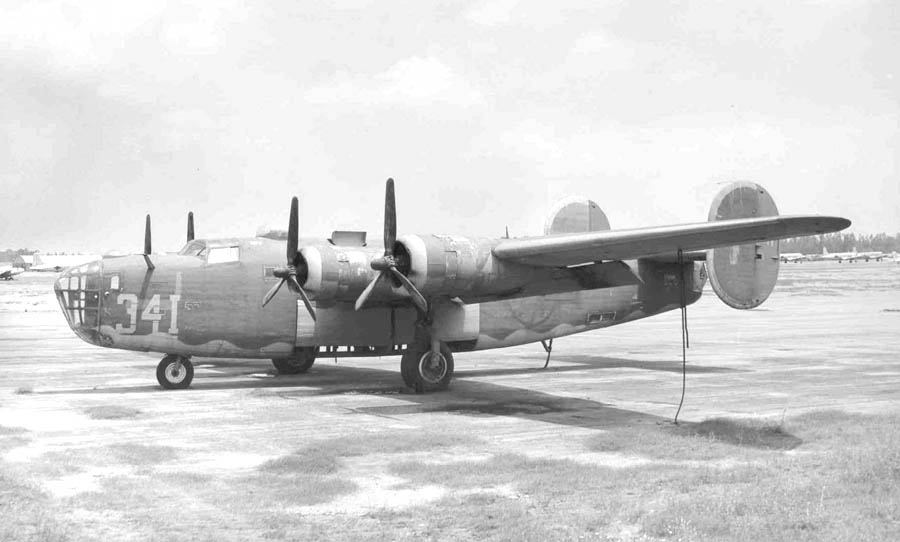
B-24E

B-24E
A slight alteration of the B-24D built by Ford, using R-1830-65 engines. The B-24E retained the belly tunnel gun. The USAAF used the B-24Es primarily as trainers as were the aircraft produced by Consolidated at San Diego (CO). Ford also built sub-assemblies for Douglas and Convair Fort Worth; these sub-assemblies were identical to Ford-built B-24Es, except that they used the same R-1830-43 radial engines as the B-24D. These sub-assemblies were called KD (knock down) kits and were trucked from Willow Run to the Southwest for the final assembly. (Total: 801)

XB-24F
A prototype made to test thermal de-icers to replace the standard inflatable rubber "boots". (Total: 1 converted B-24D)

B-24G
Designation for B-24D aircraft built by North American Aviation pursuant to a 1942 contract. Equipped with Sperry ball turret and three flexible .50 in (12.7 mm) machine guns in nose. (Total: 25)

B-24G-1
as B-24G but with A-6 nose turret. Most were operated by the 15th Air Force in Italy. (Total: 405)

B-24H
Because of the vulnerability of the B-24 to head-on attack with the earlier "greenhouse" nose, the B-24H design incorporated an electrically powered Emerson A-15 nose turret above the bombardier's position, similar to where the Frazer-Nash FN5 nose turret on the Avro Lancaster was placed. Approximately 50 other airframe changes were made, including a redesigned bombardier compartment. The tail turret was given larger windows for better visibility and the Martin A-3 dorsal turret received an enlarged "high hat" dome. The waist gunner positions were enclosed with Plexiglass windows, and laterally offset to reduce interference between the waist gunners. Most H model aircraft were built by Ford at Willow Run. (Total: 3,100)

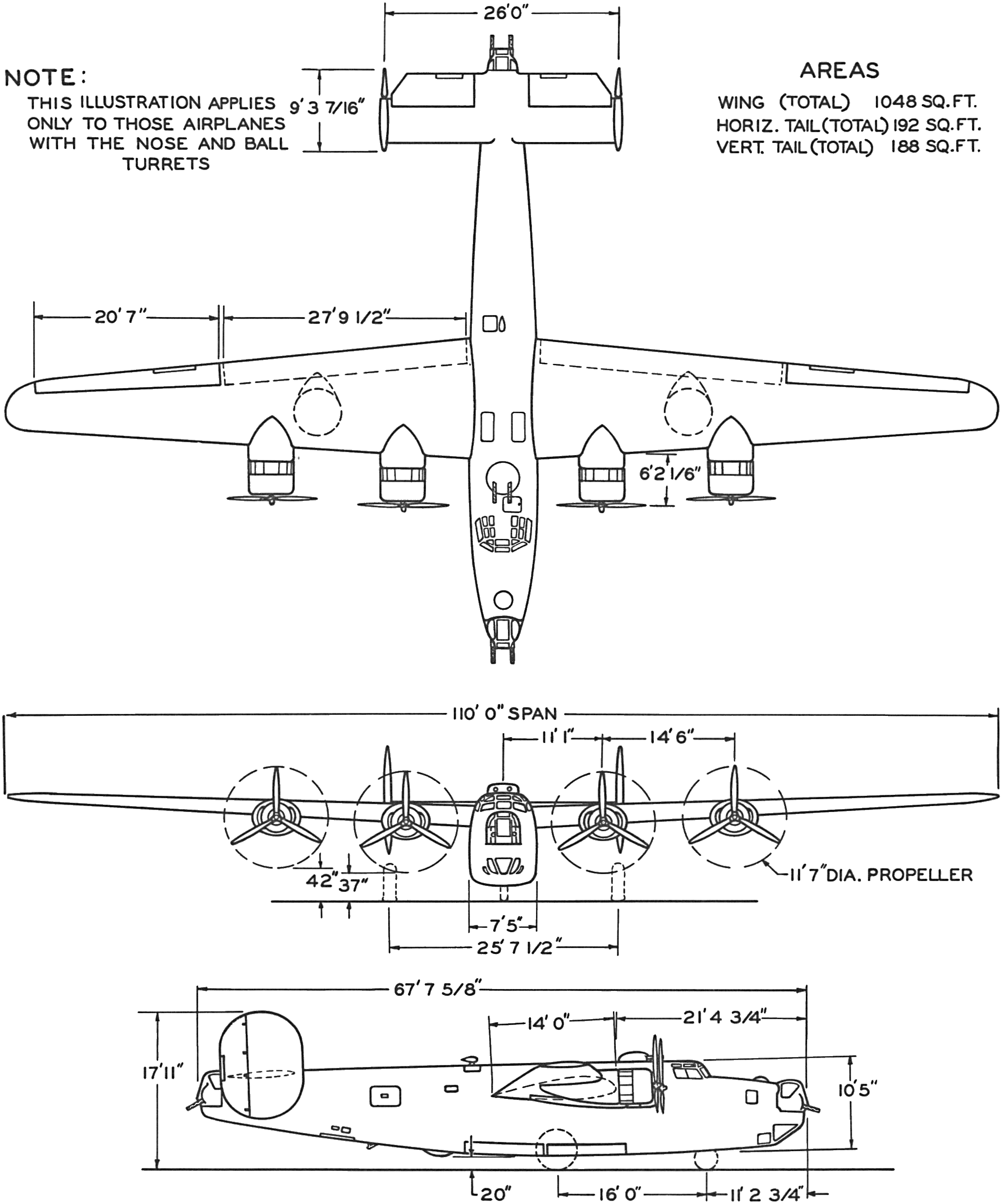
A 3-view line drawing of a B-24J

B-24J
The B-24J was similar to the B-24H, but shortages of the Emerson nose turret required use of a modified, hydraulically powered Consolidated A-6 turret in most J model aircraft built at Consolidated's San Diego and Fort Worth factories. The B-24J featured an improved autopilot (type C-1) and a M-1 series bombsight. B-24H sub-assemblies made by Ford and constructed by other companies and any model with a C-1 or M-1 retrofit, were all designated B-24J. The J model was the only version to be built by all five factories involved in B-24 production. (Total: 6,678)

XB-24K
Developed from the B-24ST, with a single fin and rudder replacing the twin tail on the standard Liberator. The improved performance and handling of the B-24ST and XB-24K led to the decision to incorporate a single tail in the PB4Y-2 and B-24N. (Total: 1 converted B-24D)

B-24L
Because of the excessive weight of the B-24J, the Army requested a lightened version. In the B-24L, the Sperry ball turret was replaced by a floor ring mount with two .50 in (12.7 mm) machine guns, and the A-6B tail turret by an M-6A. Later aircraft were delivered from the factory without tail guns. An A-6B or M-6A turret (190 total), a hand-held but hydraulically assisted twin .50 in (12.7 mm) mount (42) or a manually operated twin .50 in (12.7 mm) mounting was installed at a depot before delivery to operational units. The L model was built at Willow Run and Consolidated's San Diego factory. (Total: 1,667)

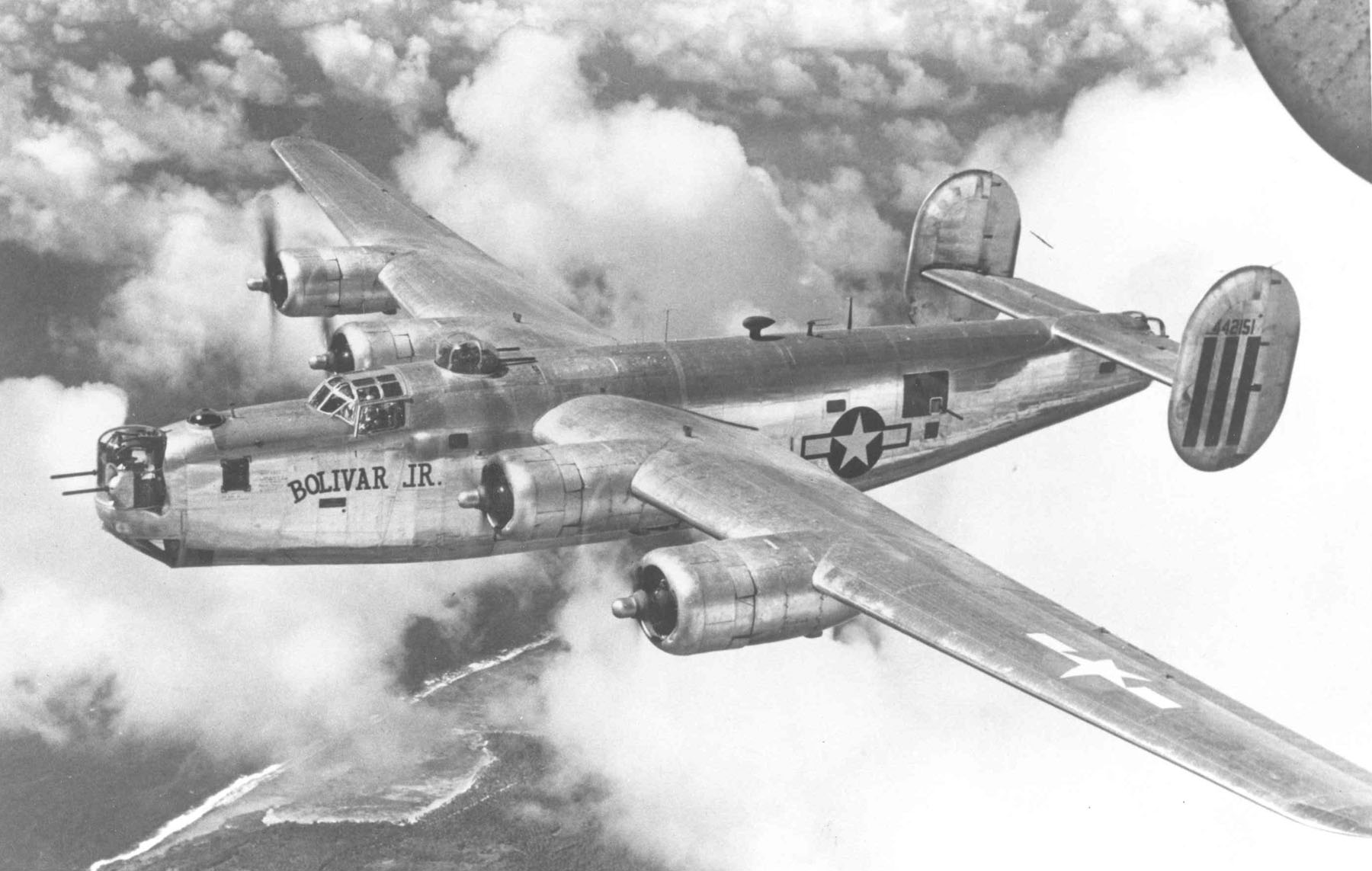
B-24M-20-CO Bolivar Jr. 431st Bomb Squadron, 11th Bomb Group

B-24M
Improved B-24L with further weight-savings. The B-24M used a lighter version of the A-6B tail turret; the waist gunner positions were left open, and the retractable Sperry ventral ball turret was reintroduced. For better visibility from the flight deck, the windshield in Ford-built aircraft was replaced by a version with less framing from Block 20 onward. The B-24M became the last production model of the B-24 and many flew only from the factory to the scrap yard. (Total: 2,593)

XB-24N
A redesign of the B-24J, made to accommodate a single tail. It also featured an Emerson 128 ball turret in the nose and a stationary tail gunner's position. While 5,168 B-24Ns were ordered, the end of the war resulted in cancellation of all contracts before production could begin. Its single tail was said to be the inspiration for the PB4Y-2 Privateer's similar single fin/rudder tail design. (Total: 1)

YB-24N
Pre-production service test version of the XB-24N. (Total: 7)

XB-24P
A modified B-24D, used by Sperry Gyroscope Company to test airborne fire control systems. (Total: 1 converted B-24D)

XB-24Q
A General Electric conversion of the B-24L. Used to test a radar-controlled tail turret intended for use in the Boeing B-47 Stratojet. (Total: o1 e converted B-24L)

XB-41
With no fighters capable of escorting bombers on deep strike missions early in World War II, the Army authorized heavily armed bombers as "gunship" escorts, which resulted in both the B-17 derived YB-40 Flying Fortress gunship and its Liberator-derived XB-41 counterpart. The XB-41 had fourteen .50 in (12.7 mm) machine guns, including a Bendix chin turret and a second Martin A-3 turret on the upper fuselage. One aircraft was completed in 1942. Performance was degraded drastically with the additional turrets and were unable to keep up with bomber formations, particularly when bombs had been dropped. Following testing in 1943 the project was canceled. (Total: 1 converted B-24D)

B-24ST
An experimental aircraft, The B-24ST (for Single Tail, an unofficial designation applied by Ford) was made by Ford by fitting a single fin and rudder onto a B-24D airframe. The aircraft was more stable and had better handling than other models and was used as the basis of the XB-24K.

AT-22 or TB-24
C-87 used for flight engineer training.
- RB-24L: Developed for training B-29 gunners on an identical remote gun system installed on a B-24L.
- TB-24L: As with the RB-24L, but with additional radar equipment.

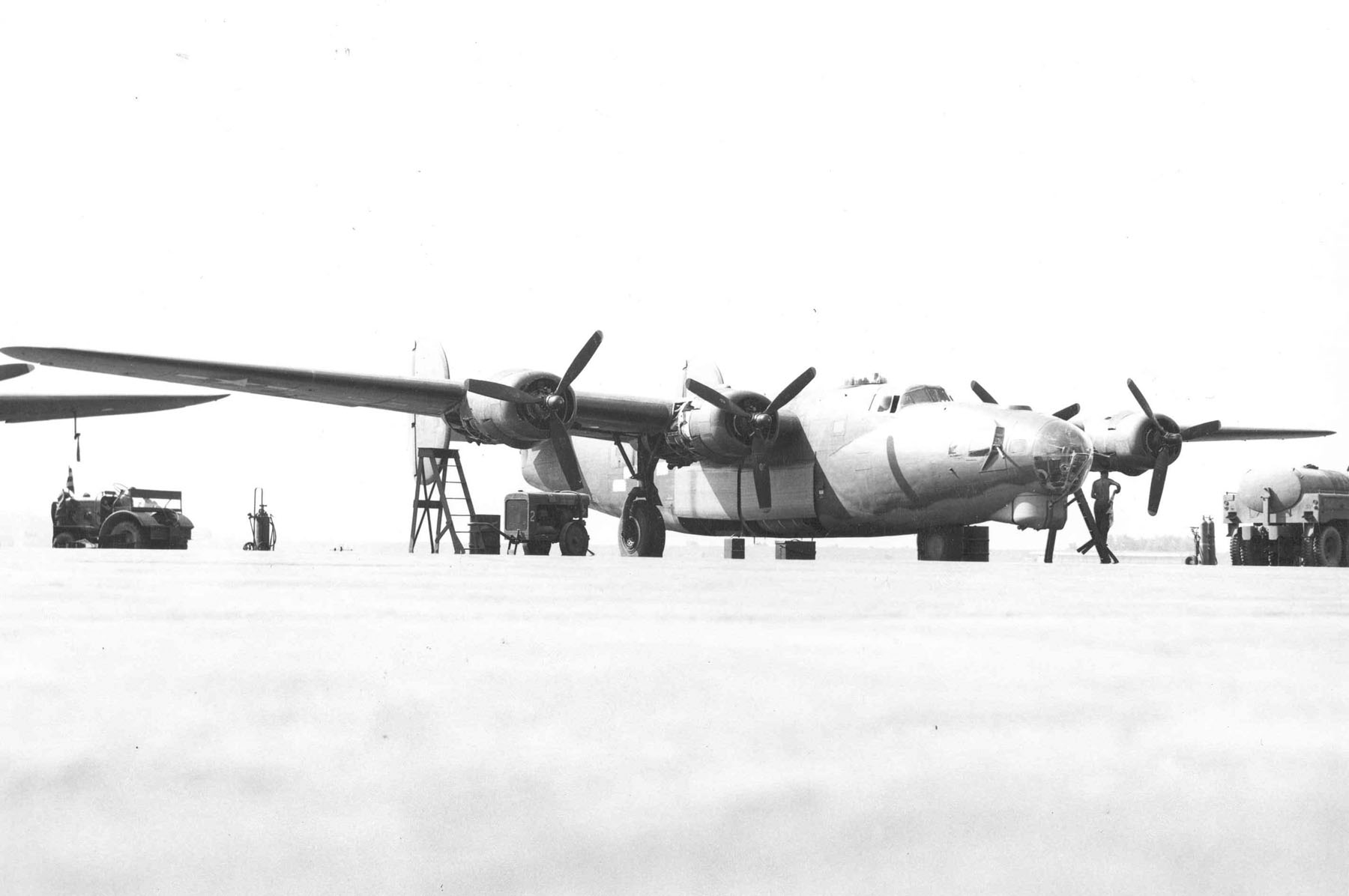
Experimental B-24J-15-CO with B-17G nose grafted on, with a chin turret, a modification not adopted for production

C-87 Liberator Express
Transports with accommodation for 20 passengers.
- C-87A: VIP transports with R-1830-45 instead of -43 engines and sleeping berths for 16 passengers.
- C-87B: Projected armed transport with nose guns, dorsal turret, and ventral tunnel gun; not produced.
- C-87C: US Army Air Force/Air Force designation for the RY-3.

XC-109/C-109
Tankers used to ferry fuel from India to China to support early B-29 raids against Japan.

XF-7
Photographic reconnaissance variant developed from the B-24D.

F-7
Photographic reconnaissance variant developed from the B-24H; -FO block.

F-7A
Photographic reconnaissance variant developed from the B-24J; three cameras in the nose and three in the bomb bay.

F-7B
Photographic reconnaissance variant developed from the B-24J; six cameras in the bomb bay.

BQ-8
A number of worn-out B-24D and B-24Js were converted as radio-controlled flying bombs to attack German targets. Joseph P. Kennedy Jr. was killed in a BQ-8 during Operation Anvil.

=== US Navy nomenclature and sub-variants ===
PB4Y-1
US Navy designation applied to 976 navalized B-24D, J, L and M models built at Consolidated's San Diego factory, as well as one North American-built B-24G. Later aircraft were equipped with an ERCO nose turret.
PB4Y-1P
Photographic reconnaissance variant developed from the PB4Y-1.
PB4Y-2 Privateer
A developed PB4Y with a large single fin, a lengthened fuselage and many other improvements and changes.
P5Y
Proposed twin-engined patrol version of PB4Y-1. Unbuilt.
RY-1
US Navy designation for the C-87A.
RY-2
US Navy designation for the C-87.
RY-3
Transport variant of the PB4Y-2.
R2Y
Liberator Liner built using a new fuselage for the US Navy as an airliner with 48 seats

=== British Commonwealth nomenclature and sub-variants ===
Color photograph of an RAF C.Mk.I

Liberator C Mk.I
YB-24/LB-30A RAF direct purchase aircraft. (Total: 9) Unsuitable for combat, rebuilt as transports and used by BOAC between the UK and Canada, including transferring aircrew ferrying Lend-Lease aircraft.
Liberator B Mk.I
B-24A/LB-30B, RAF direct purchase aircraft. (Total: 20) Unsuitable for combat, some rebuilt for other roles.
Liberator GR Mk.I
Mk.I rebuilt as General Reconnaissance for anti-submarine patrol. Fitted with belly pannier with an additional four fixed forward firing 20 mm (0.787 in) Hispano cannon and ASV radar which included two underwing Yagi–Uda antennas and four large antenna "stickleback" masts above the rear fuselage.

Liberator B Mk.II
LB-30. First combat-ready Liberator. Modifications included a three-foot nose extension as well as a deeper aft fuselage and wider tailplane and self-sealing fuel tanks and armor. Built to British specifications with British equipment and Boulton Paul turrets, so there was no B-24 equivalent but similar to the B-24C. The top turret was further back on the fuselage compared to any US variant, and in line with the trailing edge of the wing. Except for the first aircraft (completed as a pattern but lost in a test flight), the rest were completed without armament, which the British fitted in the UK. With the American entry into the war, the USAAF requisitioned about 75, which it operated under Consolidated's LB-30 designation, but 23 were returned in 1943. (Total production: 165)
Liberator C Mk.II
Mk.II transport. Some B Mk.IIs were rebuilt as transports, including one as the personal transport of British Prime Minister Winston Churchill, which was named 'Commando', which was later extensively rebuilt to C Mk.IX standard, with a single fin.

Liberator B Mk.III
B-24D with one nose .303 in (7.70 mm) Browning machine gun, two in each waist position, and four in a Boulton Paul tail turret similar to that used on the Handley Page Halifax. The Martin dorsal turret was retained. (Total: 156)
- Liberator B Mk IIIA: Mk.III with American equipment and weapons.
Liberator GR Mk.III
Mk.III General Reconnaissance for RAF Coastal Command for anti-submarine role with radar (with Yagi–Uda antenna) and Leigh Light.
- Liberator GR Mk IIIA: GR.III with American equipment and weapons.

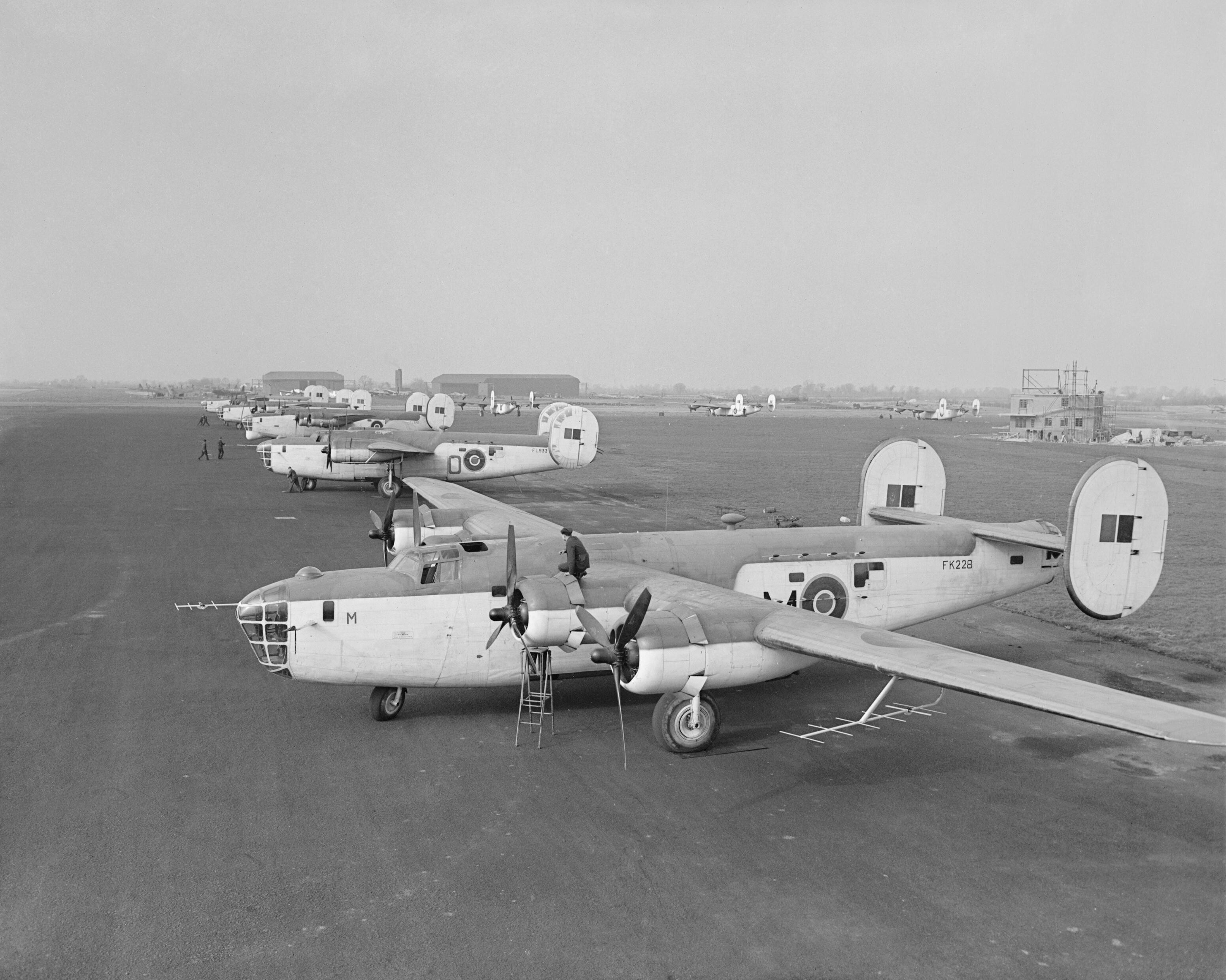
RAF Coastal Command ASV Mk.II-equipped Liberator GR.III of No. 120 Squadron RAF

Liberator B Mk.IV
Unused designation reserved for B-24E.

Liberator B Mk.V
B-24D bomber with more fuel but less armor, armed as per Mk.III.
Liberator GR Mk.V
General Reconnaissance Mk.V for RAF Coastal Command for anti-submarine role with radar (some mounted under the nose) and Leigh Light. Some fitted with eight zero-length rocket launchers, four on each wing, with others being fitted with stub-wings either side of the lower forward fuselage to hold eight RP-3 rails.

Liberator B Mk.VI
B-24H bomber with nose turret, and Boulton Paul tail turret and retaining the rest of their armament.
Liberator GR Mk.VI
B-24G/H/J RAF Coastal Command anti-submarine patrol. Some had top turret removed in service, and early examples had Yagi–Uda antenna on older greenhouse nose.
Liberator C Mk.VI/C Mk.VIT
Mk.VI converted as a cargo aircraft.

Liberator C Mk.VII
RAF C-87 transport.

Liberator B Mk.VIII
RAF B-24J bomber.
Liberator GR Mk.VIII
Mk.VIII for RAF Coastal Command anti-submarine patrol. Some had top turret removed in service, and belly turret replaced with semi-recessed radar dome.
Liberator C Mk.VIII
Mk.VIII converted as a cargo aircraft.

Liberator C Mk.IX
RAF RY-3/C-87C transport with a single fin replacing the twin fins on most Liberator versions.

Late in the war RAF Liberator aircraft modified in England for use in South East Asia had the suffix "Snake" stenciled below the serial number to give them priority delivery through the Mediterranean and the Middle East.

== Operators ==
- Australia
- Canada
- Republic of China
- China
- Czechoslovakia
- Germany
- India
- Italy
- Nicaragua
- Netherlands
- New Zealand
- Poland
- Portugal
- Romania
- Soviet Union
- South Africa
- Turkey
- United Kingdom
- United States

== Specifications (B-24J) ==
3-view line drawing of the Consolidated B-24 Liberator

Data from Quest for Performance, Jane's Fighting aircraft of World War II, General Dynamics aircraft and their predecessors

General characteristics

- Crew: 11 (pilot, co-pilot, navigator, bombardier, radio operator, nose turret, top turret, 2 waist gunners, ball turret, tail gunner)
- Length: 67 ft 2 in (20.47 m)
- Wingspan: 110 ft (34 m)
- Height: 17 ft 7.5 in (5.372 m)
- Wing area: 1,048 sq ft (97.4 m^{2})
- Aspect ratio: 11.55
- Airfoil: root: Davis (22%); tip: Davis (9.3%)
- Empty weight: 36,500 lb (16,556 kg)
- Gross weight: 55,000 lb (24,948 kg)
- Max takeoff weight: 65,000 lb (29,484 kg) plus
- Fuel capacity: 2,344 US gal (1,952 imp gal; 8,870 L) normal capacity; 3,614 US gal (3,009 imp gal; 13,680 L) with long-range tanks in the bomb bay; Oil capacity 131.6 US gal (109.6 imp gal; 498 L) in four self-sealing nacelle hopper tanks
- Powerplant: 4 × Pratt & Whitney R-1830-35 Twin Wasp, R-1830-41 or R-1830-65 14-cylinder two-row air-cooled turbo-supercharged radial piston engines, 1,200 hp (890 kW) each
- Propellers: 3-bladed Hamilton Standard, 11 ft 7 in (3.53 m) diameter constant-speed fully-feathering propellers

Performance

- Maximum speed: 297 mph (478 km/h, 258 kn) at 25,000 ft (7,600 m)
- Cruise speed: 215 mph (346 km/h, 187 kn)
- Stall speed: 95 mph (153 km/h, 83 kn)
- Range: 1,540 mi (2,480 km, 1,340 nmi) at 237 mph (206 kn; 381 km/h) and 25,000 ft (7,600 m) with normal fuel and maximum internal bomb load
- Ferry range: 3,700 mi (6,000 km, 3,200 nmi)
- Service ceiling: 28,000 ft (8,500 m)
- Rate of climb: 1,025 ft/min (5.21 m/s)
- Time to altitude: 20,000 ft (6,100 m) in 25 minutes
- Lift-to-drag: 12.9
- Wing loading: 52.5 lb/sq ft (256 kg/m^{2})
- Power/mass: 0.0873 hp/lb (0.1435 kW/kg)

Armament

- Guns: 10 × .50 caliber (12.7 mm) M2 Browning machine guns in 4 turrets and two waist positions
- Bombs:
  - Short range (400 mi [640 km]): 8,000 pounds (3,600 kg)
  - Long range (800 mi [1,300 km]): 5,000 pounds (2,300 kg)
  - Very long range (1,200 mi [1,900 km]): 2,700 pounds (1,200 kg)

== Notable B-24 crewmen ==
- Robert Altman, film director, was a B-24 co-pilot, flying over 50 bombing missions in Borneo and the Dutch East Indies.
- William Charles Anderson, author of BAT-21 and Bomber Crew 369, piloted Liberators based in Italy as a member of the 451st Bomb Group of the 15th AF.
- Chuck Bednarik, NFL Hall of Fame member, former Philadelphia Eagle and the last full-time two-way player, served as a B-24 waist-gunner with the Eighth Air Force 467th Bomb Group. Bednarik participated in 30 combat missions over Germany as a S/Sgt and eventually attained the rank of First Lieutenant. Bednarik was awarded the Air Medal and four Oak Leaf Clusters, the European-African-Middle Eastern Campaign Medal and four Battle Stars.
- Hal Clement, science fiction author, was a pilot and copilot on B-24s and flew 35 combat missions over Europe with the 68th Bomb Squadron, 44th Bomb Group, based in England with Eighth Air Force.
- Sonny Eliot (Marvin Schlossberg), Detroit TV and radio meteorologist and comedian, piloted B-24s over Germany before being captured and spending 18 months as a prisoner of war.
- John Standish Fforde, British Economist and Chief Cashier of the Bank of England from 1966 - 1970, whose signature appeared on British banknotes during that time. His RAF war service saw him instruct for the British Commonwealth Air Training Plan and in 1943 converted on to Liberators and was posted to No. 358 Squadron RAF for the South East Asia Command based out of Jessore. He captained 24 missions dropping supplies into Burma.
- Ernest K. Gann, early airline pilot and author, flew C-87 Cargo Express aircraft in Southern Asia and China, including flying cargo over "The Hump". He detailed his flying experiences in Fate is the Hunter.
- Don Herbert, television pioneer "Mr. Wizard", flew 56 missions as a Liberator pilot over northern Italy, Germany, and Yugoslavia, winning the Distinguished Flying Cross.
- Joseph P. Kennedy Jr., elder brother of future US President John F. Kennedy, was killed in Operation Anvil when his PB4Y-1 Liberator, modified to be a remote-controlled bomb, exploded in flight.
- Ben Kuroki, top turret gunner, was the only Japanese-American in the United States Army Air Forces to serve in combat operations in the Pacific theater of World War II.
- Walter Matthau, actor, was a radioman and nose gunner in the 453rd Bomb Group
- George McGovern, US Senator and 1972 presidential candidate, served as a B-24 pilot on his plane, Dakota Queen, in missions over Germany from Cerignola, Italy, as a member of the 455th Bomb Group of the Fifteenth Air Force. His wartime exploits and some of the characteristics of the B-24 are the focus of Stephen Ambrose's book The Wild Blue.
- Actor Jimmy Stewart flew B-24s as commanding officer of the 703rd Bomber Squadron, 445th Bombardment Group, out of RAF Tibenham, UK. (He was later promoted to operations officer of the 453rd BG.) From 1943 to 1944, Stewart was credited with 20 combat missions as a pilot, including one over Berlin. Stewart flew several (possibly as many as 20) additional uncredited missions, filling in for pilots as duties and space would allow. Stewart's leadership qualities were highly regarded; the men who served under him praised his coolness under fire. He entered service as a private in early 1941 and rose to the rank of colonel by 1945.
- Flying Officer Lloyd Trigg VC (1914–1943), New Zealand pilot in the RNZAF, died during a successful attack on a German U-boat off West Africa. His medal was uniquely awarded solely on the recommendation of the enemy captain and other eyewitnesses.
- Stewart Udall, author, conservationist, US Representative, and Secretary of Interior, served as a waist gunner on a B-24 in 1944. He was based in Southern Italy; 15th Army AF, 454th Bombardment Group. His Liberator's nickname was "Flyin' Home". He is credited with 50 missions. The 454th received a Unit Citation for leading an attack on the Hermann Goering Steel Works in Linz, Austria on 25 July 1944. Udall's crew suffered one casualty on the mission. The dead crew member was serving at the waist-gunner position normally manned by Udall; by chance, the pilot assigned Udall to the nose gun for this mission, saving his life.
- Jim Wright, former Speaker of the House, served as a B-24 bombardier in the Pacific. He recounted his experience in his book The Flying Circus: Pacific War – 1943 – as Seen Through a Bombsight.
- Louis Zamperini, Olympic runner, and later war prisoner and hero, served as a bombardier on two B-24s. The first, "Super Man", was damaged, and the crew was assigned to B-24D "Green Hornet" to conduct search and rescue. On 27 May 1943, the aircraft crashed into the Pacific Ocean. Eight of the 11 crewmembers were killed. Zamperini, pilot Russell A. Phillips, and Francis McNamara survived the crash. Only Zamperini and Phillips survived their 47 days adrift on a life raft on the sea. Zamperini is the subject of two biographies and the 2014 film Unbroken.

== Notable appearances in media ==
- The book One Damned Island After Another (1946) contains the official history of the 7th Bomber Command of the Seventh Air Force. It describes B-24 operations in the Central Pacific. B-24s from the Seventh Air Force were the first B-24s to bomb the Japanese home islands.
- Authors Cassius Mullen and Betty Byron wrote the story of the first American heavy bomber crew to complete a 25-mission combat tour in the European Theater during World War II. The book Before the Belle (2015) tells the story of Capt Robert Shannon and his aircraft, which completed a combat tour only to be lost in an accident while transporting Lt Gen Frank Maxwell Andrews back to Washington on 3 May 1943.
- Laura Hillenbrand's Unbroken: A World War II Story of Survival, Resilience, and Redemption (2010) tells the story of B-24D bombardier Louis Zamperini and how he survived crashing in the Pacific, being adrift on the ocean for 47 days, and then more than two years in Japanese POW camps.
- Damnyankee: A WWII Story of Tragedy and Survival off the West of Ireland by Thomas L. Walsh (2009) tells the story of a US Navy PB4Y-1 (B-24 Liberator) submarine patrol bomber that ditched off the west coast of Ireland in 1944; five of the ten crew survived 33 hours adrift in a seething North Atlantic storm before drifting ashore in Clifden, County Galway, Ireland.
- The Sinking of the Laconia depicts the Laconia Incident and a B-24's attempts to sink the German submarine U-156.
- Shady Lady: Mission Accomplished, Running on Empty (2012) tells the true story of the USAAF's B-24D Shady Lady,. It was one of 11 planes that took off from Darwin, Australia, on Friday, 13 August 1943, to bomb a Japanese oil refinery at Balikpapan, Borneo, a distance of more than 1,300 miles. This mission was the longest overwater bombing mission up to that time.

== See also ==
- 1943 Gibraltar B-24 crash
- H2X
- Lady Be Good (aircraft)
- Little Eva (aircraft)
- Operation Aphrodite
- Willow Run Airport

Related development

- Consolidated B-32 Dominator
- Consolidated C-87 Liberator Express
- Consolidated Liberator I
- Consolidated R2Y
- Consolidated XB-41 Liberator
- PB4Y Privateer

Aircraft of comparable role, configuration, and era

- Avro Lancaster
- Boeing B-17 Flying Fortress
- Focke-Wulf Fw 200 Condor
- Handley Page Halifax
- Heinkel He 177
- Junkers Ju 290
- Petlyakov Pe-8
- Piaggio P.108
- Short Stirling
