= Consolidated Liberator I =

American-built heavy bomber

Liberator I
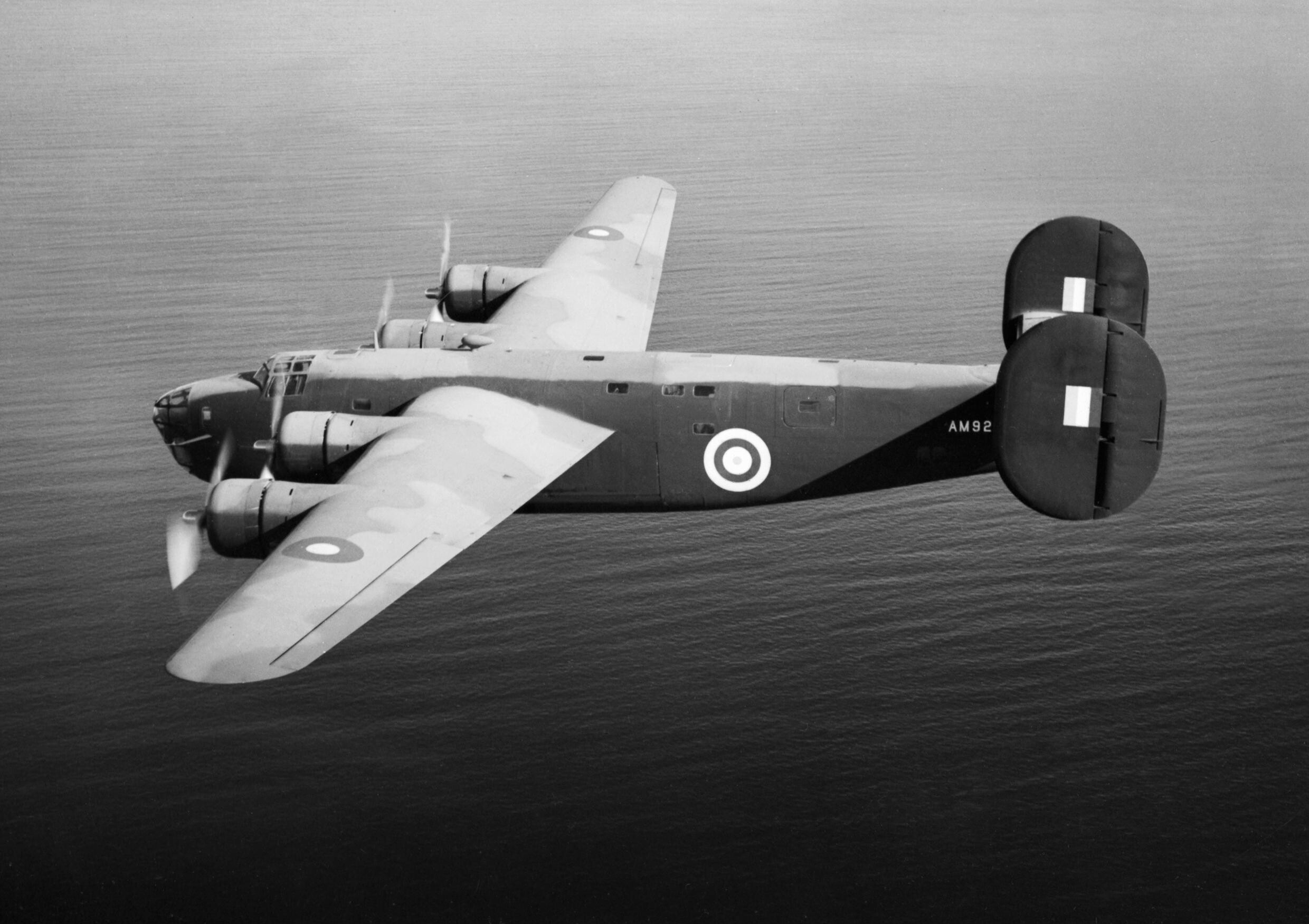
- Liberator Mk.I AM922 during a ferry flight over the Atlantic

General information
- Type: Anti-submarine warfare
- Manufacturer: Consolidated Aircraft Corporation
- Designer: Isaac M. Laddon
- Status: Retired
- Primary user: RAF
- Number built: 20

History
- Introduction date: 1941
- First flight: 1941
- Retired: 1946, UK; 1947, BOAC
- Developed from: Consolidated B-24 Liberator

Consolidated Liberator I was the service name of the first Consolidated B-24 Liberator four-engined bombers to see use with the Royal Air Force (RAF).

A small number of B-24s were purchased for the RAF but assessment showed that they were not suitable for use over Europe. They were however suitable for long range maritime reconnaissance and were put into use with RAF Coastal Command.

== Service history ==
In August 1939, before the prototype had been completed, the United States Army Air Corps (USAAC) ordered 38 examples of the Consolidated B-24A (the first production variant). From this order, 20 aircraft (originally allocated serial numbers 40-2349 to 40-2368) were released for direct purchase by the RAF where it was given the service name Liberator B.Mk.I (from "Bomber Mark 1").

The twenty Liberator B.Mk.I were delivered to the RAF starting in mid 1941 and were given serial numbers AM910 to AM929. After a period of testing at the Aeroplane and Armament Experimental Establishment (A&AEE) at RAF Boscombe Down, England, it was found to be unsuitable for combat over Europe. (Note: The Boeing B-17 Flying Fortress was also found to be lacking when first used by RAF) Among the deficiencies cited were the lack of self-sealing fuel tanks, poor defensive armament and general lack of combat readiness. (Note: AM927 was retained in the USA for training RAF pilots by TWA but suffered an accident and was rebuilt as a transport and used by Consolidated as company aircraft "on loan" from RAF during the war. It is one of the surviving Liberators)

The long range and heavy bomb load however, made the Liberator a natural choice for RAF Coastal Command (CC) for use in long-range maritime patrols against the U-boat menace. Twelve aircraft were sent to Scottish Aviation in Prestwick, Scotland for extensive conversion to meet the anti-submarine warfare role and they were redesignated Liberator GR.Mk.I – the 'GR' standing for 'General Reconnaissance'. The conversion included the addition of air-to-surface-vessel (ASV) radar and a pack of four forward firing 20 mm Hispano cannon under the forward bomb bay. Some aircraft were further modified with a pair of stub wings on the fuselage under each wing which carried eight RP-3 ("60 pound") rockets along with the installation of a Leigh light (search light) under the right wing.

The entire series of Liberator GR.Mk.Is were assigned to 15 Group in Coastal Command with the reforming of No. 120 Squadron RAF in June 1941 and continued in service until December 1943. During this time, they accounted for five U-boats confirmed sunk and four damaged.

With the end of the war, the Liberators in Coastal Command were replaced by the arguably inferior maritime patrol variant of the Avro Lancaster, the GR Mk 3.

== Aircraft ==
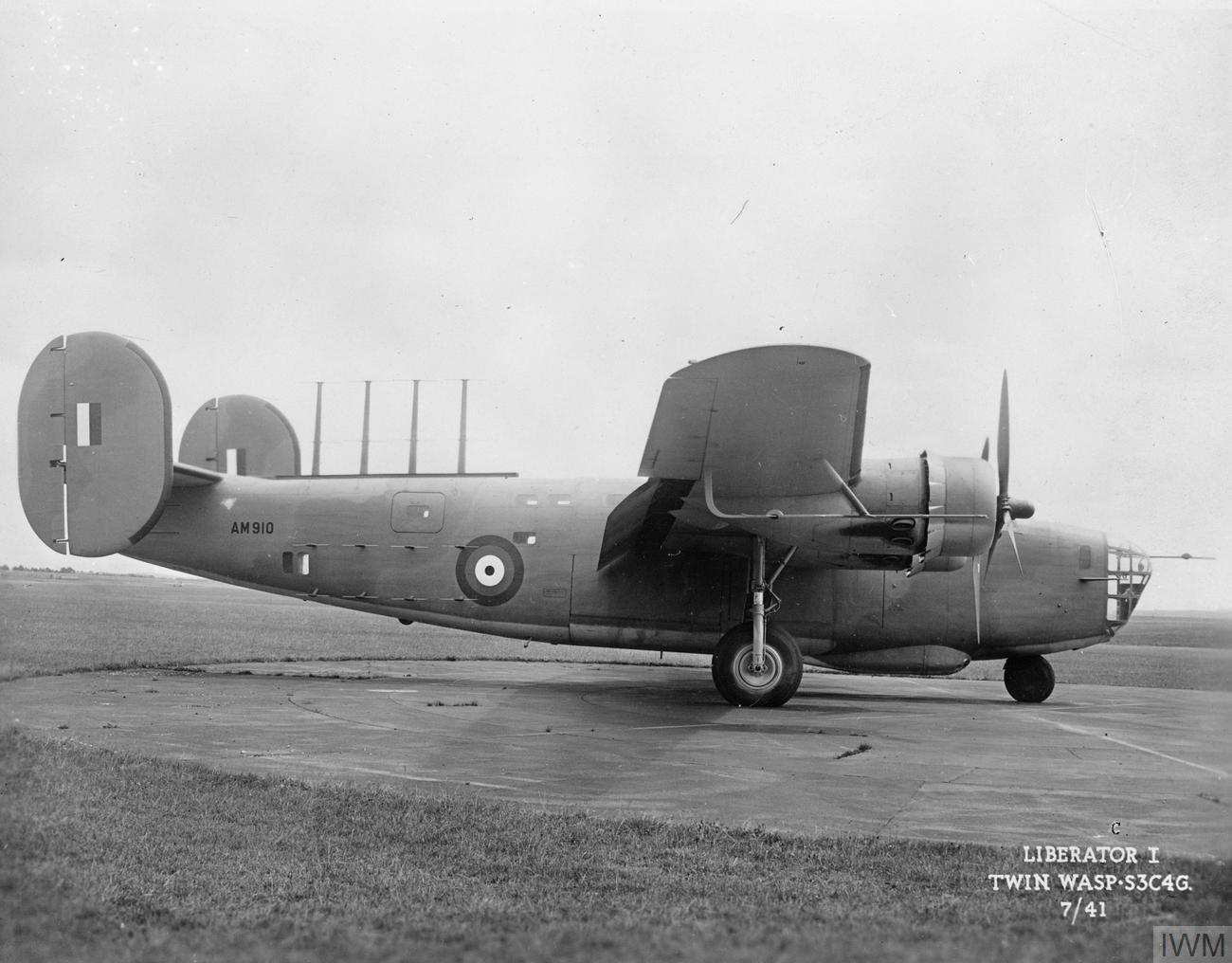
Liberator Mk. 1 AM910. The antenna for its ASV radar are fitted to the top of the fuselage. The forward half of the bomb-bay is sealed up and a blister, containing four 20mm cannon, is fitted underneath it (July 1941)

All the aircraft were delivered from March to May 1941, AM911, AM914 and AM922 were "Unmodified crew trainer". Three Liberators were initially converted to Liberator C.Mk.I (for "cargo") freighters: (AM915, AM918, AM920) and used on the Transatlantic for returning aircraft ferry pilots to Canada as well as priority shipments to the UK. When the Liberator GR.Is were retired from No. 120 Squadron, being replaced with later marks, the remaining aircraft were converted to Liberator C.Is.

- AM910 was used to assess the Liberator B.Mk.I for the RAF in July/August 1941 at the A&AEE. It was then used for testing the Liberator GR.Mk.I AXV radar and 20 mm cannon installations and converted to Liberator GR.Mk.I being assigned to 120 Squadron on 5 September 1941. In April 1942, it crashed on landing at RAF Nutts Corner.
- AM911 was converted to Liberator GR.Mk.I and assigned to 120 Squadron on 19 June 1941 unmodified for use as a pilot/crew instructional trainer. In October 1941, it was returned to Scottish Aviation for transport modifications to carry passengers and mail only. On 23 May 1943 the undercarriage collapsed at RAF Gibraltar and it was written off.
- AM912 was damaged on landing on 16 May 1941 and not repaired, while attached to the Aeroplane and Armament Experimental Establishment.
- AM913 After a period of time at an Operational Training Unit, it was converted to Liberator GR.Mk.I standard and assigned to 120 Squadron. On 29 January 1943 it crashed due to the loss of two engines (number 3 and 4) on approach to RAF Talbenny at the end of a flight from Africa. Among the 11 killed was Brigadier Vivian Dykes.
- AM914 was used at an Operational Training Unit before conversion to a Liberator GR.Mk.I and assigned to 120 Squadron assigned as pilot/crew instructional trainer. In October 1941, it was returned to Scottish Aviation for transport modifications – passengers and mail only – no cargo door installed and redesignated Liberator C.Mk.I. In June 1942 it was reassigned to 1425 Flt. After the war it was SOC (Struck Off Charge) Canada.
- AM915 was converted to Liberator C.Mk.I and assigned to the RAF Ferry Command. On 1 September 1941, it flew into Achinoan Hill near Campbeltown, Argyll, Scotland, killing ten crew and passengers.
- AM916 (ex 40-2355) manufacturer s/n 7 was converted to Liberator GR.Mk.I and assigned to 120 Squadron. On 5 April 1942, during Operation Myrmidon, it was engaged in combat with three Junkers Ju 88s for over half an hour. From June – July 1942, it was detached to Middle East (with 120/P AM919). After the war it was sold.
- AM917 (ex 40-2356) s/n 8 was converted to Liberator GR.Mk.I and assigned to 120 Squadron. On 16 August 42, attacked and damaged U-89 and on 19 August 1942 it attacked and damaged U-653 while escorting convoy SL 118. U-653 was seriously damaged and had to limp back to base, reaching Brest, France on 30 August 1942. AM917 attacked but did not damage U-386 southwest of Iceland. After the war it was Struck Off Charge in March 1947
- AM918 (ex 40-2357) s/n 9 was converted to Liberator C.Mk.I and assigned to the RAF Ferry Command. Assigned to BOAC with registration G-AGDR. May 1941 delivered to England by Ferry Command (Pilot: W/C John Francis). Between 24–25 January 1942, AM918 with civil registry G-AGDR flew nonstop from Hurn to Cairo. However, on its return trip, it was shot down in error by a Spitfire over the English Channel near Plymouth on 15 February 1943 with nine killed.
- AM919 (ex 40-2358) s/n 10 was converted to Liberator GR.Mk.I and assigned to 120 Squadron.
  - June – July 1942, detached to Middle East (with 120/L AM916). While escorting convoy SC 130 in the North Atlantic on 20 May 1943, attacked and sank U-258 with depth charges. On 18 June 1943, undercarriage collapsed on landing at Reykjavík, Iceland and the aircraft was salvaged for spares.
- AM920 (ex 40-2359) s/n 11 was converted to Liberator C.Mk.I and assigned to the RAF Ferry Command. Assigned to BOAC with registration G-AHYB. On 10 February 1946 it completed the British Overseas Airways Corporation's 2,000th transatlantic crossing It passed to France as F-VNNP and became the personal transport of Indochina's Emperor Bảo Đại.
- AM921 (ex 40-2360) s/n 12 was converted to Liberator GR.Mk.I and assigned to 120 Squadron.
  - 8 December 1941, attacked and sank U-254 in the North Atlantic south-east of Cape Farewell, Greenland, in approximate position 55° 00'N, 40° 00'W (U-boat Captain Hans Gilardone).
  - 16 October 1942, attacked U-258 while escorting convoy SC 104.
  - 8 December 1942, attacked and sank U-611 in the North Atlantic south-east of Cape Farewell, while on convoy escort HX 217.
  - 9 January 1943, engine caught fire in air and crashed on landing at Reykjavík, Iceland.
- AM922 (ex 40-2361) s/n 13 was converted to Liberator GR.Mk.I and assigned to 15 Group (CC)/120 Squadron as an unmodified pilot/crew instructional trainer.
  - October 1941, returned to Scottish Aviation for transport modifications – passengers and mail only – no cargo door installed and redesignated Liberator C.Mk.I.
  - 7 January 1942, reassigned to No 1425 (Transport) Flight – Absorbed by RAF 511 Sq (transport) when Flight was created.
  - 7 September 1944, placed in storage.
  - June 1947, salvaged.
- AM923 (ex 40-2362) s/n 14 was converted to Liberator GR.Mk.I and assigned to 15 Group (CC)/120 Squadron with Squadron Code: OH aircraft W.
  - 27 May 1941, searched for the battleship Bismarck during delivery flight (Pilot Capt White).
  - December 1943, salvaged.
- AM924 (ex 40-2363) s/n 15 was converted to Liberator GR.Mk.I and assigned to 15 Group (CC)/120 Squadron with Squadron Code: OH aircraft D "Donald Duck."
  - October 1941 attacked Fw 200 Condor
  - 5 April 1942, attacked and fuel tank damaged by an Arado float plane while escorting Convoy Skipper near 43° 36'N, 02° 07'W (Pilot: P/O Secord).
  - 11 January 1942, commanded by Peter Cundy on a sortie into the Bay of Biscay attacked the German blockade runner: Elsa Essberger and the U-373 which was at the time alongside the German ship. On 28 May 1942, it was attacked and shot down by three Messerschmitt Bf 109Es of 9/JG1 south of the Lofoten Islands, north Norway.
- AM925 (ex 40-2364) s/n 16 was converted to Liberator GR.Mk.I and assigned to 15 Group (CC)/120 Squadron with Squadron Code: OH aircraft X.
  - 6 February 1942, while escorting Convoy SC 118, forces U-262, U-267, U-438, U-456 and U-609 to break off attacks (Pilot: S/L Isted).
  - 18 February 1942, crashed on takeoff: RAF Nutts Corner, Belfast Northern Ireland.
- AM926 (ex 40-2365) s/n 17 was converted to Liberator GR.Mk.I and assigned to 15 Group (CC)/120 Squadron with Squadron Code: OH aircraft F.
  - 10 December 1941, flew into hill on ferry flight: Dyce-Nutts Corner, Ochil Hills near Alva, Clackmannanshire.
- AM927 (ex 40-2366) s/n 18 was assigned to Albuquerque, New Mexico, for crew training at the Eagle Nest Flight Training Center, run by Transcontinental & Western Airlines (TWA).
  - 24 July 1941, crashed on landing – brake failure/right landing gear and nose gear collapsed
  - Salvaged and rebuilt by Consolidated in the fall 1941 to prototype XC-87 configuration – used by Consolidated to carry necessary parts between factories, as well as a corporate transport.
  - 14 February 1945, AM927 had the "short" B-24A nose section removed and had a nose section from an RY-3 installed. At this time, the aircraft also had the PBY-type powerplants (firewall forward) installed, to make the items in the engine compartment interchangeable with aircraft still being produced. (Registered as NL24927, 1 April 1947).
  - 10 November 1948, sold by Consolidated to the Continental Can Company. The aircraft was outfitted with sleeping berths and reclining chairs and was used to transport company executives from its home base in Morristown, New Jersey (Registered N1503).
  - 14 April 1959, sold to Pemex, a Mexican petroleum company. They used the aircraft not only as an executive transport, but to haul drums of oil from place to place. (Registered as XC-CAY, November 1959).
  - May 1968, sold to the Confederate Air Force, initially registered N12905, currently N24927.
- AM928 (ex 40-2367) s/n 19 was converted to Liberator GR.Mk.I and assigned to 15 Group (CC)/120 Squadron with Squadron Code: OH aircraft A.
  - 27 May 1942, undershot landing and hit sand-dunes: Stornoway, United Kingdom.
- AM929 (ex 40-2368) s/n 20 was converted to Liberator GR.Mk.I and assigned to 120 Squadron. Squadron code OH-H. On 12 October 1942, attacked and sunk U-597 southwest of Iceland while on escorting convoy ONS 136. Three days later it attacked U-615 and U-437 while escorting convoy SC 104. On 5 November 1942, attacked and damaged U-132 while escorting convoy SC 107. While escorting Convoy HX 217, on 7 December 1942 it forced four submarines (U-135, U-251, U-461 and U-439) to break off attacks. On 24 June 1943, escorting convoy ONS 11, it attacked and sunk U-200 with 2 depth charges south-west of Iceland. On 17 October 1943, attacked and sunk U-540 while on convoy escort ONS 206 (shared kill with BZ712 of 59 Sqdn east of Cape Farewell, Greenland). It was converted to Liberator C.Mk.I and assigned to 231 Squadron. In April 1945, lost (killing two) when an engine caught fire shortly after takeoff.

== Specifications (Liberator GR.Mk.I) ==
Data from

General characteristics

- Crew: 5
- Length: 63 ft 9 in (19.43 m)
- Wingspan: 110 ft (34 m)
- Height: 18 ft 8 in (5.69 m)
- Wing area: 1,048 sq ft (97.4 m^{2})
- Empty weight: 27,500 lb (12,474 kg)
- Gross weight: 38,360 lb (17,400 kg)
- Max takeoff weight: 46,400 lb (21,047 kg)
- Powerplant: 4 × Pratt & Whitney R-1830 radial piston engine, 1,200 hp (890 kW) each
- Propellers: Hamilton Standard

Performance

- Maximum speed: 273 mph (440 km/h, 237 kn) at 15,500 ft (4,700 m)
- Range: 3,000 mi (4,800 km, 2,600 nmi) with 2,500 lb (1,100 kg) ordnance
- Service ceiling: 31,500 ft (9,600 m)

Armament

- Guns:
  - 5 × .303 in (7.62 mm) Browning Mk.1 machine guns
  - 4 × 20 mm Hispano cannon
- Rockets: 8 x "60lb" RP-3 rocket projectiles

== See also ==
- Commando (aircraft)
- Diamond Lil (aircraft), a surviving Liberator I
