= Crosson =

Crosson is a surname. Notable people with the surname include:

- David Crosson, presenter on The Game Room (later Classic Game Room)
- Iman Crosson (born 1982), American actor
- Joe Crosson (1903–1949), Alaska Hall of Fame pilot, sister Marvel Crosson, Mount Crosson
- Marvel Crosson (1904–1929), Alaska Women's Hall of Fame pilot, sister of Joe

- Mount Crosson, satellite peak to Denali for Joe Crosson

- Norman Crosson, pilot of Little Eva, a B-24 Liberator
- Wilhelmina Marguerita Crosson (1900–1991), American educator
- William Crosson Feazel (1895–1965), Depression-era U.S. Senator from Louisiana

== See also ==
- Crosson Ice Shelf, Antarctic ice shelf
