= RAAF Williams =

Australian military air base

- RAAF Point Cook; RAAF Laverton
- Point Cook and Laverton; Near Melbourne, Victoria in Australia
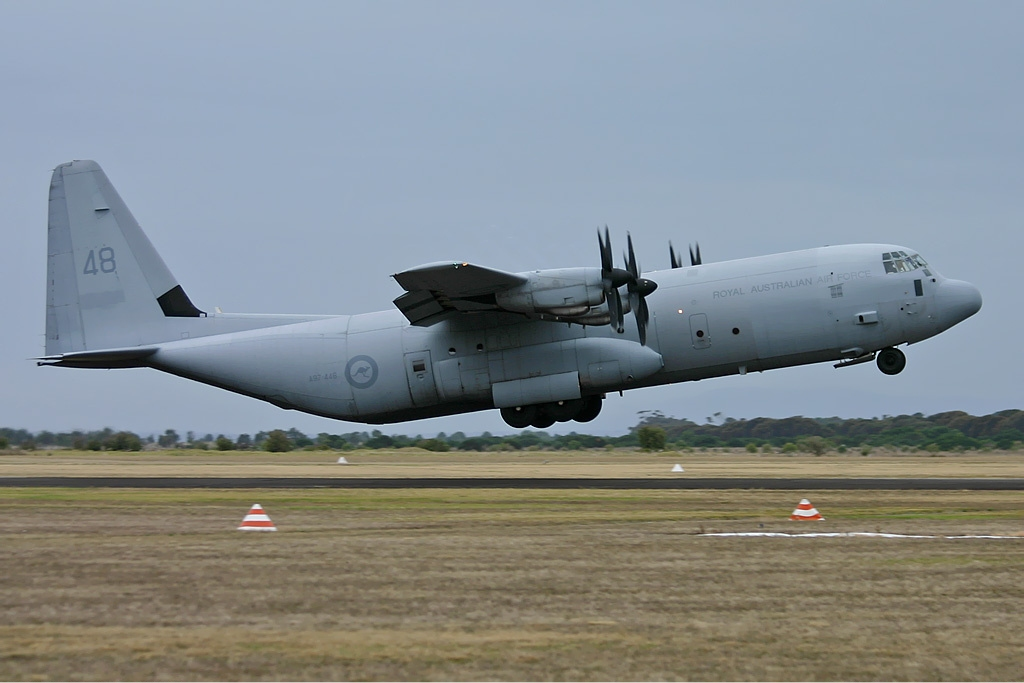
- Take off of a RAAF Lockheed C-130 Hercules at RAAF Williams, Point Cook, in 2006

Site information
- Type: Military air base
- Owner: Department of Defence
- Operator: Royal Australian Air Force
- Website: RAAF Williams

Location
- Location south-west of Melbourne CBD
- Coordinates: 37°55′54″S 144°45′12″E

Garrison information
- Garrison: Air Force Training Group
- Occupants: RAAF College; ADF School of Languages; Defence International Training Centre; No. 21 (City of Melbourne) Squadron; No 1 Security Force Squadron Detachment Williams; RAAF Museum; Air Force Band

Airfield information
- Identifiers: ICAO: YMPC
- Elevation: 4 m (14 ft) AMSL
Runways
Direction	Length and surface
04/22	1,137 m (3,730 ft) Asphalt
08/26	1,066 m (3,497 ft) Grass
17/35	1,374 m (4,508 ft) Asphalt
- Sources: Australian AIP and aerodrome chart

RAAF Williams (ICAO: YMPC) is a Royal Australian Air Force (RAAF) military air base set across two locations, at Point Cook and Laverton, located approximately 20 km (12 mi) south-west of the Melbourne central business district in Victoria, Australia. Both establishments previously existed as separate RAAF Bases (RAAF Base Point Cook and RAAF Base Laverton) until 1989 when they were amalgamated to form RAAF Williams. The name was chosen in honour of Air Marshal Sir Richard Williams, the 'father' of the RAAF.

RAAF Williams, Point Cook is the birthplace of the Royal Australian Air Force and is the oldest continually operating military airfield in the world. Since 1994, RAAF Williams (Point Cook) has been the home of RMIT Flight Training.

== RAAF Base Point Cook ==
The land area at Point Cook was purchased by the Australian Government with the vision to form what would become the Australian Flying Corps. Due to the success of the AFC in the First World War, the AFC became a separate service, now known as the Royal Australian Air Force. Point Cook remained the RAAF's only base until 1925 when RAAF Base Richmond and RAAF Base Laverton were also built.

Point Cook is considered the birthplace and the spiritual home of the RAAF. It is also the airport at which the Royal Victorian Aero Club was established. It contains a memorial parade ground which was built in the 1920s, a site which was previously used by the AFC for drill training. Point Cook still has an operating airfield, but military operations are generally restricted to the museum based there. The airfield is used by a number of general aviation users, although it is still classified as a military aerodrome. It is the oldest continuously operating military aerodrome in the world. Radio communication frequencies include CTAF on 126.2 MHz. The airfield NDB is inactive.

RAAF Williams, Point Cook, is the former home of the RAAF College including Officer Training School (OTS) and the RAAF Academy from 1961 to 1985, and is currently used for the Air Force element of the Australian Defence Force Gap Year Program. All administrative functions are located at RAAF Williams, Laverton, and there is a single mess service (Officers Mess Annexe) which provides a meal service to all personnel, and a bar service to Gap Year students only.

The RAAF Museum is located at Point Cook and has a large collection of ex-RAAF aircraft and military memorabilia from the prewar years until recent decades. The museum is open every day except Monday.

== RAAF Base Williams, Laverton ==
Laverton is the third oldest RAAF base, being built in 1925 at the same time as RAAF Base Richmond, which was opened slightly before Laverton. Located approximately 7 km (4.3 mi) from Point Cook, Laverton is the home of Headquarters Air Force Training Group (formerly Training Command). It also contains all the administrative functions of RAAF Williams. Other units at Laverton are the ADF School of Languages, Defence International Training Centre (DITC), Director General Technical Airworthiness, No. 21 (City of Melbourne) Squadron (RAAF Active Reserve) and a number of smaller sub-units. It also hosts an element of 8th/7th Battalion of the Royal Victoria Regiment, Australian Army Reserve, as well as elements of the Defence Materiel Organisation (DMO).

In 1946, Laverton was host to the first flight of the newly formed Trans Australia Airlines. Its Douglas DC-3, VH-AES Hawdon, was forced to use the base because operations at Essendon had become adversely affected by recent heavy rains. The base hosted the shotgun section of the shooting events for the 1956 Summer Olympics.

The runway at Laverton was decommissioned September 1996. In early 2007, the Victorian Government gave approval for the land that was formerly the Laverton airfield and runway to be developed into the new suburb of Williams Landing. Three areas totalling 55 ha (136 acres) were set aside for conservation. More than 100 ha (247 acres) of nationally significant native grassland outside the reserves was permitted to be cleared by the state- and federal governments. Williams Landing is being developed into a transit-oriented development, major activity centre and employment node. As well as being a major activity centre and employment node, there will also be four residential neighbourhoods each with their own distinctive character. Construction of Williams Landing commenced in late 2007 and is due for completion by 2025.

In 2016, it was speculated that the Department of Defence would completely shut down Laverton and its land sold, under plans by the RAAF to consolidate its facilities towards northern Australia.

== Units ==
The following units are located at RAAF Williams:

Unit	Unit name	Force Element Group	Aircraft	Location	Notes
AFTGHQ	Headquarters Air Force Training Group	Air Force Training Group	—N/a	Laverton	
21SQN	No. 21 (City of Melbourne) Squadron	Combat Support Group	—N/a	Laverton	Airbase operations
	ADF School of Languages	Air Force Training Group	—N/a	Laverton	
	Air Force Band	Air Force Training Group	—N/a	Laverton	
	Combat Support Unit - Williams	Air Force Training Group	—N/a		
	Defence International Training Centre	Air Force Training Group	—N/a	Laverton	Cultural and military familiarisation training for foreign military personnel training in Australia.
	Health Services Training Flight	Air Force Training Group	—N/a		
	RAAF Gap Year Program	Air Force Training Group	—N/a	Point Cook	
	RAAF Museum	Air Force Training Group	Heritage aircraft	Point Cook	
	Air Force Heritage Squadron	Air Force Training Group	Heritage aircraft	Point Cook	RAAF Museum Heritage Flight
	No. 4 Wing Headquarters	Australian Air Force Cadets	—N/a		
	No. 404 Squadron AAFC	Australian Air Force Cadets	—N/a		
	No. 418 Squadron AAFC	Australian Air Force Cadets	—N/a		
8/7 RVR	8th/7th Battalion, Royal Victoria Regiment	Australian Army Reserve	—N/a	Laverton	

== Other activities ==
The 1948 Australian Grand Prix was held on a racetrack mapped out on the runways and support roads of the Point Cook airfield. The race was won by Frank Pratt driving a BMW 328. Also, since 1994 RAAF Williams (Point Cook) has been the home of RMIT Flight Training.

== Werribee Satellite Aerodrome ==
Land was set aside by the Australian Government west of the Williams bases from 1940 to 1952 for a spare grass airfield and aircraft storage. Several hangars and accommodation buildings were built in 1942 by the United States Army Air Forces (USAAF) in the style of US hangars. The USAAF units assigned to Werribee left in 1945. The land was part of what is now the Western Treatment Plant.

Two hangars remain on the land. The northernmost hangar on Geelong Road near Farm Road now houses a former RAAF Consolidated B-24 Liberator under restoration by the B-24 Liberator Memorial Restoration Fund.

== See also ==
- United States Army Air Forces in Australia (World War II)
- List of airports in Victoria
- List of Royal Australian Air Force installations
- RAAF Centenary Air Armada
