= List of surviving Consolidated B-24 Liberators =

The Consolidated B-24 Liberator was an American four-engine heavy bomber used by the United States Army Air Forces (USAAF) and other allied air forces during World War II. Of the 19,256 B-24, PB4Y-1, LB-30 and other model variants in the Liberator family produced, fourteen complete airframes (including one airworthy example) survive today. Nine of the fourteen aircraft reside in the United States.

== Post-World War II ==
The B-24 was quickly declared obsolete by the USAAF and the remaining stateside aircraft were flown to desert storage in the US Southwest. In the Pacific theatre, many were simply parked, the oil drained from their engines and the aircraft left for reclamation by scrappers. The last flight of a B-24 in US military service was on 12 May 1959 when Strawberry Bitch left Bunker Hill Air Force Base (now Grissom Air Force Base), in Peru, Indiana following an Armed Forces Open House. It was bound for the National Museum of the U.S. Air Force at Wright-Patterson Air Force Base, where it is now displayed.

=== Lend-lease ===
While at the end of the war both the British Royal Air Force and the Royal Australian Air Force were willing to continue operating the B-24, the terms of lend-lease agreements stipulated that these aircraft had to be either paid for or returned to the US, and vast graveyards of aircraft accumulated in India as well as Tarakan and Australia.

=== India ===
When India gained independence in 1947, 39 abandoned Liberators were refurbished by Hindustan Aircraft for the Indian Air Force and served until their retirement in 1968. It is to this that six of the remaining fourteen B-24s owe their existence.

== Surviving aircraft ==
=== Surviving aircraft by manufacturer ===
Plant	Number produced	Number surviving
Consolidated San Diego (CO)	6,506	6
Consolidated Fort Worth (CF)	2,745	4
Ford Willow Run (FO)	8,685	4
North American Dallas (NT)	966	0
Douglas Tulsa (DT)	964	0
	19,256	14

=== Surviving aircraft ===
Serial	Geographic location	Institutional location	Status	History	Photo
AM927	Dallas, Texas, United States	Commemorative Air Force	Airworthy	Built at Consolidated San Diego as twenty-fifth LB-30/B-24 series aircraft, contract number 40-2366. Originally ordered by France, then order taken over by Royal Air Force (RAF) and manufactured as RAF serial AM927. Delivered to Transcontinental and Western Air (TWA) for use at a TWA flight school in New Mexico to train RAF crews; involved in landing accident during training flight. Returned to San Diego for repairs and not sent to Britain. Kept by Consolidated and converted to similar standard as C-87, then used as transport aircraft, flying between production facilities; and as flight test aircraft, to help development of later models. Following WW2, ownership formally transferred from Britain to Consolidated in November 1945; sold to Continental Can Co. in 1948 and used as executive aircraft until 1955, then sold to Petroleos Mexicanos for further use as executive aircraft. Purchased in 1969 by Confederate Air Force (now named Commemorative Air Force). In 1971 restored in livery of 98th Bomb Group, Pyramiders of the 9th Air Force. Converted in 2006 to B-24A. Since 2012 wears livery of "Diamond Lil." This is the only airworthy example.	
41-23908	Ogden, Utah, United States	Hill Aerospace Museum	Display	Built at Consolidated San Diego as B-24D-10-CO. Sent to Fort Worth in late 1942 for modifications for Alaskan service. Assigned to 21st Bombardment Squadron at Adak Army Airfield. Crash landed on Great Sitkin Island 18 January 1943 due to bad weather. Located in summer 1994 by Aerospace Heritage Foundation of Utah. Recovered during summer 1995 and sent to California for restoration. Restored fuselage arrived at Hill Aerospace Museum 17 May 2002. Now fully completed.	
42-72843	Dayton, Ohio, United States	National Museum of the United States Air Force	Display	Built at Consolidated San Diego as B-24D-160-CO. Assigned to 512th Bomb Squadron. Flew 56 missions between 20 September 1943 and 10 June 1944. Named as "Strawberry Bitch" at Herington Air Force Base by Flight Engineer Sergeant Haberman. Nose art painted at San Pancrazio, Italy. Returned ZOI 6 July 1944. Stored at Freeman Field, Indiana after WW2. Ferried to United States Air Force Museum in May 1959.	
44-41906	Atwater, California, United States	Castle Air Museum	Display	Built at Consolidated San Diego as B-24M-5-CO. Converted to a US Navy PB4Y-1, BuNo 90155 for use by the United States Marine Corps as transport for the commandant. After the war, flown by Salem Engineering Company as a C-87 until 1951. Flown by Compañía Boliviana de Aviación and Bolivian Overseas Airways until 1973. Purchased by Castle Air Museum in 1982. Wears livery of 42-40369 "Shady Lady." Wears spurious serial 44-41916 on tail.	
44-41956	Werribee, Victoria, Australia	B-24 Liberator Memorial Restoration Fund	Under restoration for display	Built at Consolidated San Diego as B-24M-10-CO. Assigned to RAAF No. 7 OTU as A72-176 at East Sale Airfield. Struck off 23 March 1948. Wings and tail scrapped. Purchased in 1948 by George Toye, and moved to his property in 1952. Stored outside. Under restoration at the former RAAF Werribee by B-24 Liberator Memorial Restoration Fund. Tail and wings taken from 42-41091 "Bunny Hop/Flying Wolf."	
44-44052	Stow, Massachusetts, United States	Collings Foundation	Display	Built at Consolidated Fort Worth as B-24J-85-CF. Delivered to USAAF October 1944. Assigned to the RAF in India and flown as a Liberator GR.VI serial number KH191. Abandoned in Khanpur, India following WW2. One of 39 B-24s restored Hindustan Aircraft and used as T-18 and used at the Indian Air Force Technical College at Jalahalli, India until December 1968. Abandoned in India following service. In 1982, purchased by Doug Arnold and sent to England and stored at Blackbushe until 1986. Purchased by Collings Foundation and rebuilt by Tom Reilly Vintage Aircraft in Kissimmee, Florida, using livery of 42-78444 "All American." First flown 8 August 1989. Repainted as 44-40973 "The Dragon and His Tail" in 1998. In 2005 repainted as 42-52534 "Witchcraft." Flew between 1989 and 2019, but was permanently grounded following the 2019 crash of the Foundation's B-17 Flying Fortress.	
44-44175	Tucson, Arizona, United States	Pima Air and Space Museum	Display	Built at Consolidated Fort Worth as B-24J-90-CF. Delivered to the RAF South East Asia Command and was flown as a Liberator GR.VI serial number KH304. Stricken off charge on 11 April 1946. One of the B-24s used by the Indian Air Force No 6 Maritime Reconnaissance Squadron as serial number HE877 and was operated until 1968. Placed in storage at Poona Air Base. Donated to Pima Air and Space Museum, arriving March 1969. Painted as "Paisano/Shoot You're Covered." Later painted as "Bungay Buckaroo."	
44-44213	Delhi, India	Indian Air Force Museum	Display	Built at Consolidated Fort Worth as B-24J-90-CF. Delivered to the RAF as a Liberator GR.VI serial number KH342. Abandoned in India in 1946. One of 39 B-24s restored by Hindustan Aircraft for use by the Indian Air Force as serial number HE924 and was operated until December 1968. Put on display at the Indian Air Force Museum at Palam following service.	
44-44272	Polk City, Florida, United States	Fantasy of Flight	Display	Built at Consolidated Fort Worth as B-24J-95-CF. Delivered to the RAF South East Asia Command as a Liberator B.VI serial number KH401. One of 39 B-24s restored by Hindustan Aircraft for use by the Indian Air Force as serial number HE771 and flown until December 1968. Acquired by Acquired by Dave Tallichet and his Yesterdays Air Force of Chino, CA in 1973. Returned to the US from Poona, India in October 1973. Made a stop at Duxford, UK from some maintenance work and to have the number three engine replaced. Aircraft was painted in the markings of “Delectable Doris”, a Ford built B-24J-1-FO, serial number 42-50551 with the 566th Bomb Squadron, 389th Bomb Group based at Hethel. It departed Duxford in September 1975. Restored by Military Aircraft Restoration Corporation in 1982. Loaned to March Field Air Museum in 1984 and to Mid-America Air Museum in 1987. Acquired in 2001 by Fantasy of Flight. Although not airworthy, it is registered with FAA as N94459. Wears livery of 42-50551 "Joe."	
44-48781	Bossier City, Louisiana, United States	Barksdale Global Power Museum	Display	Built by Ford at its Willow Run assembly plant as B-24J-20-FO. After delivery to the USAAF, it served as a combat crew trainer at Chanute Field, Illinois, and Lowry Field, Colorado. Struck off charge on 7 December 1945 and flown to Altus Army Air Field, Oklahoma to the RFC Center there. Purchased by Spartan School of Aeronautics, Tulsa, Oklahoma and used as and instructional airframe. Later stripped of its engines and left derelict. Sold as scrap in 1962 to A&S Scrap Metal in Tulsa and stored at the Tulsa Airport. Purchased in 1978 by National Museum of the United States Air Force. Transferred to Barksdale AFB in December 1978 via two CH-54 Skycrane helicopters from the Kansas Army National Guard. Restored in 1982 with livery of "Laden Maiden." Later painted as "Louisiana Belle II." Now wears livery of "Rupert The Roo II", 42-73076. This is the sole remaining Ford-built B-24J Liberator. In June 2025, it was announced that this Liberator would be transferred to the National Museum of the Mighty Eighth Air Force in Pooler, Georgia. Crews began Phase I of dismantling the Liberator in February 2026. Phase II was completed in August 2026. The aircraft departed Barksdale AFB for a specialized restoration facility where it will be stripped of its current paint scheme and restored; once complete, the aircraft will be shipped to Pooler and reassembled. It is anticipated that the aircraft will arrive in Pooler in early spring 2027.	
44-50154	Ottawa, Canada	Canada Aviation and Space Museum	Display	Built at Ford Willow Run as B-24L-20-FO. Delivered to RAF in 1944 as a Liberator B.VIII serial number KN820. Abandoned in India after WWII. One of 39 B-24s restored by Hindustan Aircraft for use by the Indian Air Force as serial number HE773 and used until December 1968. After a Lysander from the National Air Museum was given to the Indian Air Force, the Indian Air Force reciprocated with HE773. Arrived in Canada June 1968. Wears livery of 44-50186 (RCAF 11130) of RCAF Eastern Air Command.	
44-50206	Hendon, London, United Kingdom	Royal Air Force Museum London	Display	Built at Ford Willow Run as B-24L-20-FO. Held in operational reserve until April 1945. Sent to Louisville, Kentucky in April 1945 for modifications. Flown to Dorval Field, Montreal, Quebec 2 June 1945. Sent to the RAF 231 Group in Dhubalia, India as a Liberator B.VI serial number KN751. Served with 99 Squadron at Cocos Islands. One of 39 B-24s restored by Hindustan Aircraft for use by the Indian Air Force as serial number HE807 until December 1968. Presented as gift to RAF Museum on 1 July 1974. Flown to UK and arrived 7 July at RAF Lyneham. Moved to Cosford in 1976. Painted in 99 Squadron markings with the "Flying Bee." motif. (Note: The Flying Bee had been used on 99 Squadron Liberator KH399 coded "B".) Transported to Hendon in September 2005.	
44-51228	Duxford, Cambridgeshire, United Kingdom	Imperial War Museum Duxford	Display	Built at Ford Willow Run as B-24M-20-FO. Assigned to Wright Aeronautical Development Center for ice research. It was retired in 1954 as the last B-24 Liberator in USAF service. The aircraft was moved to Lackland AFB Museum in Texas in 1954 and placed on display in 1956. Acquired by IWM-Duxford in 1999 in exchange for several other aircraft. It was shipped via an USAF C-5 Galaxy to RAF Mildenhall in the United Kingdom where it was off loaded and sent overland to the Imperial War Museum at Duxford. It was restored and reassembled and then put on display in the American Air Museum in 2002. Wears livery of 44-50493 "Dugan.", a B-24M-5-FO, 44-50493 that flew with the 578th Bomb Squadron, 392nd Bomb Group based at Wendling. Dedication ceremony in March 2001 attended by George H. W. Bush.	
AL557	South Carolina, United States	Project Warbird	Under restoration to airworthiness	Built at Consolidated San Diego as a Liberator II (LB-30). The aircraft was part of a batch of 165 Liberator IIs ordered directly by the RAF without USAAF contract numbers. AL557 was taken on charge in Dorval, Quebec, Canada on 13 October 1941. Beginning 17 March 1942, the aircraft was assigned and operated with 224 Squadron and 120 Squadrons of the RAF Coastal Command. AL557 also flew with the 511 Squadron with British Overseas Aviation Corporation (BOAC) for the North Atlantic Return Ferry Service for the RAF Ferry Command where it was used as a freighter and to bring RAF crews to Canada, where they picked up lend-lease aircraft to ferry back to England. On 14 November 1942, the aircraft was operated by the RAF 1445 Flight. On 10 July 1943, it was flown to India and was assigned to the Southeast Asia Command with 159 Squadron for use as a transport. It left India on 23 May 1944 and was taken on charge with the Mediterranean Allied Air Forces on 22 February 1945. In April 1945, it was flown to Scotland to Scottish Aviation Ltd for conversion to passenger use. It was registered as G-AGZI with Scottish Aviation. On 1 March 1948, the aircraft was sold and was re-registered as SX-DAA "Maid of Athens" with Hellenic Airways in Athens, Greece. On 11 December 1951, the aircraft was sold to the Morrison-Knudson Company Inc out of Seattle, WA. It was re-registered as N9981F, then re-registered again as N68735. The aircraft was damaged when it skidded into a ditch on landing at Wales. AK on 1 June 1953. It was repaired and re-registered as N92MK. The aircraft crashed at Kalikat Creek, Alaska in 1958 and was abandoned. It was recovered in 1990 by Alaska Aviation Heritage Museum. The aircraft was sold in 1996 to the Lone Star Flight Museum of Galveston, TX. It was purchased later that year by Don Whittington/World Jet, out of Ft. Lauderdale, FL. The aircraft remains have been stored at Vintage Aircraft, Ltd in Ft. Collins, CO since 1996. In June 2023 the remains were purchased by Project Warbird out of Anderson, SC for restoration to flying status.	

== Known wrecks ==
Serial	Location	Coordinates	History	Photo
40-2367	United States	52.030395°N 175.136921°W	Built at Consolidated San Diego as B-24A. Force-landed on Atka Island, Alaska 9 December 1942 due to poor weather. Listed on National Register of Historic Places in 1979. Designated part of the World War II Valor in the Pacific National Monument in 2008.	
41-23762	Australia	17.333611°S 139.000833°E	Built at Consolidated San Diego as B-24D. Named "Little Eva." Crashed near Gulf of Carpentaria on 3 December 1942. The wreckage is located to the north of Doomadgee.	
41-24301	Libya	32.084775°N 23.967476°E	Built at Consolidated San Diego as B-24D. Named "Lady Be Good." Crashed in Libyan desert 4 April 1943. Discovered in November 1958. Removed in 1994 and now in the city of Tobruk, Libya.	
41-24311	Turkey	41.04227°N 28.94926°E	Built at Consolidated San Diego as B-24D. "Hadley's Harem." Crashed near Antalya, Turkey after Operation Tidal Wave. Recovered in 1995 and put on display at Rahmi M. Koç Museum.	
42-40885	Papua New Guinea	8.598728°S 148.249611°E	Built at Consolidated San Diego as B-24D. Crashed on 18 October 1943. Wreckage is situated north of Gona.	
42-40910	United States	64.817856°N 143.522603°W	Built at Consolidated San Diego as B-24D. Nicknamed "Iceberg Inez." Crashed on 21 December 1943. Wreckage is situated in the Yukon-Charley Rivers National Preserve in Alaska.	
42-51430	Croatia	43.013095°N 16.211020°E	Built at Douglas Tulsa as B-24J. Named "Tulsamerican." Crash landed 17 December 1944 off coast of Vis on way back to Italy. Notable as last B-24 built at Douglas Tulsa plant. Discovered in late 2010. Was the subject of a NOVA episode entitled "The Last B-24."	
42-51874	Croatia	43.101362°N 17.114182°E	Built at Ford Willow Run as B-24J. "Le Petite Fleur." Ditched off the island of Hvar 20 November 1944 after bombing raid on Blechhammer, Germany. Discovered in 2014.	
42-73134	Australia	12.432249°S 130.696694°E	Built at Consolidated San Diego as B-24J. Named "Milady." Crashed near Wagait Beach near Darwin, Northern Territory on 7 January 1945. Listed on the Northern Territory Heritage Register on 4 July 2001.	
42-50890	Arizona, United States	35.340898°N 111.690295°W	Built at Ford Willow Run as B-24J. Crashed in Arizona on 15 September 1944 while en route from Bakersfield, California to Kirtland Field, New Mexico. It flew off-course and crashed into a boulder field near the top of Humphreys Peak at 0330 hrs.	
41-24236	Canada	46.250833°N 74.296750°W	The lost aircraft, Consolidated Liberator III (B-24D) serial number 41-24236, was purchased in September 1942 from the United States Army Air Forces (USAAF) as part of a four aircraft order. Once in RCAF service, the aircraft received the tail number 3701H and was to be used by No. 10 Squadron RCAF for anti-submarine warfare (ASW). However, it was deemed that the four aircraft were not capable of the ASW mission, so they were employed for training and general transport. Wreck on 20 October 1943, discovered on 20 June 1946.	
