= 1948 Australian Grand Prix =

- Formula Libre handicap race

Race details
- Date: 26 January 1948
- Location: Point Cook, Victoria
- Course: Airfield circuit
- Course length: 3.85 km (2.4 miles)
- Distance: 42 laps, 100.8 km (162.19 miles)
- Weather: Sunny

Fastest lap
Driver	(Australia) Alf Barrett	Alfa Romeo
- Time: 1'48

Podium
First	(New Zealand) Frank Pratt	BMW
Second	(Australia) Alf Najar	MG
Third	(Australia) Dick Bland	Reed-Ford

The 1948 Australian Grand Prix was a motor race held at the Point Cook Aerodrome, a Royal Australian Air Force base at Point Cook, just outside Melbourne in Victoria, Australia on Australia Day, 26 January 1948. It was staged over 42 laps of a 3.85 kilometre circuit utilizing the runways and service roads of the base. The total race distance was 162 kilometres. The race was organised by the Light Car Club of Australia and was sanctioned by the Australian Automobile Association. 17,000 people attended the event.

The race was the thirteenth Australian Grand Prix and the first not to be held on a public road circuit. It was staged as a handicap event with the first car starting 18 minutes before the last. Conditions were oppressive, with the temperature topping 100 °F (38 °C) by mid-morning, along with hot winds buffeting the exposed pits on the start/finish straight. The overpowering heat, plus the bumpy concrete-slab surface of the runways, took a heavy toll on the competing cars. As well as mechanical retirements, several drivers had to retire due to heat exhaustion.

Prominent motorcycle racer Frank Pratt won the race driving a BMW 328. Alf Najar finished second driving an MG TB Special with Dick Bland placed third in a George Reed constructed Ford V8 special. Bland was also awarded the prize for setting the fastest time.

== Classification ==
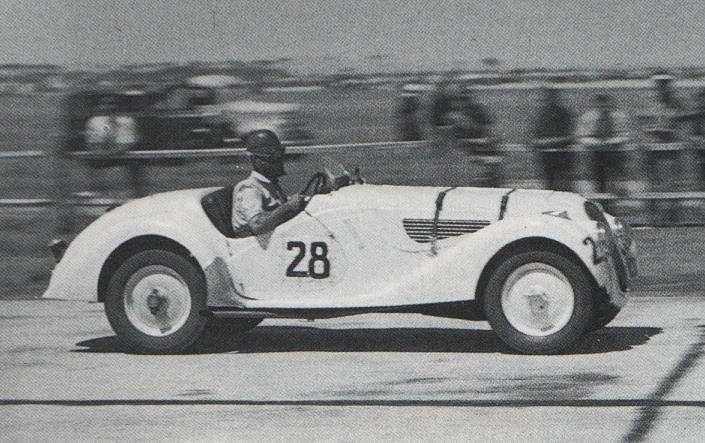
Race winner Frank Pratt (BMW 328) contesting the 1948 Australian Grand Prix

Alf Najar placed second driving an MG TB Special

Dick Bland placed third driving a G. Reed Ford V8 Special

Results as follows.

Pos	No.	Driver	Car / Engine	Entrant	Handicap	Laps	Time
1	28	(New Zealand) Frank Pratt	BMW 328 / BMW 2.0L	L. F. Pratt	13-30	42	1h 33m 52s
2	31	(Australia) Alf Najar	MG TB Special / MG 1.3L	A. Najar	13-30	42	1h 34m 35s
3	11	(Australia) Dick Bland	G. Reed Ford V8 Special / Ford 4.0L	R. Bland	9-30	42	1h 35m 19s
4	12	(Australia) Granton Harrison	Ford V8 Special / Ford 3.6L	G. Harrison	9-30	42	1h 35m 58s
5	26	(Australia) Dennis Curran	Willys Ford V8 Special / Ford 3.9L	D. Curran	12-30	42	1h 36m 05s
6	30	(Australia) John Barraclough	MG NE / MG 1.3L	J. Barraclough	13-30	42	1h 37m 02s
7	27	(Australia) Bill Ford	Hudson Special / Hudson 3.5L	W. D. Ford	12-30	42	1h 38m 00s
8	3	(Australia) John Crouch	Delahaye 135 / Delahaye 3.6L	J. Crouch	6-30	42	1h 39m 00s
9	10	(Australia) Alec Mildren	Ford V8 Special / Ford 3.6L	A. G. Mildren	9-30	42	1h 40m 22s
10	22	(Australia) Ron Head	Riley Imp / Riley 1.1L	R. Head	10-30	42	1h 42m 13s
NC	41	(Australia) Cec Warren	Morgan / Matchless 0.4L	C. R. Warren	18-00	37	
NC	23	(Australia) Jim Skinner	Ballot 8 / Ford 3.6L	J. Skinner	11-30	36	
NC	35	(Australia) Bill Patterson	MG TC / MG 1.3L	G. W. Patterson	16-30	34	
NC	19	(Australia) Arthur Chick	Bugatti Type 37 / Bugatti 2.3L	A. Chick	10-30	16	
Ret	4	(Australia) Doug Whiteford	Ford V8 Special / Ford 4.2L	D. Whiteford	6-30	34	
Ret	5	(Australia) Hope Bartlett	Dixon Riley / Riley 1.8L	H. Bartlett	6-30	32	
Ret	2	(Australia) Alf Barrett	Alfa Romeo Monza / Alfa Romeo 2.4L	A. I. Barrett	3-00	22	
Ret	6	(Australia) Lex Davison	Mercedes-Benz 38/250 / Mercedes-Benz 7.4L	A. N. Davison	8-30	17	
Ret	38	(Australia) Tom Sulman	Singer Special / Singer 1.0L	T. Sulman	17-30	16	
Ret	20	(Australia) Jim Gullan	Ballot / Oldsmobile 3.9L	J. Gullan	10-30	15	
Ret	16	(Australia) Reg Nutt	Cadillac Special / Cadillac	A. C. Cooper	9-30	14	
Ret	14	(Australia) Charlie Dean	Maybach I / Maybach 4.3L	H. C. Dean	9-30	12	
Ret	21	(Australia) John Nind	MG TB Special / MG 1.3L	J. Nind	13-30	10	
Ret	18	(Australia) Tom Luxton	Nuttbug Bugatti Type 40 / Ford 3.6L	J. McEwan	10-30	7	
Ret	1	(Australia) Tony Gaze	Alta / Alta 2.0L	F. A.O. Gaze	Scratch	5	
Ret	7	(Australia) Norm Andrews	Stewand / Lea-Francis 3.5L	N. Andrews	8-30	0	

== Notes ==
- Fastest lap: Alf Barrett (Alfa Romeo Monza), 1m 48s, 80.00 mph (128.7 km/h)
- Fastest time: Dick Bland (G Reed Ford V8 Special), 1h 26m 52s, 69.62 mph (112.02 km/h)

Preceded by 1947 Australian Grand Prix	Australian Grand Prix; 1948	Succeeded by 1949 Australian Grand Prix
