= Humphrey de Verd Leigh =

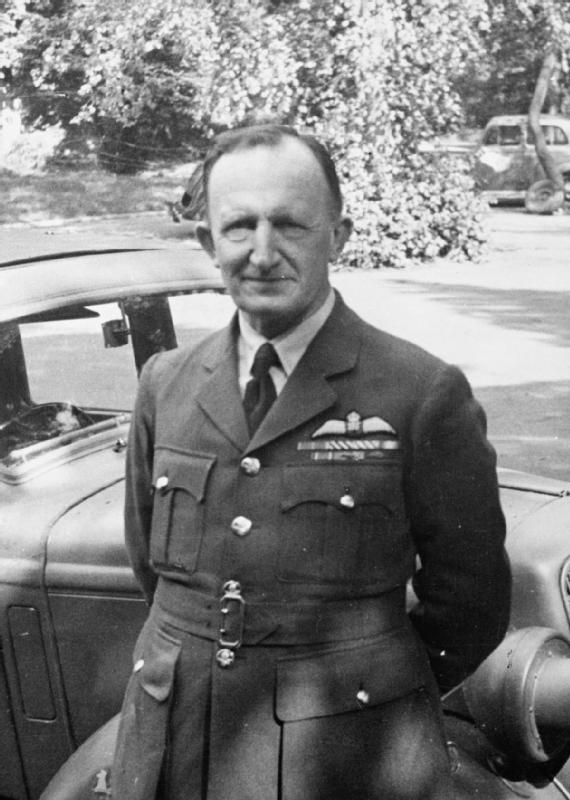
- Wing Commander de Verd Leigh
- Born: 26 July 1897; Aldershot, Hampshire
- Died: 6 June 1980 (aged 82)
- Military career
- Allegiance: United Kingdom
- Branch: Royal Naval Air Service; Royal Air Force
- Service years: 1915–1919; 1939–1945
- Rank: Wing Commander
- Conflicts: World War I World War II
- Awards: Order of British Empire; Distinguished Flying Cross; Air Force Cross

Wing Commander Humphrey de Verd Leigh, OBE, DFC, AFC (1897–1980) was a Royal Air Force officer.

Leigh's idea during World War II for an anti-submarine spotlight for Coastal Command was developed and named the Leigh Light.

== Early life ==
Humphrey de Verd Leigh was born at Aldershot, Hampshire on 26 July 1897, the son of Agnes Mary Leigh (1859–1944) and John de Verd Leigh (1861–1947), the Vicar of Holy Trinity Church in Aldershot from 1889 to 1912. He was christened by his father at that church in August 1897.

== Military career ==
He was commissioned in the Royal Naval Air Service (RNAS) in 1915, gaining his Royal Aero Club Aviators' certificate as a flight sub-lieutenant on 13 June 1915 at Hendon. He was promoted flight lieutenant in 1916 and served in Mesopotamia (now Iraq), flying seaplanes for the relief of Kut, and went on to serve in the early Royal Air Force (RAF) 1918–1919. Resigning his commission in 1919 Leigh went into business, working for many years in the Sudan in the cotton industry. A Freemason, he was initiated into the Walden Lodge No. 1280 at Saffron Walden in 1921, at which time he gave his profession as "engineer".

In 1935 he married Johanna Emily Whitefield Hayes (1910–1999) at Chelsea in London. Their daughter was Ursula de Verd Leigh. In 1939 he and his wife were living at Great Cumberland Place in Marylebone in London with Leigh listing his occupation as sales manager for a bituminous roofing company.

== WWII ==
Upon the outbreak of World War II Leigh re-joined the RAF in September 1939, serving in personnel and staff duties for Coastal Command from 1939 until 1945.

His successful development of the Leigh Light, at his own volition and risk, and without approval of his senior commanders at the time made a significant contribution to the Battle of the Atlantic (1942).

Appointed an Officer of the Order of the British Empire on 1 January 1943, having been awarded the Air Force Cross on 8 June 1941, in 1954 he resigned his military commission.

== Later life ==
In his latter years he lived at Richmond Hill in Richmond in London, and here he died on 6 June 1980. In his will, he left £19,221.
