= RAAF Centenary Air Armada =

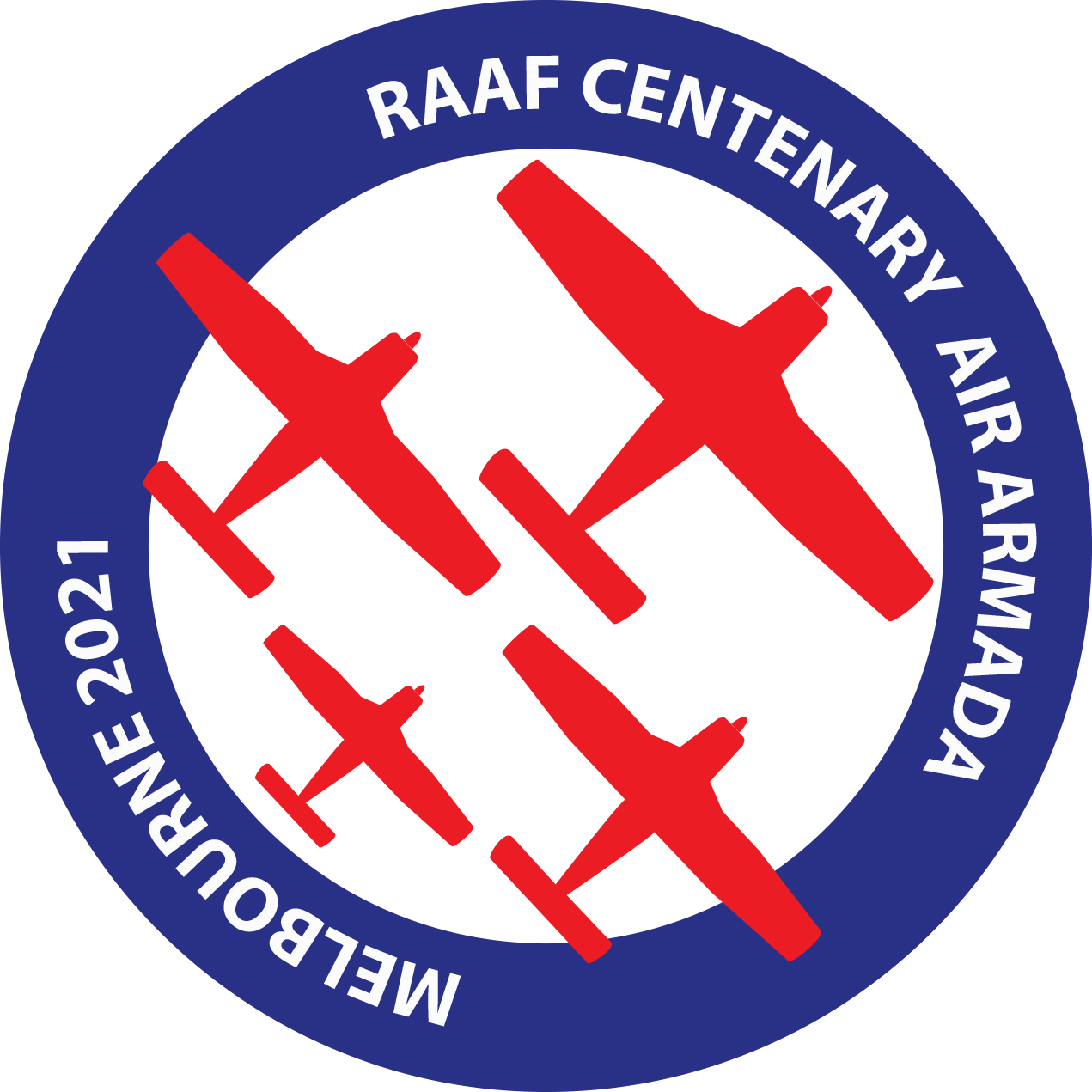
RAAF Centenary Air Armada logo

On 28 March 2021, 46 civil light aircraft flew in a massed formation over RAAF Point Cook, in Victoria, Australia, to commemorate the centenary of the Royal Australian Air Force. The RAAF Centenary Air Armada was organised by members of the Royal Victorian Aero Club, the Peninsula Aero Club, and the Lilydale Flying Club.

There is a close link between the formation of the Royal Australian Air Force and civil aero clubs. The Australian Aero Club (now Royal Victorian Aero Club) was formed at Point Cook in 1915. Club members led by Dicky Williams campaigned for an Australian air force, and in 1921, the RAAF was formed at Point Cook. The base is now named after Air Marshall Sir Richard Williams, the father of the RAAF. The Air Armada was a means for aero clubs to celebrate 100 years of the RAAF, demonstrating comradeship, determination, planning, and skill.

== The Air Armada ==
The Air Armada was made up of two Balbos of multiple aircraft formations. Balbo One (slow) was composed of four formations of between 5 and 10 aircraft each, flying at between 90 and 110 knots. Balbo Two (fast) was composed of three formations of between 5 and 7 aircraft each, flying at between 115 and 130 knots. The formations took off from three separate airfields in the Melbourne area: Lilydale, Moorabbin, and Tyabb, and joined up following a precise plan into the two Balbos. The join up occurred over the Mornington Peninsula and Westernport Bay. The flight paths of the two Balbos was different, to account for the different cruising speeds, but both joined up over the Point Cook Air Force Base (RAAF Williams) to form an Air Armada. For a period of one minute, all aircraft operated as one formation flight, under the control of Green Romeo 1, a Beechcraft Baron piloted by James Cherry.

The flight time for some Balbo 1 aircraft was close to two hours, which is a long time for pilots to hold aircraft in formation. The Balbos were deconstructed over Port Phillip Bay, and returned safely to Lilydale, Moorabbin and Tyabb.

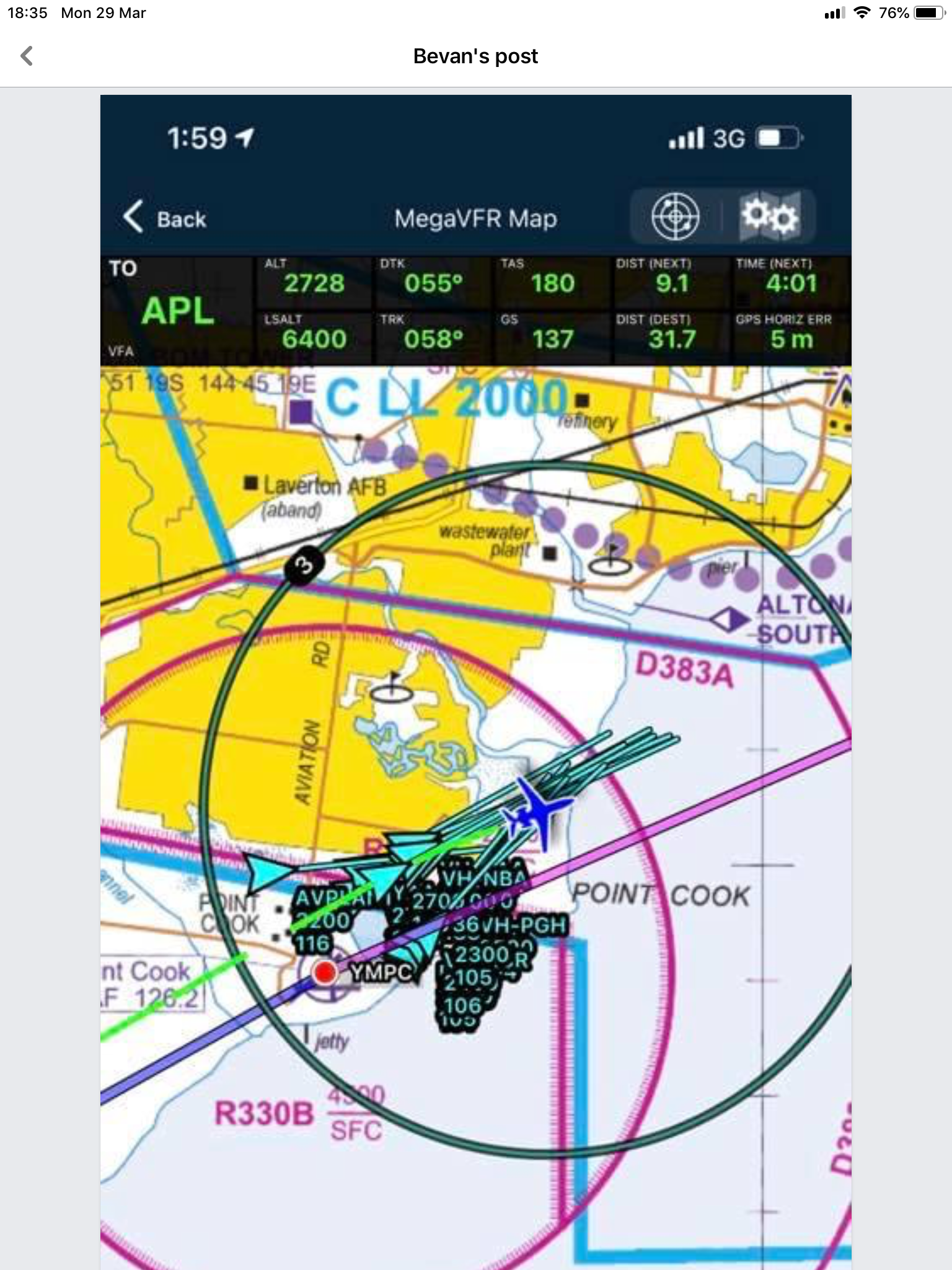
Air Armada Over Point Cook

== Aircraft Types Involved ==
The types of aircraft involved in the Air Armade were:

- PAC CT-4B
- NZAI CT-4A
- AESL Airtourer T6/24
- Piper Warrior
- Piper Cherokee
- Piper Archer
- Cessna 170
- Victa Airtourer
- ACA Super Decathlon
- Cessna 172
- Cessna 182
- Sling 2 LSA
- Blackshape Prime
- Beechcraft Baron
- Piper Twin Comanche
- Beechcraft A36 Bonanza
- Piper Cherokee Lance
- Vans RV-6
- Vans RV-7
- Vans RV-8
- Yakovlev Yak 52
- Nanchang CJ-6A
- Socata Trinidad

== Camera Aircraft ==
In addition to the formation aircraft, a 47th aircraft, a Cessna 182 crewed by Jock Folan and Angela Stevenson, flew above the Air Armada over Point Cook, also under the direction of the formation leader.

== Organising Committee ==
The Air Armada event took seven months of organising, much during Covid lockdowns. The original objective of 100 aircraft was not achievable due to lockdowns and restrictions on interstate and international travel, so the target was adjusted to 37, to match the world record for the largest civilian formation flight (set in the US in 2009).

The Committee comprised

- Murray Gerraty (designer)
- Ray Taylor
- Paul Canavan
- Doug Berge
- Jock Folan
- Graham Bunn
- Steve Hitchen
- Angela Stevenson
- Tony Self

The event did not receive any external funding. The costs of operating the aircraft, landing fees, fuel and in some cases aircraft hire was all paid for by the participating pilots. This included for the proving and practice flights in the weeks and months prior to the event. However, Airservices Australia and the Civil Aviation Safety Authority provided advice and organising support.
