= Diamond Lil (aircraft) =

Consolidated B-24 Liberator warbird

- Diamond Lil during the 2019 Wings Over Dallas airshow

General information
- Other name: Ol' 927
- Type: Consolidated LB-30B Liberator Mk.I (Note: Diamond Lil is restored to represent a B-24A. The aircraft had previously been used as the prototype for the C-87 Liberator Express.)
- Manufacturer: Consolidated Aircraft
- Status: Airworthy
- Owners: Commemorative Air Force
- Registration: N24927
- Serial: AM927

History
- Manufactured: 1940
- First flight: 1941

Diamond Lil is a Consolidated B-24 Liberator operated by the Commemorative Air Force as a warbird. The 25th Liberator built, Diamond Lil is the oldest surviving B-24 and the oldest airworthy heavy bomber. Built for the Royal Air Force as a Liberator Mk.I, the aircraft never saw combat and instead remained in the United States to train RAF pilots in the early days of World War II. After being damaged in a landing accident, the aircraft was used by Consolidated Aircraft as the prototype of the C-87 Liberator Express. The aircraft changed hands multiple times after the war before being acquired by the CAF in the late 1960s.

== History ==
=== World War II ===
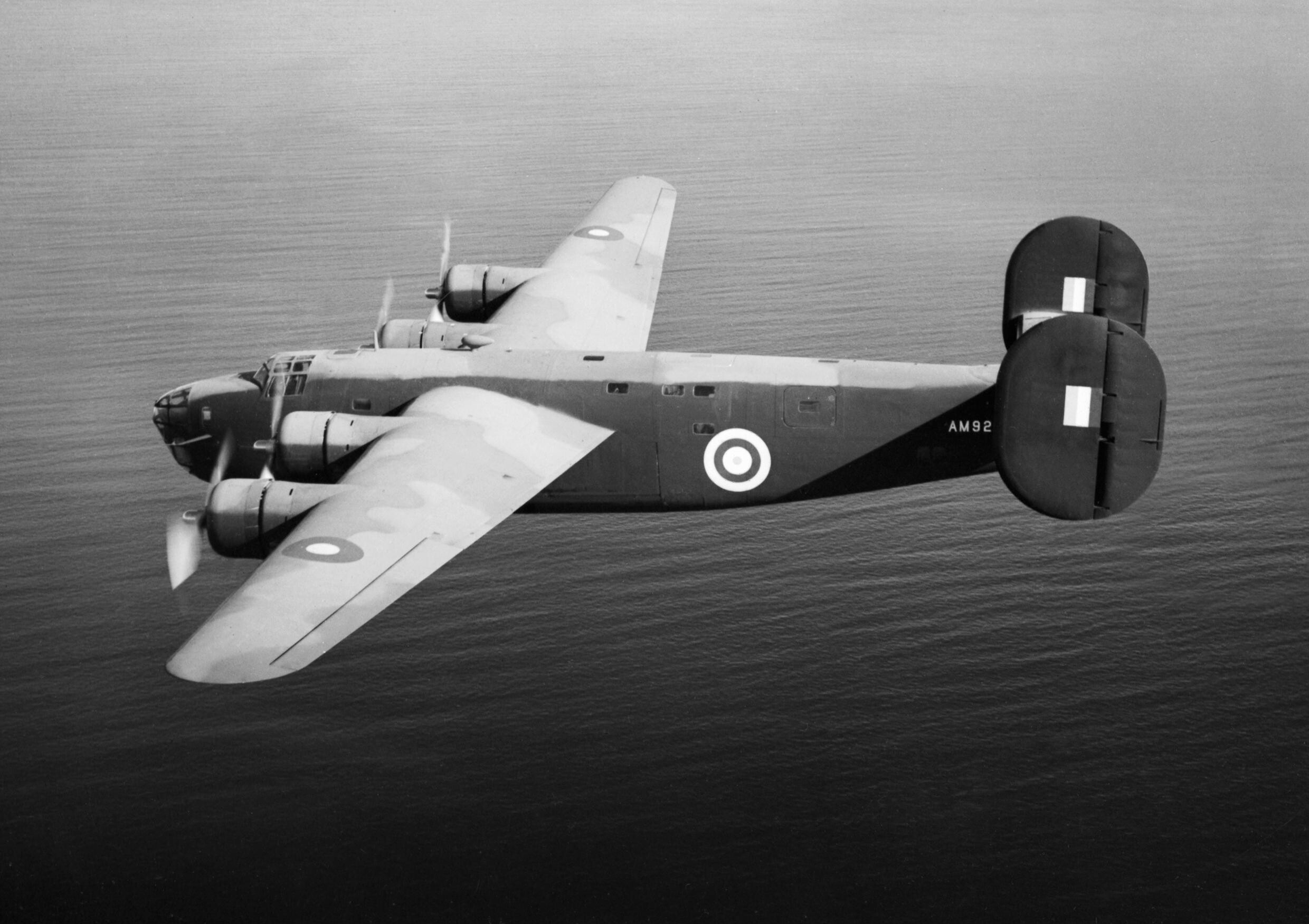
AM922, sister aircraft of AM927, during a ferry flight over the Atlantic

The aircraft that would eventually become Diamond Lil was originally ordered as a B-24A for France in 1940. After the fall of France later that year prevented its delivery, the order was diverted to the Royal Air Force. The aircraft was completed in 1940 as an LB-30B (British designation Liberator Mk.I) with company serial number 18, being the 25th Liberator built overall. The aircraft was accepted by the Air Ministry in May 1941 and given the RAF serial number AM927.

AM927 configured as the C-87 Liberator Express prototype.

Unlike the other Liberator Mk.Is, AM927 was not delivered to the United Kingdom. Instead, it was sent to the Eagle's Nest Flight Center in Albuquerque, New Mexico, where it was used by Transcontinental & Western Air to train RAF pilots. Barely a month after delivery, AM927 suffered a runway excursion during landing practice and sustained damage to its nose and bomb bay. The RAF lent AM927 to Consolidated Aircraft, which repaired the aircraft and flew it to its plant in San Diego, California, in late 1941. Consolidated converted the aircraft into the prototype of the C-87 Liberator Express transport, with the glazed bombardier nose being replaced by an aluminum nose cap and the bomb bay doors being replaced by a solid fuselage belly structure with windows and seats. The company used AM927 to transport personnel and parts.

Throughout the war, Consolidated retrofitted AM927 with features of newer Liberator variants. These included the 3 feet (0.9 m) nose extension introduced on the B-24C and the simplified knife-edge canopy of late-war Ford-built B-24 variants. The original inward-opening nosewheel doors were replaced with outward-opening units. Consolidated also fitted the aircraft with power packages from the Consolidated PBY Catalina, as both aircraft used Pratt & Whitney R-1830 Twin Wasp engines. Though the aircraft was still owned by the RAF and operated under its British serial number, AM927 was painted with United States Army Air Forces markings during its time with Consolidated.

=== Post-war ===
N1503 in Continental Can Company livery

In November 1945, the RAF transferred ownership of AM927 to Convair (the successor of Consolidated), which applied the civilian registration NL24927 to the aircraft. Three years later, Convair sold NL24927 to the Continental Can Company, which re-registered the aircraft as N1503 and used it as a luxury executive transport. During its time with Continental Can, N1503 was fitted with a sideways-opening nose cap that may have been a radome. In 1959, Continental Can sold N1503 to Pemex, which re-registered the aircraft as XC-CAY.

Diamond Lil in 2006 prior to being reconfigured as a bomber. At this time, the aircraft had been fitted with a glazed bomber nose, but retained the solid fuselage belly, windows, and streamlined tail cone from its time as a C-87 transport.

The Confederate Air Force acquired XC-CAY on loan from Pamex in 1967 before buying the aircraft the following year. The CAF registered the aircraft as N12905, and in 1971 repainted it in desert camouflage and named it Diamond Lil. By 1981, Diamond Lil had been refitted with a plexiglass bomber nose, though the rest of the aircraft remained in C-87 configuration. In 1990, Diamond Lil was re-registered as N24927.

Between 2006 and 2007, the renamed Commemorative Air Force restored Diamond Lil to represent a B-24A. The C-87 fuselage windows were reskinned, while original windows and gun ports that had previously been fared over were opened up. The bomb bay was restored with doors and bomb racks, and replica of a B-24A tail gun mount replaced the streamlined tail cone. While the late-war knife-edge canopy was not replaced, the CAF replicated the appearance of a B-24A canopy by placing aluminum strips along the top. The aircraft was known as Ol' 927 for a few years after the restoration before being renamed back to Diamond Lil in 2012. As of 2023, the aircraft retains its three-foot nose extension. In April 2012, Diamond Lil suffered a nosewheel collapse due to a hydraulic failure. Repairs were completed the following year and the aircraft returned to flight in July 2013.

As of 2023, Diamond Lil is the oldest surviving B-24 Liberator, the only Liberator still flying, and the oldest flying heavy bomber in the world. In 2024, Diamond Lil was grounded for an extensive restoration. The aircraft made its first post-restoration flight in April 2026.

== See also ==
- Commando (aircraft), another early-production Liberator modified as a passenger transport
- FIFI (aircraft), a Boeing B-29 Superfortress flown by the same Commemorative Air Force squadron as Diamond Lil
