= B-24 Liberator Memorial Australia =

Australian aviation museum

- Formation: December 1989 (formal incorporation)
- Headquarters: Werribee, Victoria, Australia
- President: Lyn Gorman
- Vice-President: John Phillips
- Secretary: Graham Collis
- Treasurer: Gary Singline
- Website: http://b24australia.org.au/
- Formerly called: B-24 Liberator Memorial Fund B-24 Liberator Memorial Restoration Fund

B-24 Liberator Memorial Australia (formerly the B-24 Liberator Memorial Restoration Fund) is an Australian non-profit organisation founded in 1988 to acquire and restore a Consolidated B-24 Liberator for display as a memorial to all allied airmen who served on B-24 Liberators during World War II in defence of Australia.

The major parts of the airframe were acquired in the 1990s and the aircraft under restoration is located in Werribee, Victoria, Australia in a World War II era hangar. The aircraft is not expected to be made flightworthy but will be put on display restored to its original appearance.

== Consolidated B-24 Liberator ==
=== Background ===
287 American-made B-24s were flown by the Royal Australian Air Force during the Second World War. They were used to equip seven bomber squadrons, an operational training unit and two independent flights. They were operated as bombers, used in covert operations, and after the war were used to repatriate prisoners of war to Australia. The RAAF flew B-24s until 1948. In due course the Liberators, as with many other ex-military aircraft, were often sold for scrap or for their new owners to use as sheds.

=== Liberator "Bunny Hop/Flying Wolf" 42-41091 ===
The B-24D Liberator with Serial Number 42-41091 was built in San Diego by Consolidated, and flown to Australia via Hawaii to be deployed in New Guinea for the campaign against the Japanese. During an armed reconnaissance over Wewak on 23 December 1943, it was attacked by two Japanese fighters; with the hydraulics shot-out and two of the crew injured, it was unable to return to base and instead force-landed at Faita Airfield. During the war it was stripped of usable equipment, and the rest of the wreckage was left where it had landed (part of which can still be seen). It was originally named "Bunny Hop", but was carrying the name "Flying Wolf" at the time of its final flight. In the late 1990s its wings were recovered by the B-24 Liberator Restoration Fund for use in the restoration of B-24M Liberator A72-176.

=== Liberator A72-176 ===
A72-176 (RAAF number) / 44-41956 (USAAF Number) was a B-24M Liberator delivered to the RAAF. It was not used in combat, but was used at RAAF Station Tocumwal as a training aircraft for new B-24 crews. It was scrapped in 1948 and it was sold to George Toye, a Moe photographer who transported the fuselage to his property in Moe, Victoria to live in while he was building his home. He later used the fuselage as a wood shed, and after that it simply sat in his backyard. The first part of the Liberator was a hubcap found at the former RAAF Station Tocumwal in New South Wales. In 1989 the group became aware of the Moe Liberator fuselage and after negotiations to purchase it the fuselage of the Liberator was acquired in 1995. The tail and wings of Liberator 42-41091 (USAAF number) were recovered in the late 1990s.

== Founding of the Liberator Memorial Fund ==
In the 1980s former RAAF Liberator radio operator Eric Clark suggested to his former pilot Bob Butler that a national Liberator memorial be created. In 1988 a two-day meeting was held at RAAF Base Wagga by the "B-24 Squadrons of Australia" discussing the idea and the idea of acquiring a Liberator for public display was made. A decision was made to form the "B-24 Liberator Memorial Fund Incorporated", was formally incorporated in December 1989 as a non-profit organisation. The word "restoration" was added in 1997.

== Museum ==
In 1993 the group began using an aircraft hangar on the Werribee Satellite Aerodrome. The hangar had been built by the United States Army Air Force during the war. The land had since become part of the Western Treatment Plant owned by Melbourne Water. In 2012 Melbourne Water gave Places Victoria the rights to build public housing on the site, with a school planned to be on the hangar's location. In October 2014 it was announced that an agreement between the Victorian Government, Melbourne Water and the group had signed an agreement where Melbourne Water would transfer 1.475 hectares of land through the government to the group.

In 2018, B-24 Liberator Memorial Australia gained museum accreditation through the Victorian branch of the Australian Museums and Galleries Association.

=== Restoration ===
The restoration of the aircraft has been ongoing since 1995. As of 2015 work on refurbishing the airframe was almost complete, and work was being done on the nacelle cowling panels and electrical work was ongoing. Eventually, the B-24 Liberator will be moved into the newly relocated and refurbished Hangar 1, with works to be completed in late 2026 or early 2027.

=== Other projects ===
An Airspeed Oxford trainer is also under restoration at the hangar in Werribee. It was imported from New Zealand.

CAC Boomerang fighter A46-147 under restoration by its owner Nick Knight was moved to the Liberator hangar in 2015 after he ran out of space in his garage.
