= Peter Cundy =

Royal Air Force officer

Peter John Cundy
- Born: 3 October 1916; Bognor, West Sussex, England
- Died: 4 August 2005 (aged 88)
- Military career
- Allegiance: United Kingdom
- Branch: British Army; Royal Air Force
- Service years: 1937–1965
- Rank: Wing Commander
- Units: 9th Battalion, Middlesex Regiment; No. 53 Squadron RAF; No. 120 Squadron RAF; No. 224 Squadron RAF
- Commands: No. 210 Squadron RAF
- Conflicts: World War II • Battle of the Atlantic
- Awards: Distinguished Service Order; Distinguished Flying Cross; Air Force Cross; Efficiency Decoration

Peter John Cundy DSO, DFC, AFC, TD (3 October 1916 – 4 August 2005) was a British military aviator who fought during the Second World War. While serving under the RAF Coastal Command he was involved in new techniques for locating and destroying enemy submarines.

== Early life and family ==
Cundy was born at Bognor, the elder of twin sons born to Wright Cundy, a brewer, and his wife Emma Louise, and was educated at Eastbourne College. His younger brother Robert Michael Cundy followed him into the army, and then the RAF, serving as a flying officer in No. 13 Squadron RAF, until his Blenheim light bomber was reported missing on a night operation in May 1942. Robert's body was later recovered and is buried in Boulogne Eastern Cemetery.

== Military service ==
After serving as a cadet in the Eastbourne College Contingent, Junior Division, Officers' Training Corps, Cundy was commissioned as a second lieutenant in the 9th Battalion, Middlesex Regiment, part of the Territorial Army, on 14 July 1937.

On 11 April 1940 Cundy was attached to the Royal Air Force, being granted a temporary commission as a pilot officer. After completing flight training he joined No. 53 Squadron, to fly Bristol Blenheims with Coastal Command, attacking U-boat bases along the French Atlantic coast. He was promoted to the war substantive rank of flying officer on 11 April 1941.

In 1941 Cundy joined No. 120 Squadron, flying a new long-range American-built B-24 Liberator. On 11 January 1942 while on patrol over the Bay of Biscay, he saw a Heinkel He 115 twin-engined floatplane, and manoeuvred his aircraft so his gunners could bring their fire to bear. The seaplane escaped into cloud with an engine on fire. Soon afterwards Cundy sighted the U-373 refuelling alongside a large tanker. Cundy immediately attacked both vessels with depth charges and machine gun fire. The submarine was damaged but dived, leaving a large patch of surface oil. Cundy was then attacked by another enemy He 115, but the Liberator's gunners drove it away damaged before Cundy resumed his attack on the tanker. Cundy and his navigator, Pilot Officer Ronald Roxburgh Fabel, were both subsequently awarded the Distinguished Flying Cross.

Cundy was promoted to the war substantive rank of flight lieutenant on 11 April 1942, and in May he and his crew were detached to America to assist in the development of a new air-to-surface radar. They then joined No. 224 Squadron in October 1942, flying the maritime version of the B-24 Liberator from St Eval in Cornwall on patrols in over the Bay of Biscay.

=== U-boat encounters ===
On 26 February 1943 Cundy was on patrol when he spotted U-437 on the surface. The U-boat crash-dived as Cundy dropped depth charges without any visible effect. The Liberator continued its patrol and shortly afterwards saw a second submarine, U-508, which was attacked with the remaining depth charges. They saw the U-boat's bows appear almost vertically, and sink below the surface, so were rather surprised to see her surface and sail away some time later. However, U-508 had been damaged and was forced to return to Lorient.

On patrol on 3 July 1943, Cundy sighted a U-boat on the surface several miles ahead. With his gunners opening fire with machine guns, he dived to attack and launched the Hedgehog anti-submarine weapon onto the submarine, U-628, which had recently left Brest on its fourth cruise. He made a second attack despite his aircraft suffering serious damage from return fire. Cundy then dropped four depth charges which straddled the submarine. Cundy made a further attack as the submarine settled low in the water. As he circled after his third attack, it was seen that the U-boat had sunk and crewmen were in the water. Cundy nursed his aircraft back to St Eval on three engines; there was also damage to the fuel tanks and the aircraft's tail, but he made a safe landing. This was the first use of the Hedgehog anti-submarine weapon from an aircraft.

On 23 July 1943 Cundy was awarded the Distinguished Service Order. His citation read:

"Since being awarded the Distinguished Flying Cross this officer has been almost continuously engaged on operations. In February 1943, during an anti-submarine patrol, he executed two attacks on U-boats. During a flight in July 1943, Squadron Leader Cundy sighted a U-boat. In spite of heavy opposing fire from the vessel, which damaged his aircraft and disabled one engine; he pressed home two vigorous attacks, straddling the U-boat with his depth charges. Afterwards a large patch of oil appeared on the surface of the water. Squadron Leader Cundy is a skilful pilot whose leadership, courage and determination have been outstanding.

=== Command HQ service ===
In November 1943, after three years of constant operations, Cundy was transferred to Coastal Command HQ on staff and planning duties. During this period he also flew tests evaluating the Leigh light, a powerful searchlight carried on the wing of an anti-submarine aircraft. He was promoted to squadron leader (war substantive) on 8 May 1944. For his work, on 14 June 1945, and by then an acting wing commander, he was awarded the Air Force Cross.

Throughout the war Cundy had served on attachment to the RAF, but on 1 September 1945 he finally relinquished his Territorial Army commission as a second lieutenant, accepting a permanent commission in the RAF, with the rank of squadron leader.

Cundy then flew Dakota transport aircraft before becoming an instructor, serving for three years with the Air Training Wing in Rhodesia, then with No. 236 Operational Conversion Unit, equipped with the Avro Lancaster. In May 1951 he assumed command of No. 210 Squadron, operating the Lancaster in the maritime reconnaissance role from Ballykelly in Northern Ireland.

He was promoted to wing commander on 1 January 1952, and eventually retired from the RAF on 3 October 1963.

== Post-military career ==
Cundy worked as a personnel manager for a market research company before taking up property management. In 1995 he was met the surviving crew members of U-373, who had escaped his attack in January 1942, when he was invited to Bavaria as guest of honour at their annual reunion, where he met the II WO, Joachim Jaworski. He attended every reunion for the next ten years.

Cundy retired to East Anglia, where he enjoyed fishing and shooting. Cundy died on 4 August 2005. He had married Section Officer Sheila Frost, WAAF, in 1945. She died six days before her husband, and they were survived by three sons and a daughter.
