= Mount Crosson =

Mountain in Alaska, United States

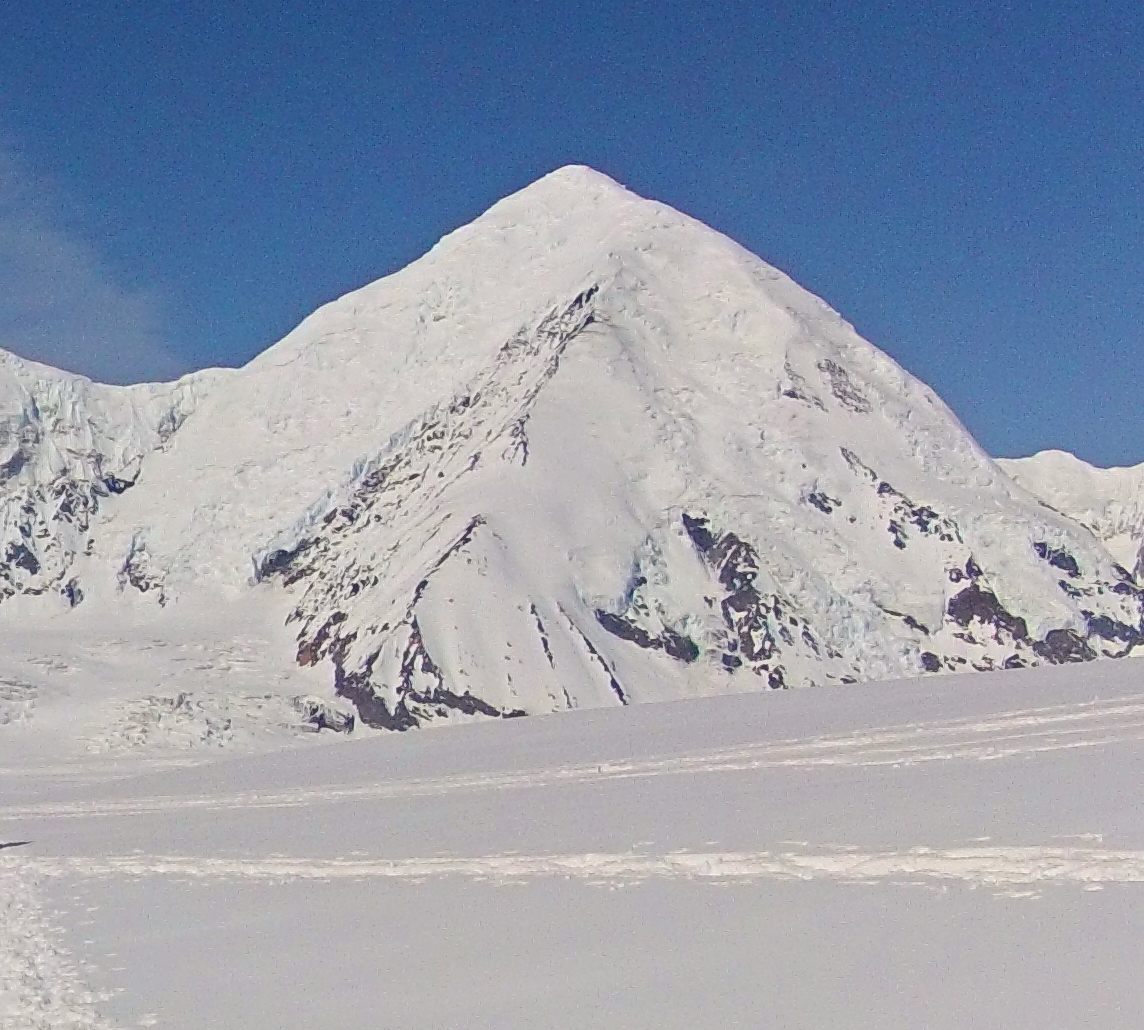

Highest point
- Elevation: 12,352 ft (3,765 m)
- Prominence: 1,600 ft (490 m)
- Coordinates: 63°00′30″N 151°16′21″W

Geography
- Location within Alaska
- Location: Denali Borough, Alaska, United States
- Parent range: Alaska Range
- Topo map: USGS Mount McKinley A-3

Climbing
- Easiest route: Southeast ridge

Mount Crosson is a 12,352-foot (3,765 m) mountain in the Alaska Range, in Denali National Park and Preserve. Mount Crosson lies to the northeast of Mount Foraker, overlooking Kahiltna Glacier. The mountain was named in 1949 by mountaineer Bradford Washburn for bush pilot Joe Crosson.

== See also ==
- Mountain peaks of Alaska
- Marvel Crosson
