= Royal Victorian Aero Club =

Australian aero club

The Royal Victorian Aero Club is an Australian aero club based at Moorabbin Airport in Melbourne.

== History ==
Founded by pioneer aviators in 1914 at Point Cook, the club is one of Australia's oldest flying training organisations.

The Australian Aero Club was formed on 28 October 1914 (and formally established on 9 April 1915) and was subsequently affiliated with the Royal Aero Club of Great Britain.

Renamed the Victorian Aero Club in October 1934, on 13 March 1935 approval to use the "Royal" prefix was granted and since that date the institution has been known as the Royal Victorian Aero Club.

While originally formed at Point Cook, in 1919 the Club transferred operations to what was then the Commonwealth Aerodrome on Bulla Road in Essendon.

The Flying Section of the Club was officially opened by Lieutenant Governor Sir William Irvine on 21 August 1926.

Operations were somewhat limited during the Second World War, and Essendon Airport subsequently became the primary commercial airport for Melbourne, with increased airline traffic limiting private operations.

== Identities ==
Laurie McPherson, Instructor 1950–1951. CFI 1952–1960, 1969–1970 and Manager 1961–1968 and 1978–1985. Pilot who conducted tests on behalf of the Australian Department of Civil Aviation to closely examine the spinning characteristics of the DHC Chipmunk.

Roy F Goon, first flew with RVAC in 1933, flew CAC Boomerang aircraft during the Second World War in Darwin and Gove (Sqdn. Ldr. 83 Sqdn). Commanding Officer of l l l MFCU at Labuan. He held this position from 14 February 1943 to 7 September 1945 and was a test pilot with the RAAF, Commonwealth Aircraft Factory and Royal Flying Doctor Service. Held Commercial Pilot Licence No. 511 and was an instructor at the RVAC for 40 years and Chief Flying Instructor in 1977. Goon was a member of the well-known Chinese-Australian family from Ballarat, Victoria.

Sir Thomas Walter White, KBE, DFC, VD, MP, first Secretary of the Club, and one of the first airmen trained for the Australian Flying Corp. He went on to become Member for Balaclava in the House of Representatives (1929-1938) resigning to join the RAAF at the outbreak of World War II. He rejoined the House of Representatives in 1945, later becoming the Minister of Air and Minister of Civil Aviation (1949-1951). He resigned from Parliament in 1951 and become Australia's High Commissioner to the United Kingdom (1951-1956). During this time he was knighted.

== Club Operations ==
The Royal Victorian Aero Club provides aircraft and facilities for pilot training and private flying at Moorabbin Airport.

== Aircraft ==
=== Previous aircraft ===
Most of the training aircraft in the 1950s were the de Havilland Tiger Moth.

The De Havilland Canada DHC-1 Chipmunk and Victa Airtourer were used in the 1960s followed subsequently by a limited number of Beechcraft.

=== Current fleet ===
- Piper Warrior (x7)
- Piper Archer (x2)
- Piper Arrow (x2)
- Cessna 152 (x2)
- Cessna 172 (x2)
- Piper Seminole (x2)
- Partenavia (x1)

== See also ==
- RAAF Centenary Air Armada
