= Little Eva (aircraft) =

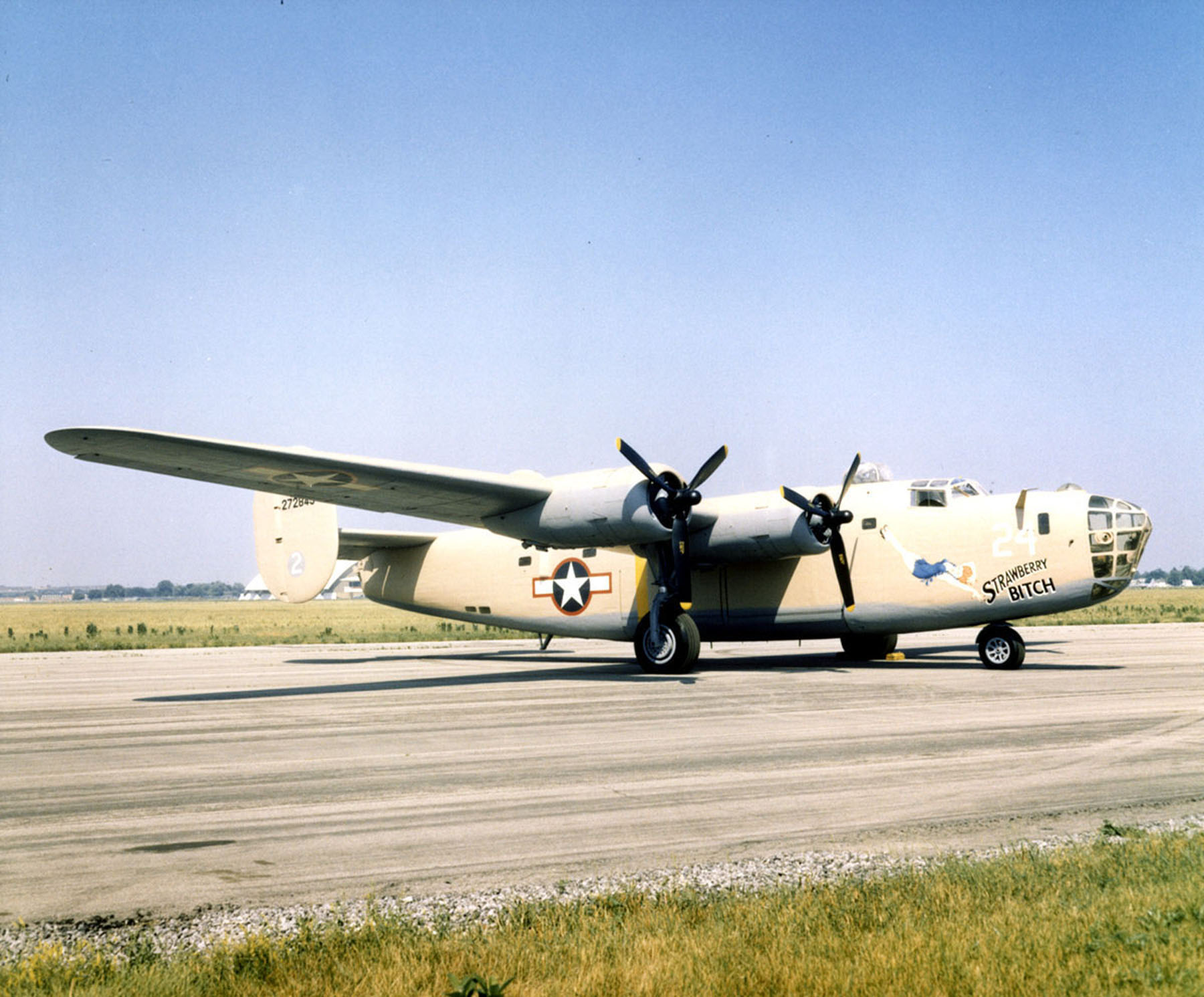
- Consolidated B-24D Liberator similar to "Little Eva"

incident
- Date: 2 December 1942
- Summary: fuel exhaustion
- Site: Near the Gulf of Carpentaria Queensland, Australia; 17°20′1″S 139°00′3″E

Aircraft
- Aircraft type: Consolidated B-24 Liberator
- Flight origin: Military base in Kutini-Payamu National Park
- Destination: Military base in Kutini-Payamu National Park, Queensland, Australia
- Crew: 10
- Fatalities: 7 (two initially, five died before rescue)
- Survivors: 3 (initially 8)

"Little Eva" was a USAAF Consolidated B-24 Liberator which crashed north-west of Burketown, Queensland (near the Gulf of Carpentaria) on 2 December 1942. The aircraft was returning from a bombing mission when its crew became lost. As the fuel supply approached exhaustion some of the crew took to their parachutes. The survivors, now in two groups, set out on foot. Two of the crew travelled east and came across people after twelve days. The other party comprising six survivors travelled west, with the only surviving member being found some five months later.

== Crash ==
The aircraft, part of the 321st Squadron, 90th Bombardment Group based at Iron Range was returning with four other B-24s from a bombing raid on a Japanese troop convoy about 80 km north of Buna, Papua New Guinea. "Little Eva" lost touch with the other aircraft and returned to the base on its own. A severe thunderstorm disabled the radio, causing the flight to lose its way and run out of fuel. Lieutenant Norman Crosson, the pilot, gave orders to bail out. Most of the crew members parachuted to safety, however one was killed when his parachute snagged on the aircraft and another who did not jump was killed when the plane crashed at about 2:45am near the Burriejella waterhole.

== Survival ==
Although the crew had been instructed to meet at the crash site, only Crosson and Sergeant Loy Wilson arrived there. The other survivors had decided to head for the coast about 24 km (15 mi) away. Both groups of survivors believed they were on the east coast of Cape York Peninsula and close to Cairns.

Crosson and Wilson had extremely little food and water. They walked east to what they felt should be the east coast of Cape York and quite by chance this route took them almost straight to Escott Station, 15 km west of Burketown, where they arrived on 14 December 1942 after a trek of some 60 km. Exhausted and with badly blistered feet, they were driven to the four-bed Burketown hospital for medical attention and flown back to Iron Range a week later. Their rescue sparked a search for the other men which would continue for some five months. The missing men were Staff Sergeant Grady Gaston, 2nd Lieutenant Arthur Speltz, 2nd Lieutenant Dale Grimes, 2nd Lieutenant John Dyer, and two other unaccounted crew members. Their resources consisted of two .45 calibre pistols, a few bars of chocolate, a jungle knife, a fish hook and line, and some matches.

After the crash Gaston's party travelled in a westerly direction until they reached the Gulf of Carpentaria and then followed the shoreline. They were fortunate enough to shoot a young bullock on their fourth day out, gorged themselves on as much meat as they could and pressed on. Concerned about carrying unnecessary weight, they took no meat with them. A day later they discarded their pistols as being rusty and useless. Heading north-west along the beach, they were forced to swim across a number of rivers—managing to avoid the crocodiles common in those waters.

== Search and rescue ==
On 15 December 1942 a large search party consisting of seven men of the North Australia Observer Unit (NAOU), fifteen Volunteer Defence Corps (VDC) members, a local policeman and two Aboriginal trackers set out from Escott Station to find the crash site.

The officer heading the search was Lieutenant Stan Chapman of the NAOU and he made his headquarters at Burketown. Five days into the search he enlisted the help of Ian Hosie, a Flying Doctor and soon located the wreckage. Here they found six parachutes and two charred corpses which they buried at the site. Lieutenant Frank Comans of the NAOU set out with a small party to follow the tracks of the survivors. This they managed to do for more than 130 km. The wet conditions made for difficult tracking particularly at stream crossings and the trail was finally lost at Settlement Creek near the border between Queensland and Northern Territory.

The survivors found a shack on 24 December where they made a base. Grimes, the bombardier, was drowned in Robinson River when the current took him out to sea and he was too weak to swim back. His body was later recovered. Lt Dyer died on 10 February and Speltz (co-pilot) in the night of 24/25 February. Grady Gaston, the ball turret gunner, was rescued on 23 April 1943 when he was discovered by stockmen looking for stray cattle and taken over time to Cloncurry. From there he was collected by the USAAF on 11 May.

== In culture ==
During the 1950s Yanyuwa people created the 'Aeroplane corroboree' performance, which enacts the story of the aircraft's crash and the subsequent searches. It was composed by a Yanyuwa man involved in the search for survivors, and stopped being performed during the 1990s, in keeping with cultural protocol after his death. It was revived in 2001.

In 1988, Les Hiddins visited the crash location and filmed the wreckage as part of his Bush Tucker Man show (series 1, episode 7).

In 1994, Film Australia produced a one-hour documentary about the crash called Aeroplane Dance. It documents the crash and the Yanyuwa Aeroplane corroboree.

Garawa artist Jacky Green's 2013 painting Moonlight depicts the 'Little Eva' story.

An episode of Ultimate Survival WWII that aired November 4, 2019, retraced the path taken by the 4-man group of survivors. Presenter Hazen Audel attempted the outback escape with the same sparse equipment.

A feature film is being developed by Fact Not Fiction Films on the "Little Eva" story.
